= Alpheus (deity) =

Ancient Greek river god

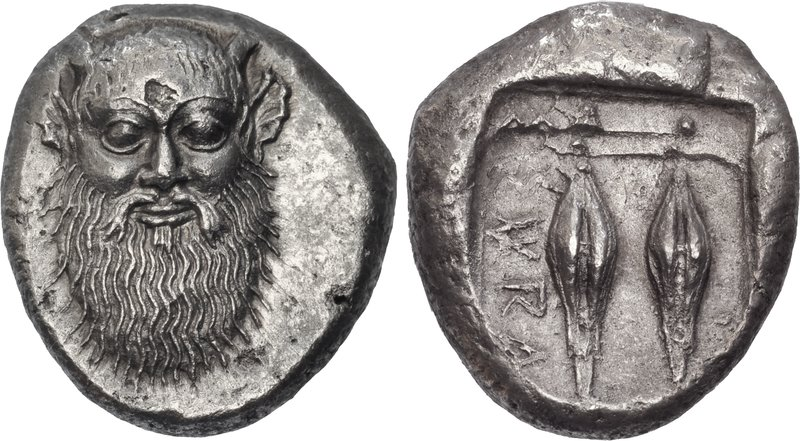
A tetradrachm of Gelon, tyrant of Syracuse, minted c. 485 BC. The obverse depicts Alpheus, referring to the foundation myth of Syracuse.

In Greek mythology, Alpheus or Alpheios (/ælˈfiːəs/; Ancient Greek: Ἀλφειός, lit. 'whitish') was the river god who embodied the river of the same name.

== Family ==
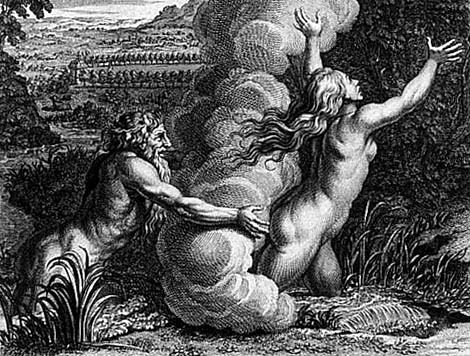
An engraving by Bernard Picart depicting a scene from Ovid's Metamorphoses in which Alpheus attempts to capture the nymph Arethusa.

Like most river gods, Alpheus was the child of the Titans Oceanus and his sister-wife Tethys. Telegone, daughter of Pharis, bore Alpheus' son, the king Orsilochus. Through Orsilochus, Alpheus became the grandfather of Diocles, and great-grandfather of a pair of soldiers, Crethon and Orsilochus, who were slain by Aeneas during the Trojan War. Alpheus was also called the father of Melantheia who became the mother of Eirene by Poseidon. In later accounts, Alpheus (Alphionis) was the father of Phoenissa, possible mother of Endymion by Zeus.

== Mythology ==
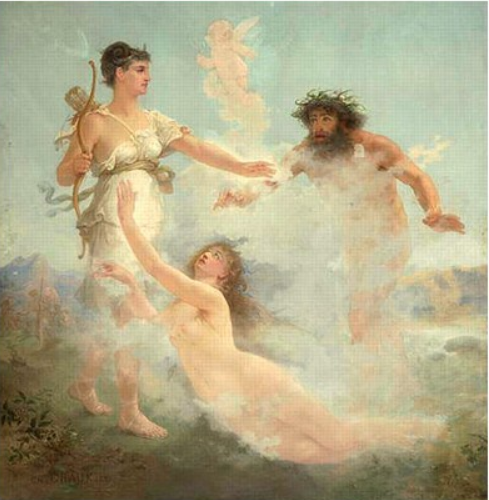
La Ninfa Aretusa by Alexandre Crauk

According to Pausanias, Alpheus was a passionate hunter and fell in love with the nymph Arethusa, but she fled from him to the island of Ortygia near Syracuse, and metamorphosed herself into a well, after which Alpheus became a river, which flowing from the Peloponnese under the sea to Ortygia, there united its waters with those of the well Arethusa. The well of Arethusa is a symbol of Syracuse. This story is related somewhat differently by the Roman writer Ovid: Arethusa, a beautiful nymph, once while bathing in the river Alpheus in Arcadia, was surprised and pursued by the river god; but the goddess Artemis took pity upon her and changed her into a well, which flowed under the earth to the island of Ortygia. Alpheus took on water form jumping into the stream, but the earth opened and the stream flew underground to appear in a bay near Syracuse, near the island Ortygia, a location sacred to Artemis.

According to other traditions, Artemis herself was the object of the love of Alpheus. Once, it is said, when pursued by him she fled to Letrini in Elis, and here she covered her face and those of her companions (nymphs) with mud, so that Alpheus could not discover or distinguish her, and was obliged to return. This occasioned the building of a temple of Artemis Alphaea at Letrini. According to another version, the goddess fled to Ortygia, where she had likewise a temple under the name of Alphaea. An allusion to Alpheius' love of Artemis is also contained in the fact that at Olympia the two divinities had one altar in common.

In these accounts two or more distinct stories seem to be mixed up together, but they probably originated in the popular belief that there was a natural subterranean communication between the river Alpheios and the well Arethusa. It was believed that a cup thrown into the Alpheus would make its reappearance in the well Arethusa in Ortygia. Plutarch gives an account which is altogether unconnected with those mentioned above. According to him, Alpheus was a son of Helios, and killed his brother Cercaphus in a contest. Haunted by despair and the Erinyes he leapt into the river Nyctimus which afterwards received the name Alpheus.

Alpheus was also the river which Heracles, in the fifth of his labours, rerouted in order to clean the filth from the Augean Stables in a single day, a task which had been presumed to be impossible.

== Roman references ==
Alpheus is often associated with Antinous, the lover of the Roman Emperor Hadrian. Antinous was a Greek youth who had drowned in the Nile River. After he was deified, coins of the period depict him as Alpheios or Hadrian with Alpheios.

== Gallery ==
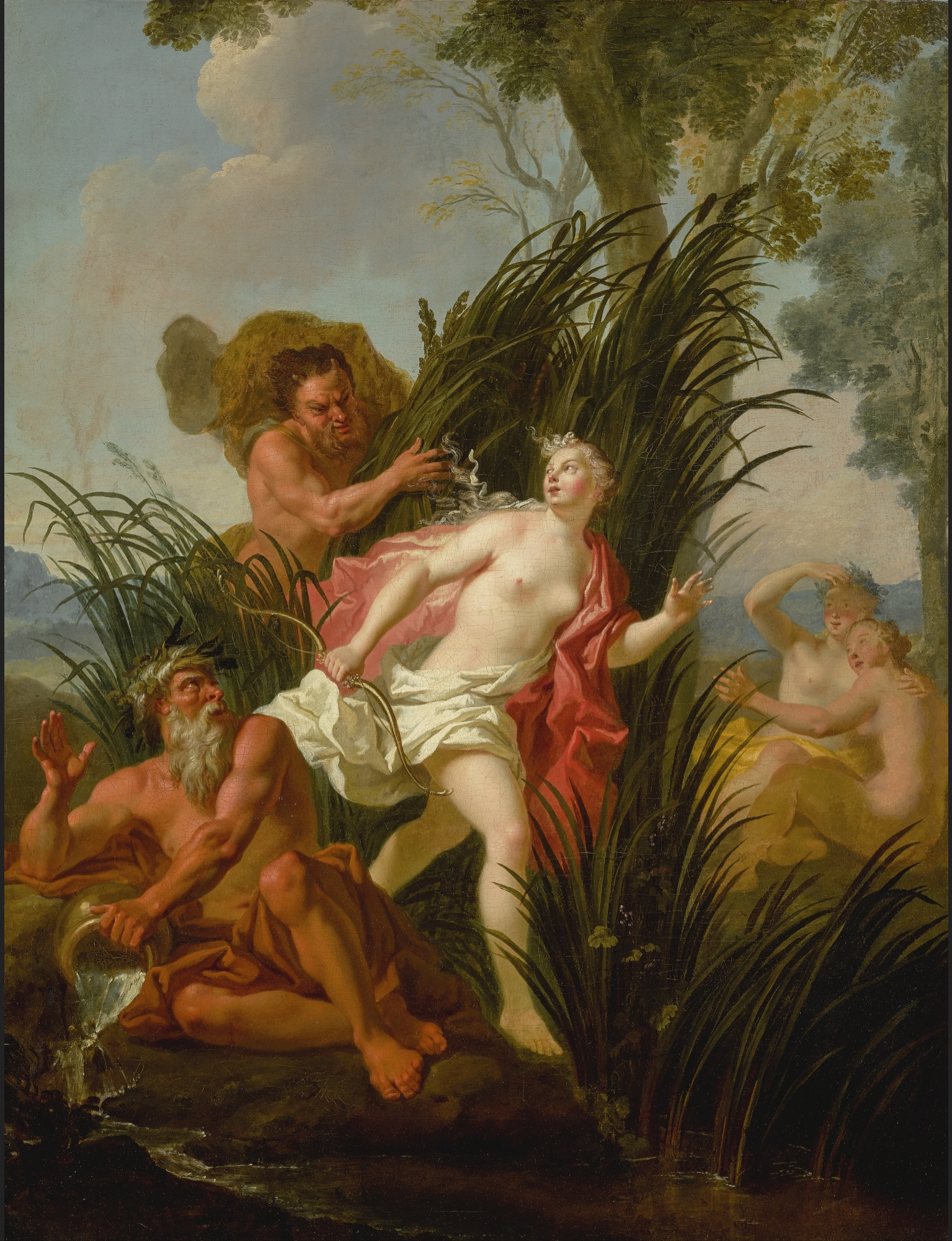
Alpheus chasing Arethusa by Antoine Coypel (18th-century)

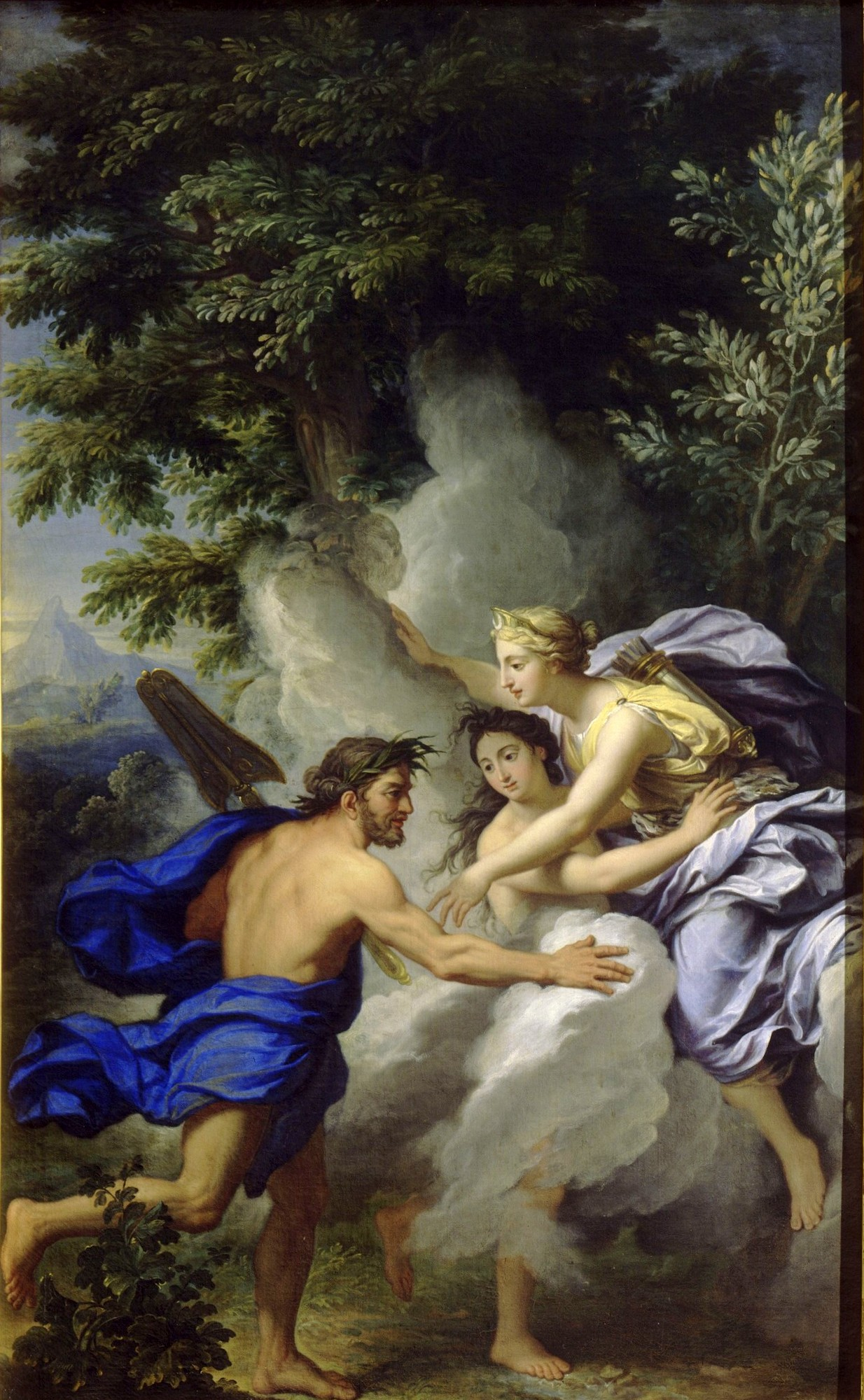
Alpheus and Arethusa by René-Antoine Houasse

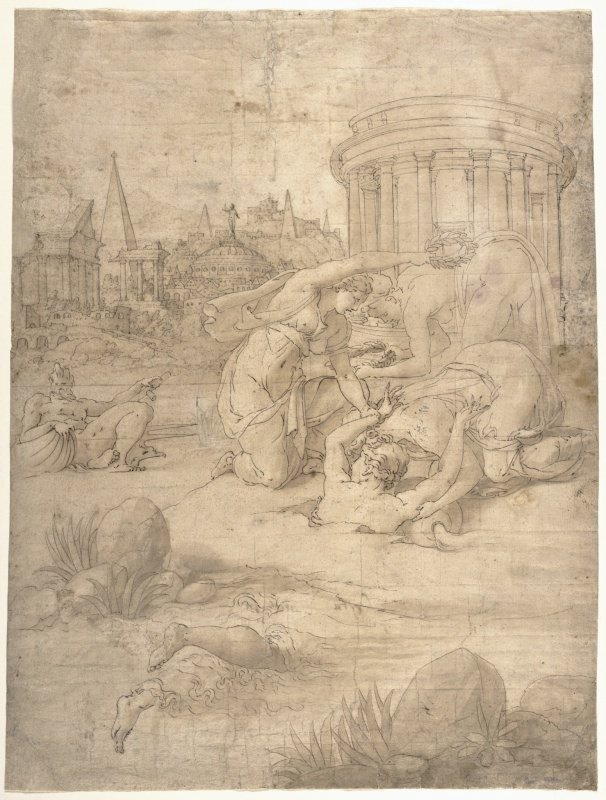
The Story of Arethusa by Francesco Primaticcio

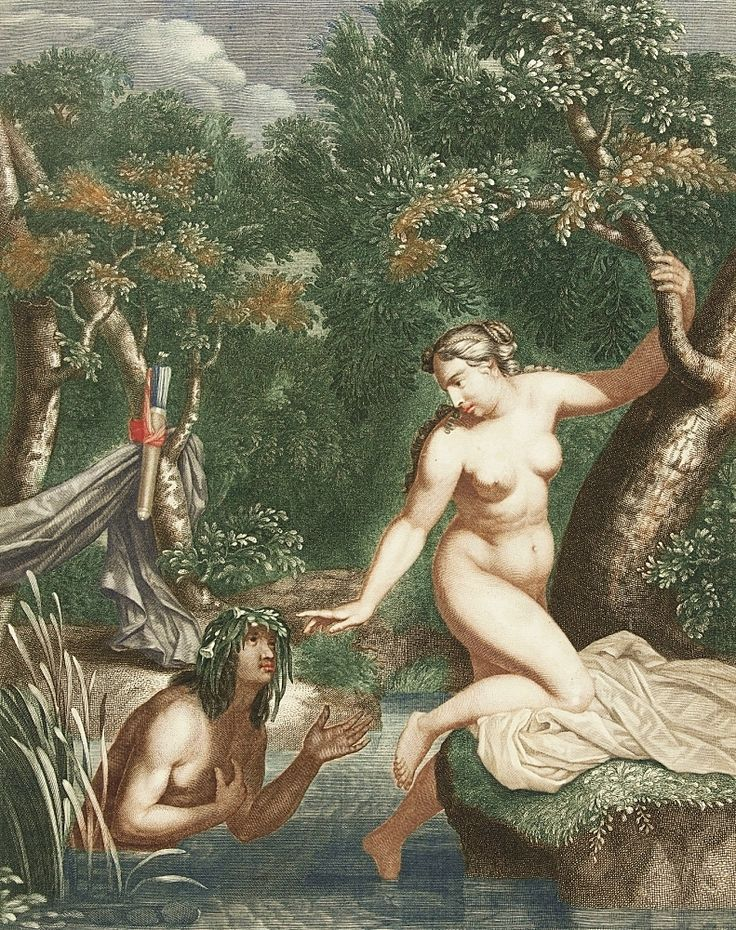
Alpheus and Arethusa by Abraham Bloteling (between 1655 and 1690)

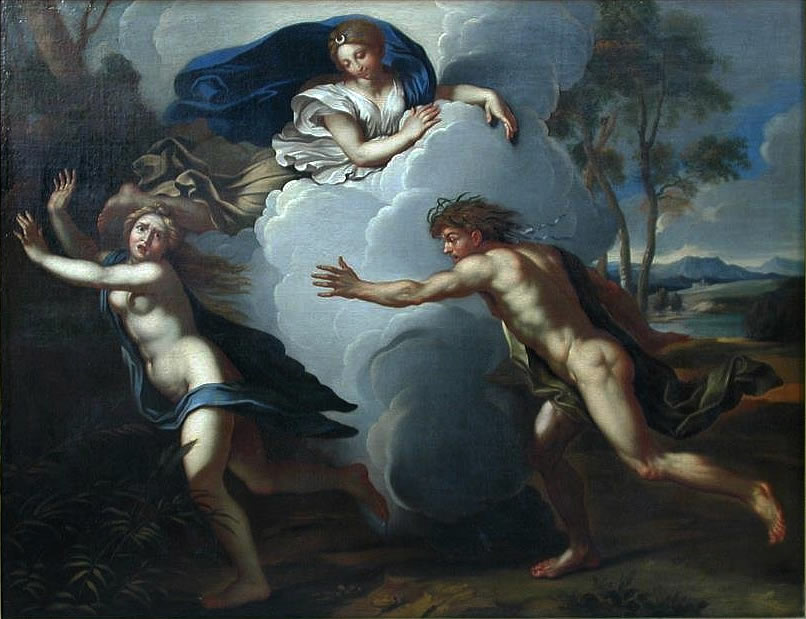
Alpheus and Arethusa (Roman School, circa 1640)

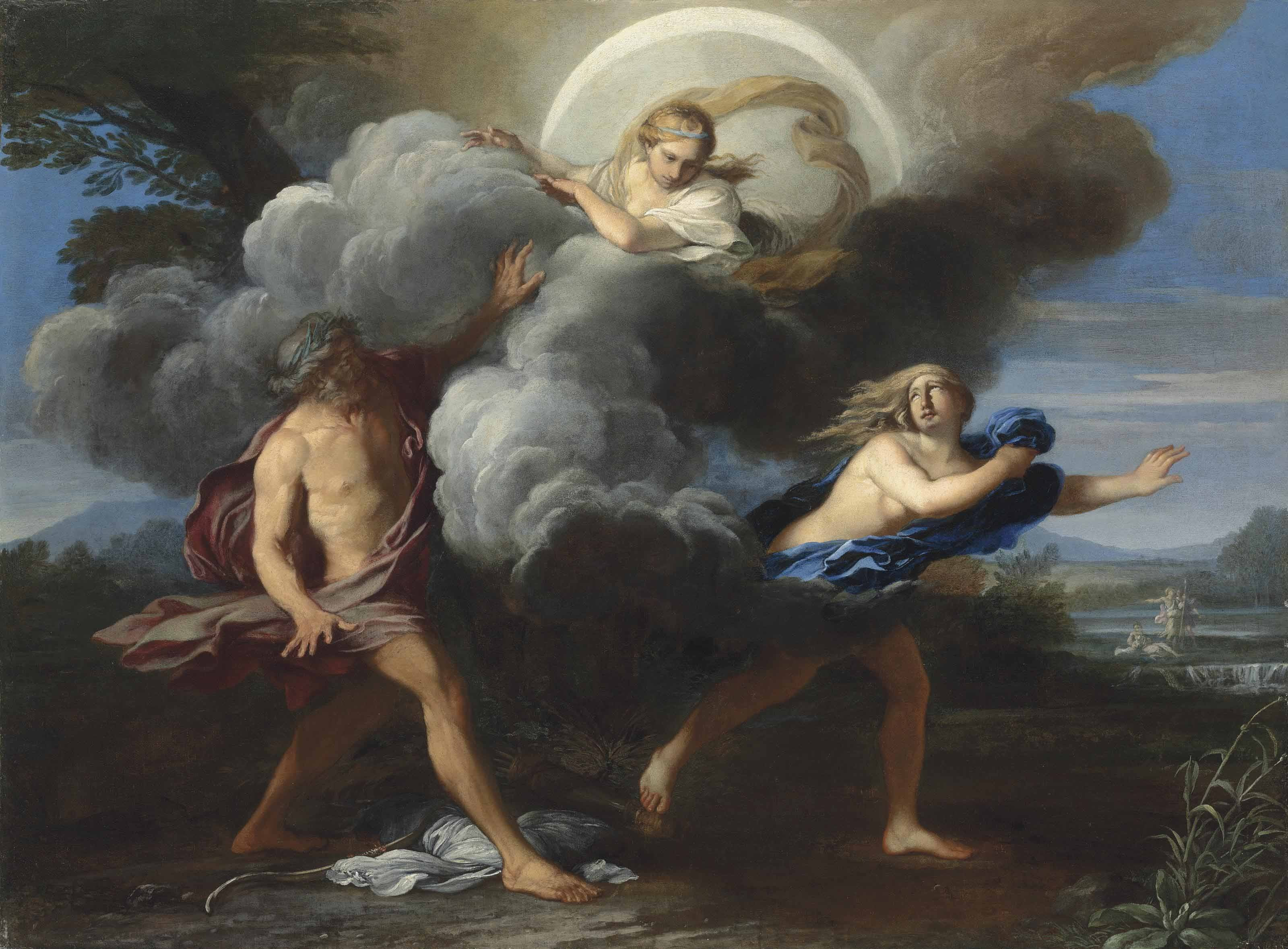
Alpheus and Arethusa by Carlo Maratta (7th-century)

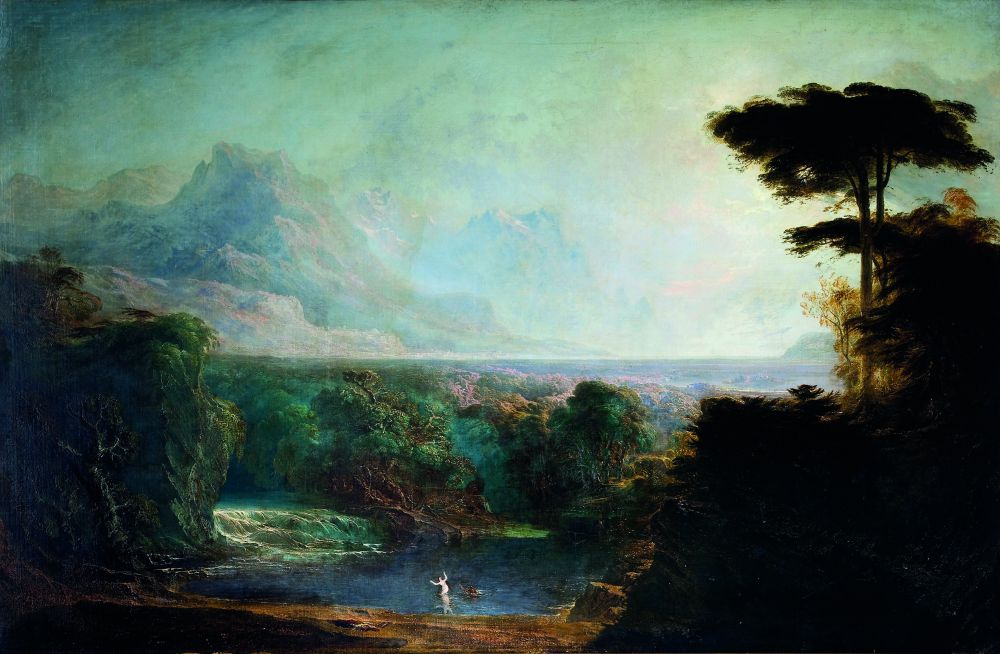
Alpheus and Arethusa by John Martin (1832)

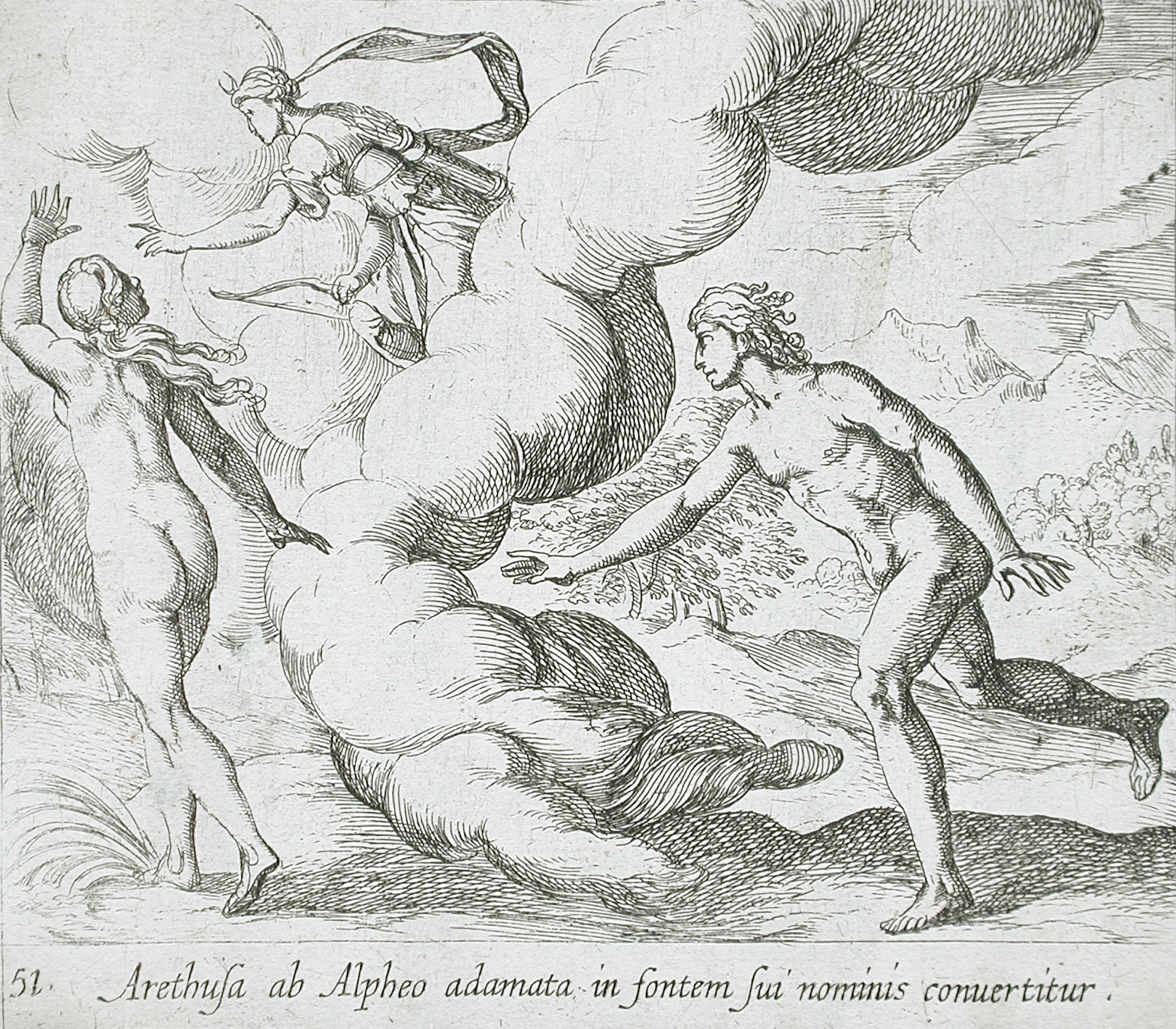
Arethusa Chased by Alpheus by Wilhelm Janson and Antonio Tempesta (1606)

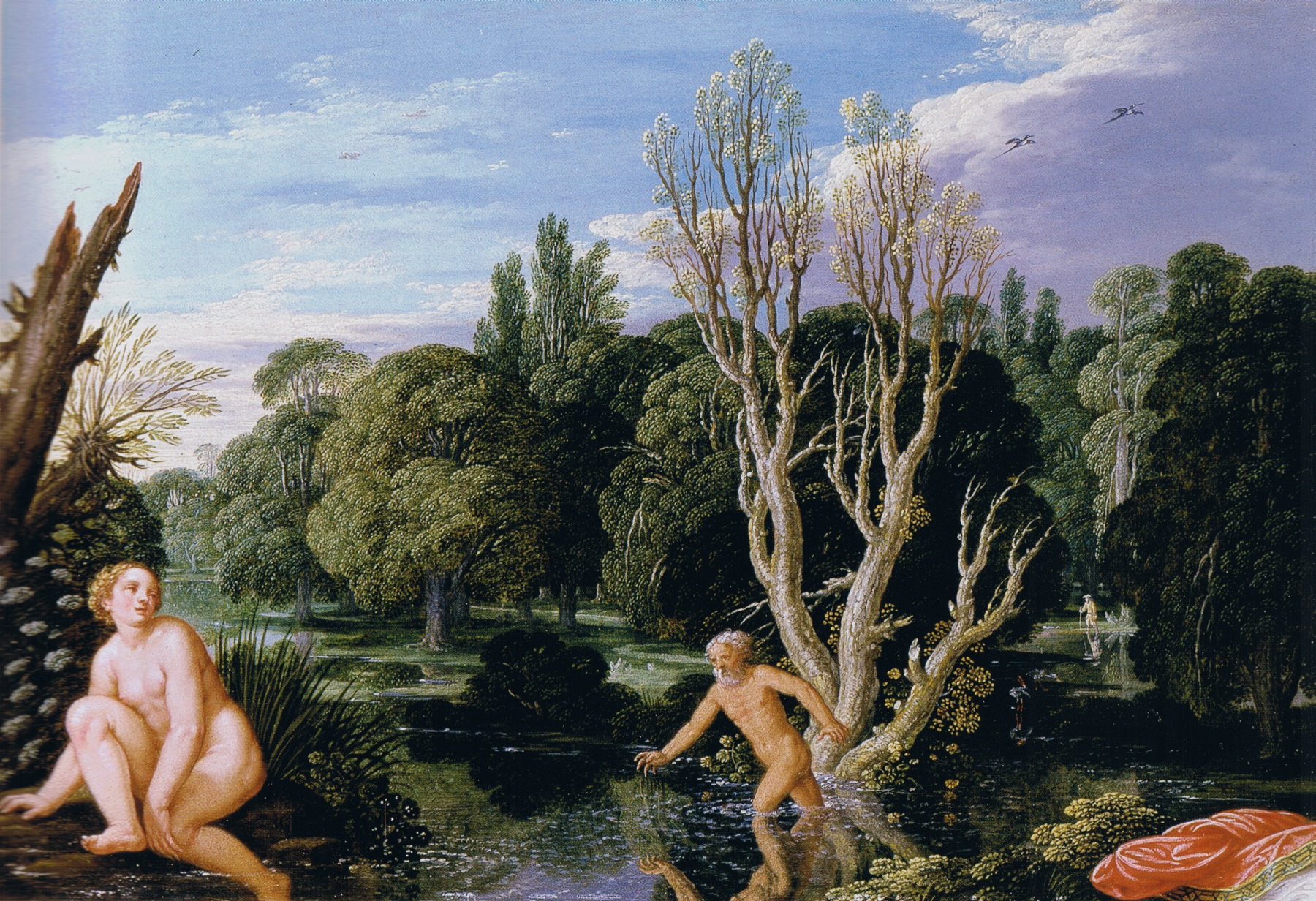
Alpheus and Arethusa by Johann König (probably 1610s)

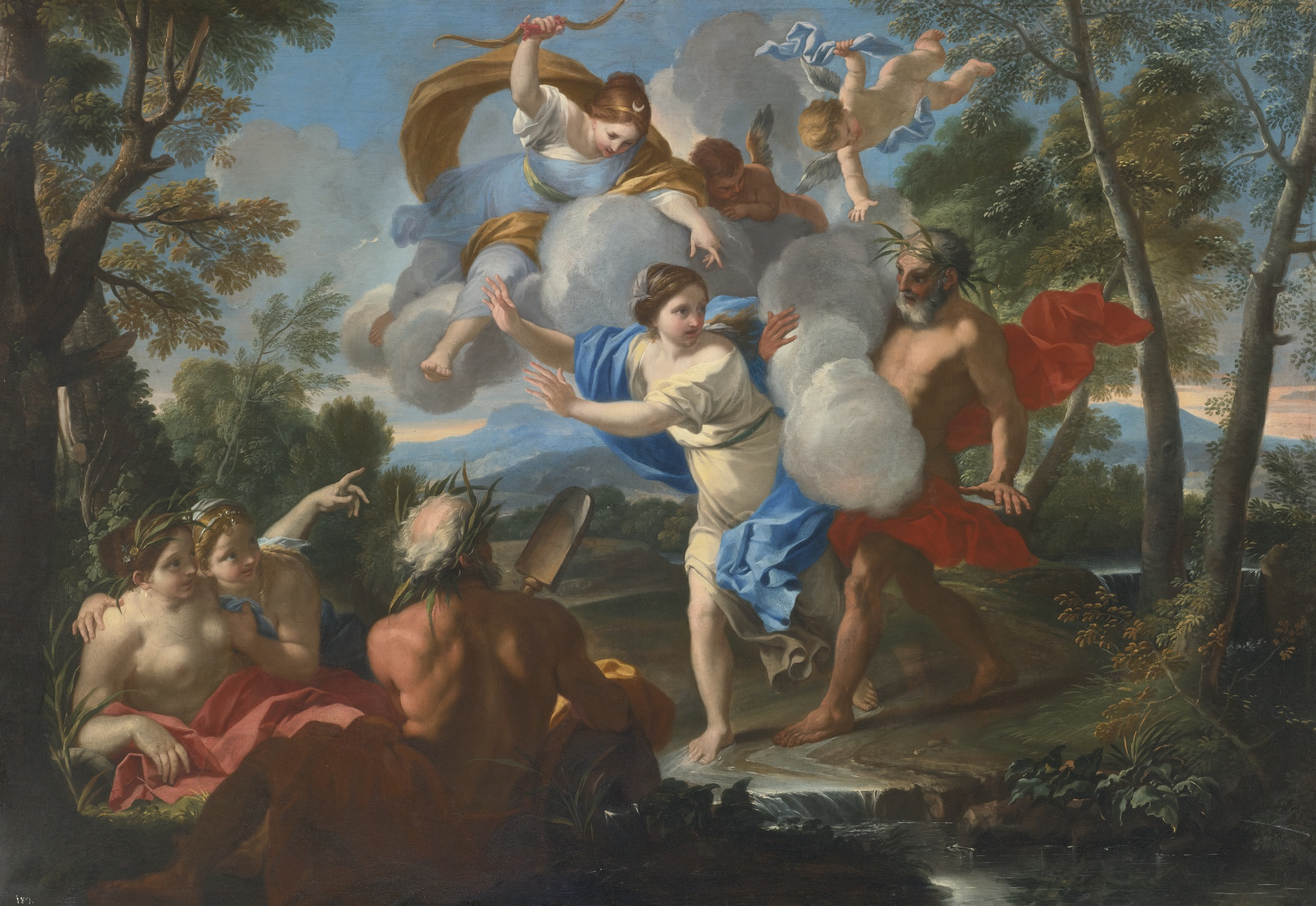
Alpheus and Arethusa by Luigi Garzi

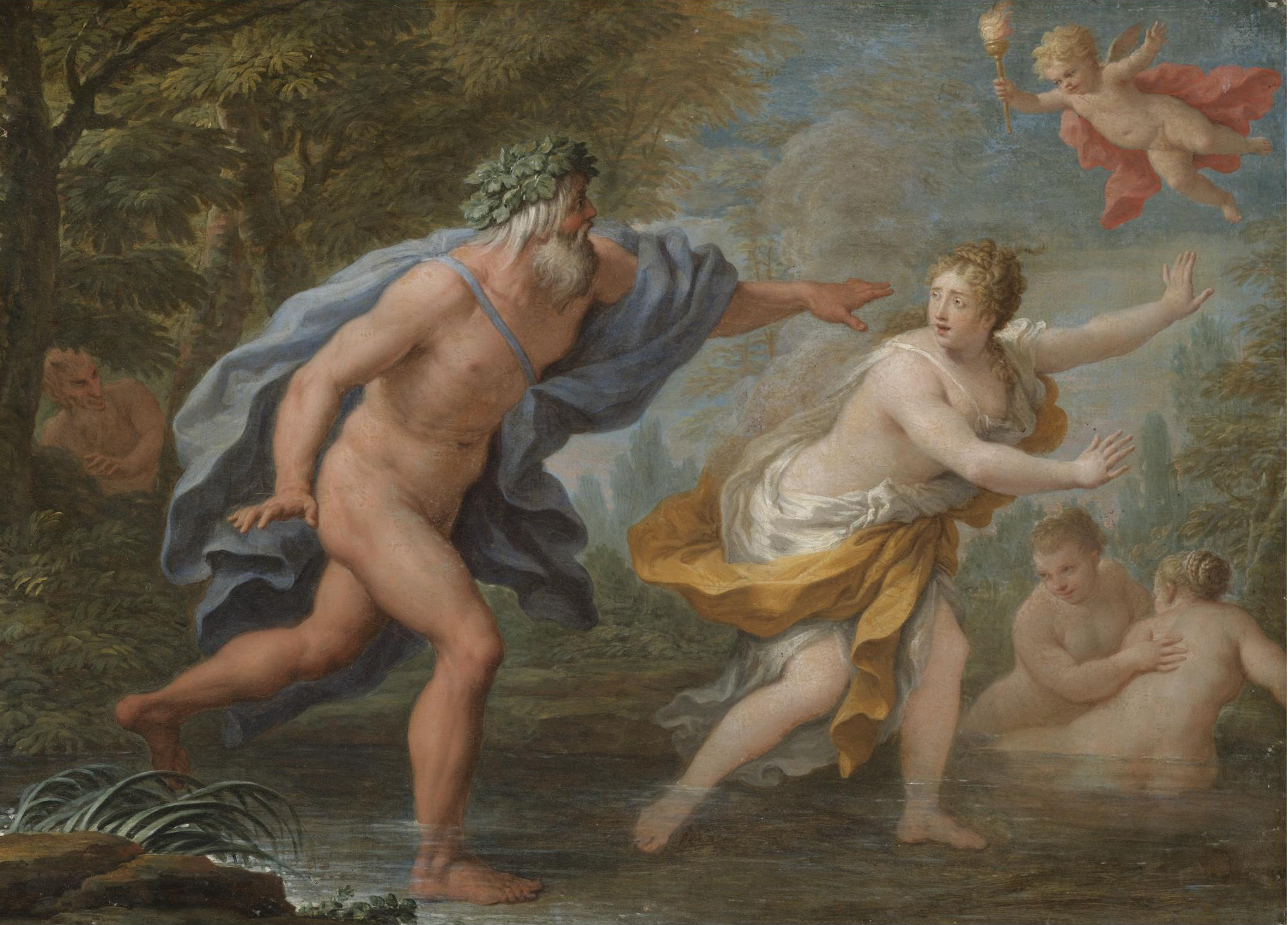
Alpheus and Arethusa by Paolo de Matteis (1710)

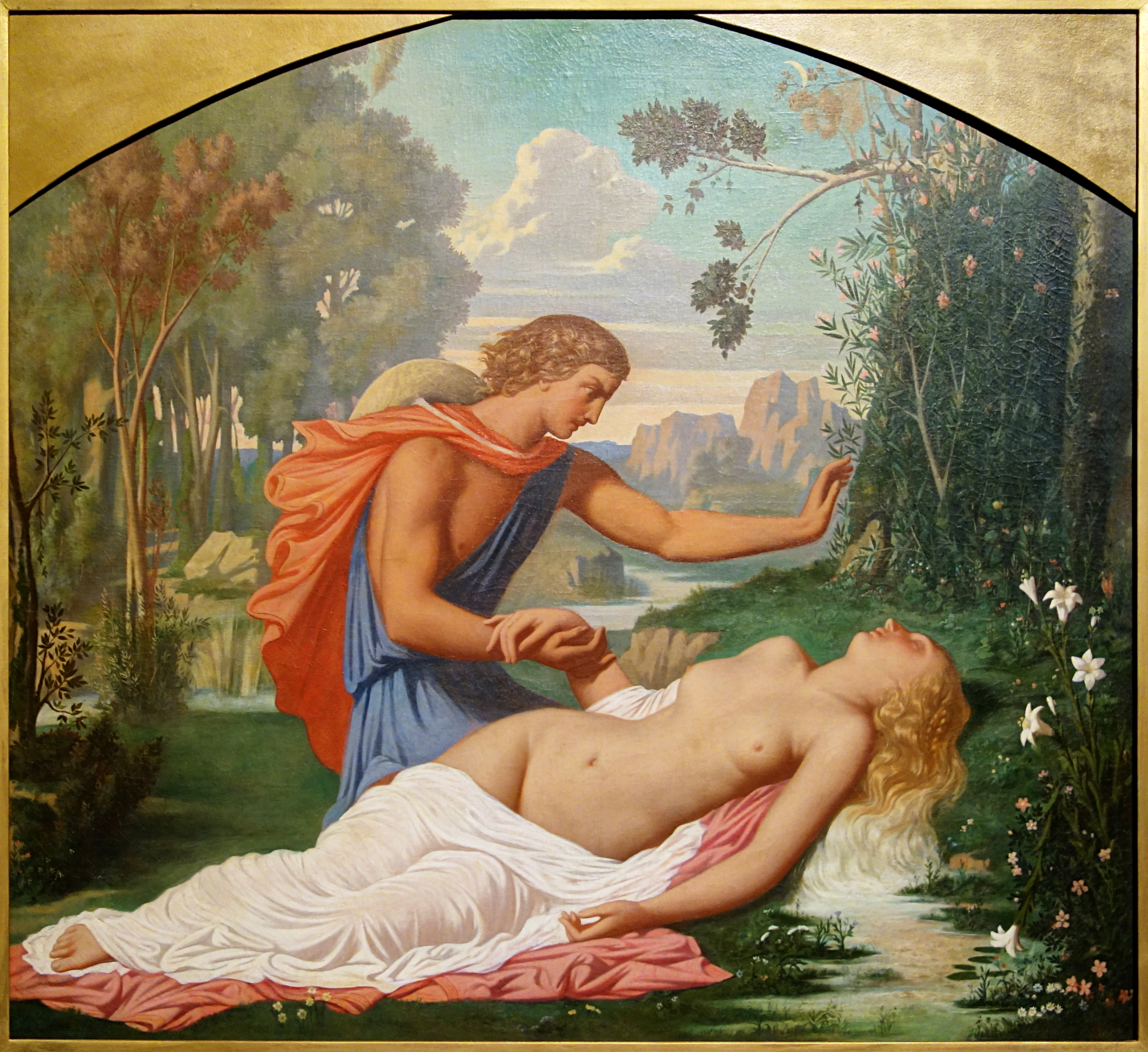
Aréthuse et Alphée by Léopold Burthe (1847)

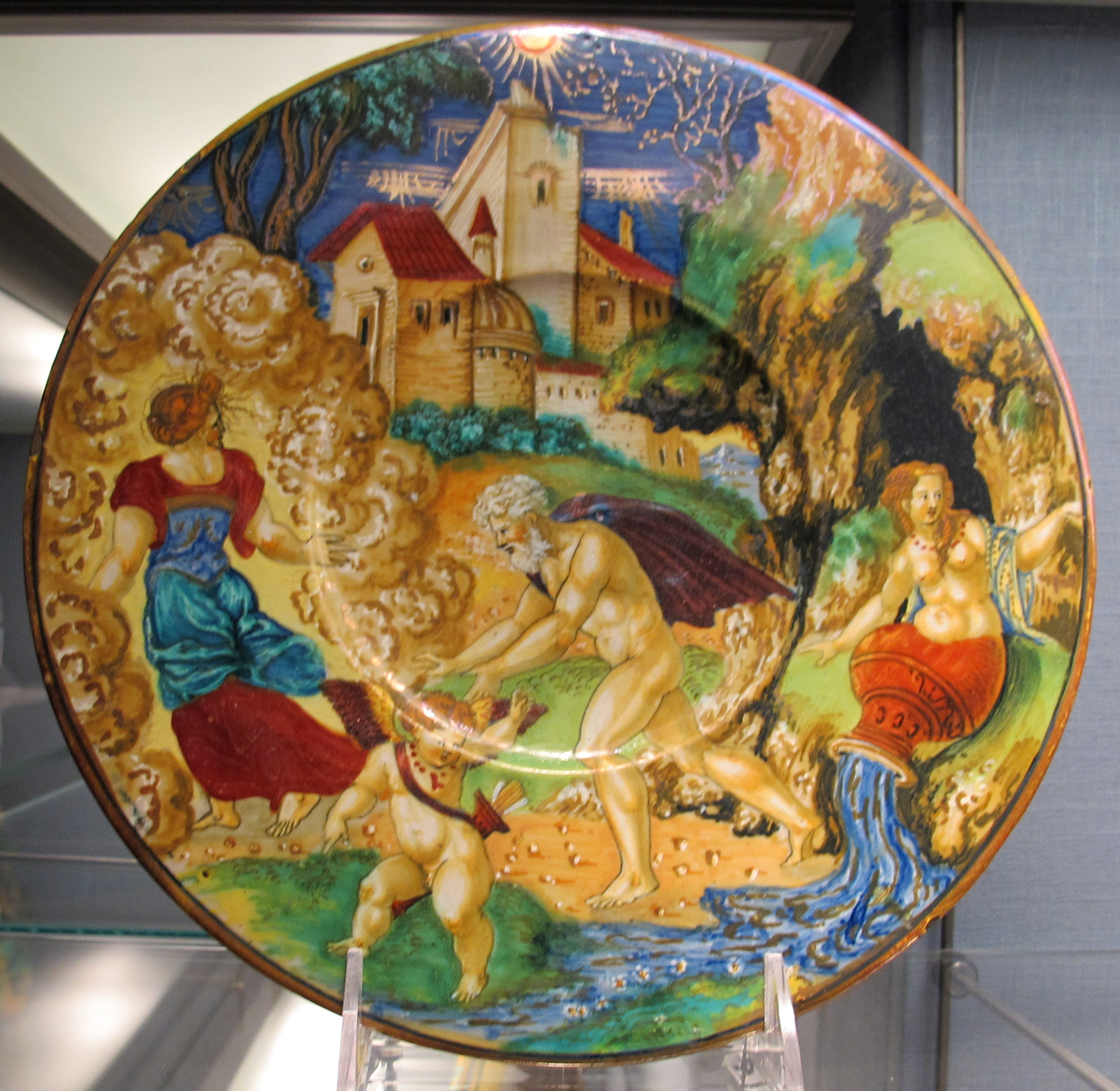
Arethusa

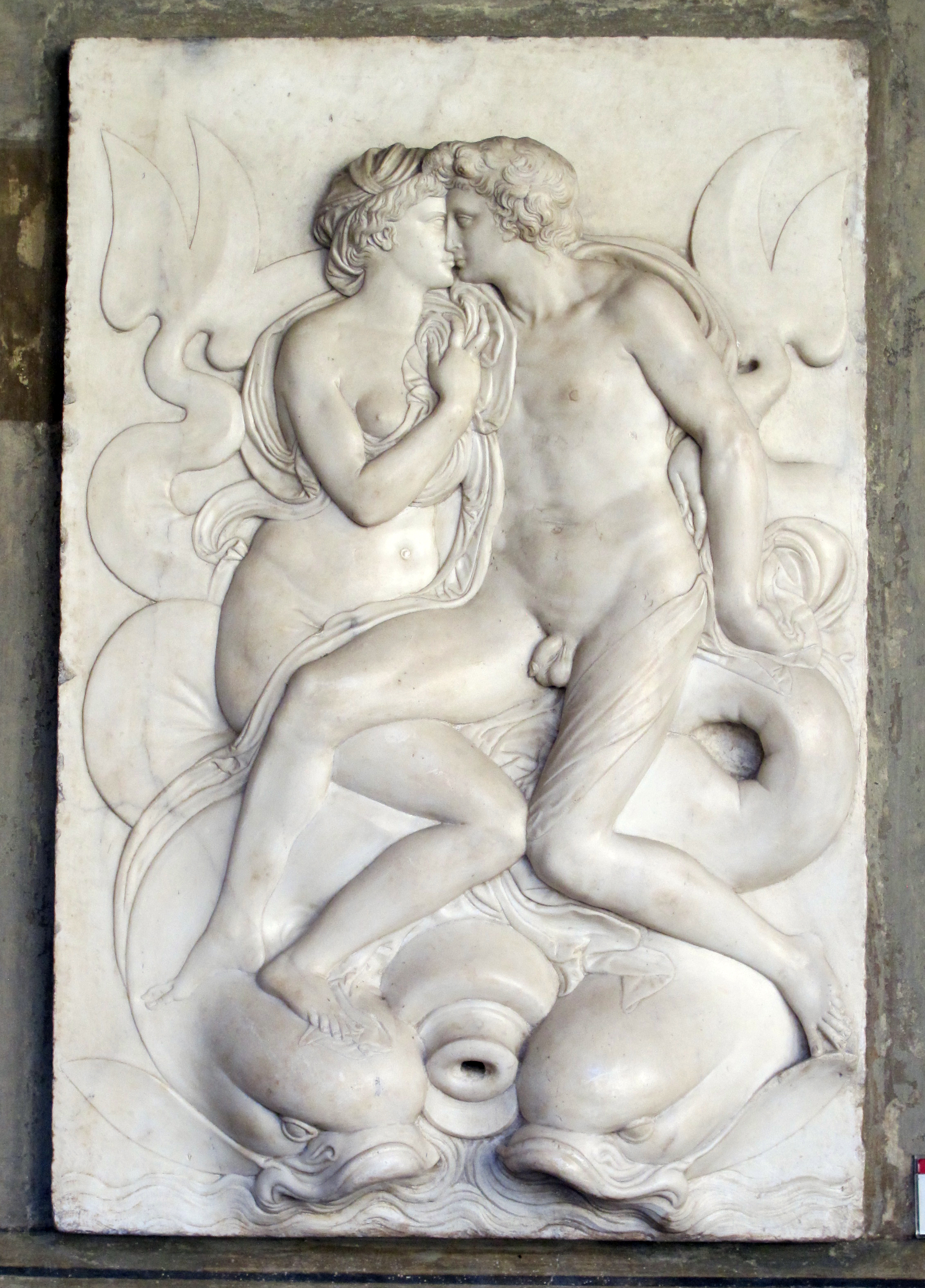
Scultore fiorentino, alfeo e aretusa, 1561–62

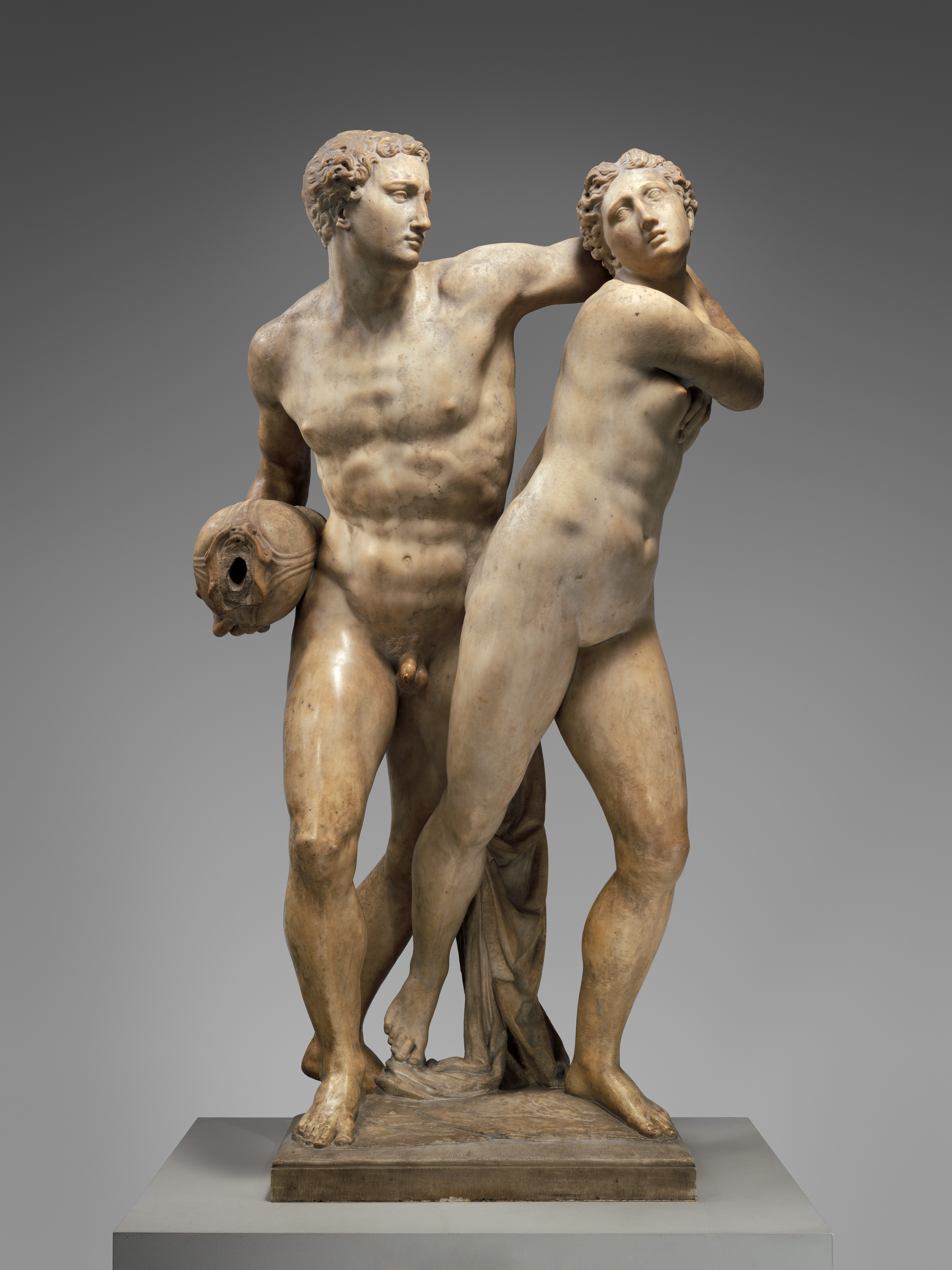
Alpheus and Arethusa by Battista di Domenico Lorenzi (1568–70)

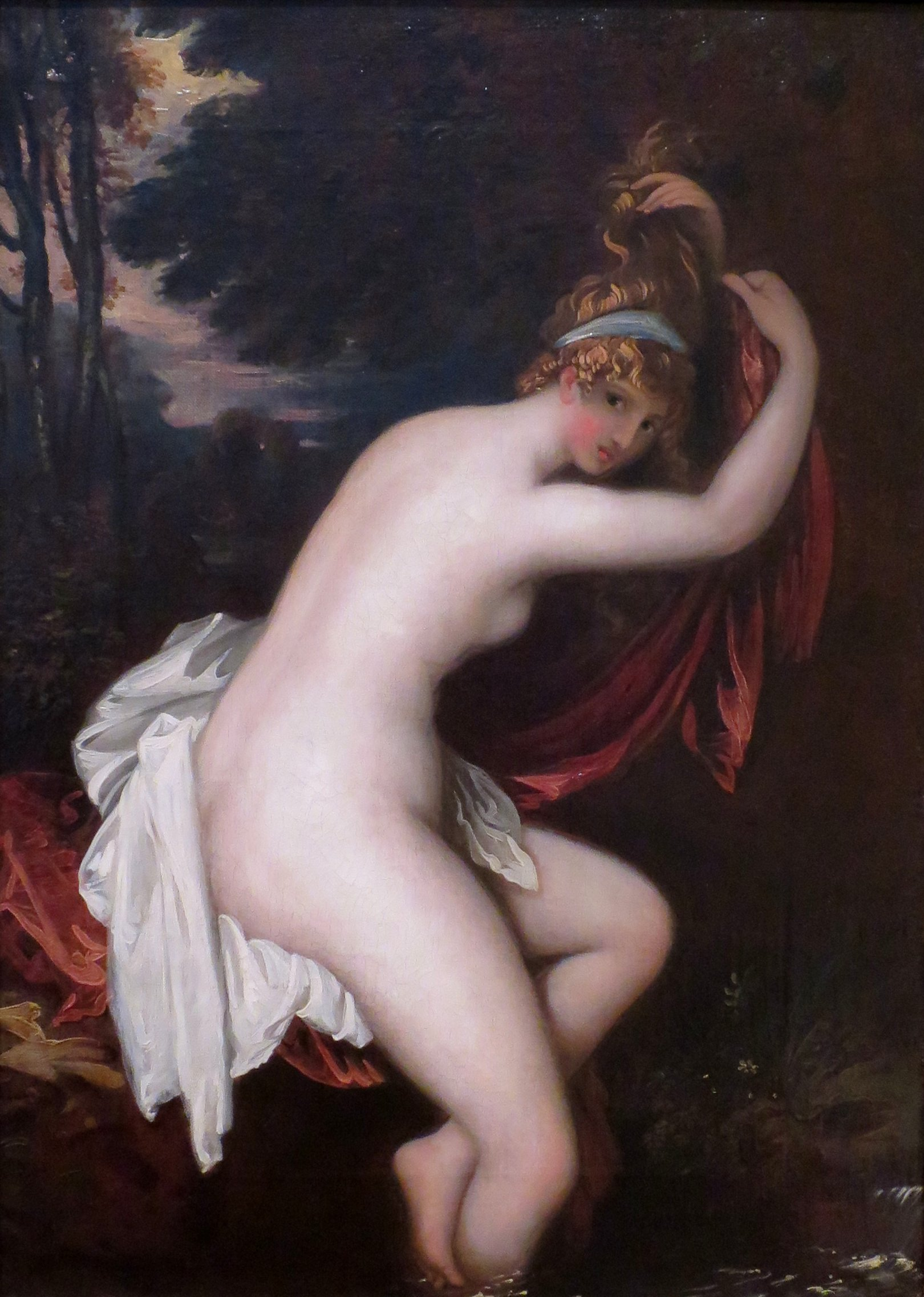
Arethusa by Benjamin West, 1802

== See also ==
- Sarasvati River – Deified river mentioned in the Vedas and ancient Indian epics, the invisible or subterranean mystical river of Hinduism

== Bibliography ==
- Virginia M. Lewis, "Two Sides of the Same Coin: The Ideology of Gelon's Innovative Syracusan Tetradrachm", in Greek, Roman, and Byzantine Studies, 59 (2019), pp. 179–201.
