= Nausidame =

Daughter of Amphidamas in Greek mythology

In Greek mythology, Nausidame (Ancient Greek: Ναυσιδάμη, romanized: Nausidámē) was the daughter of Amphidamas. She consorted with the sun god Helios and became mother of Augeas, king of Elis, by him. Otherwise, the latter was called the son of the Epeian King Eleios, or Poseidon or Phorbas and Hyrmine.
