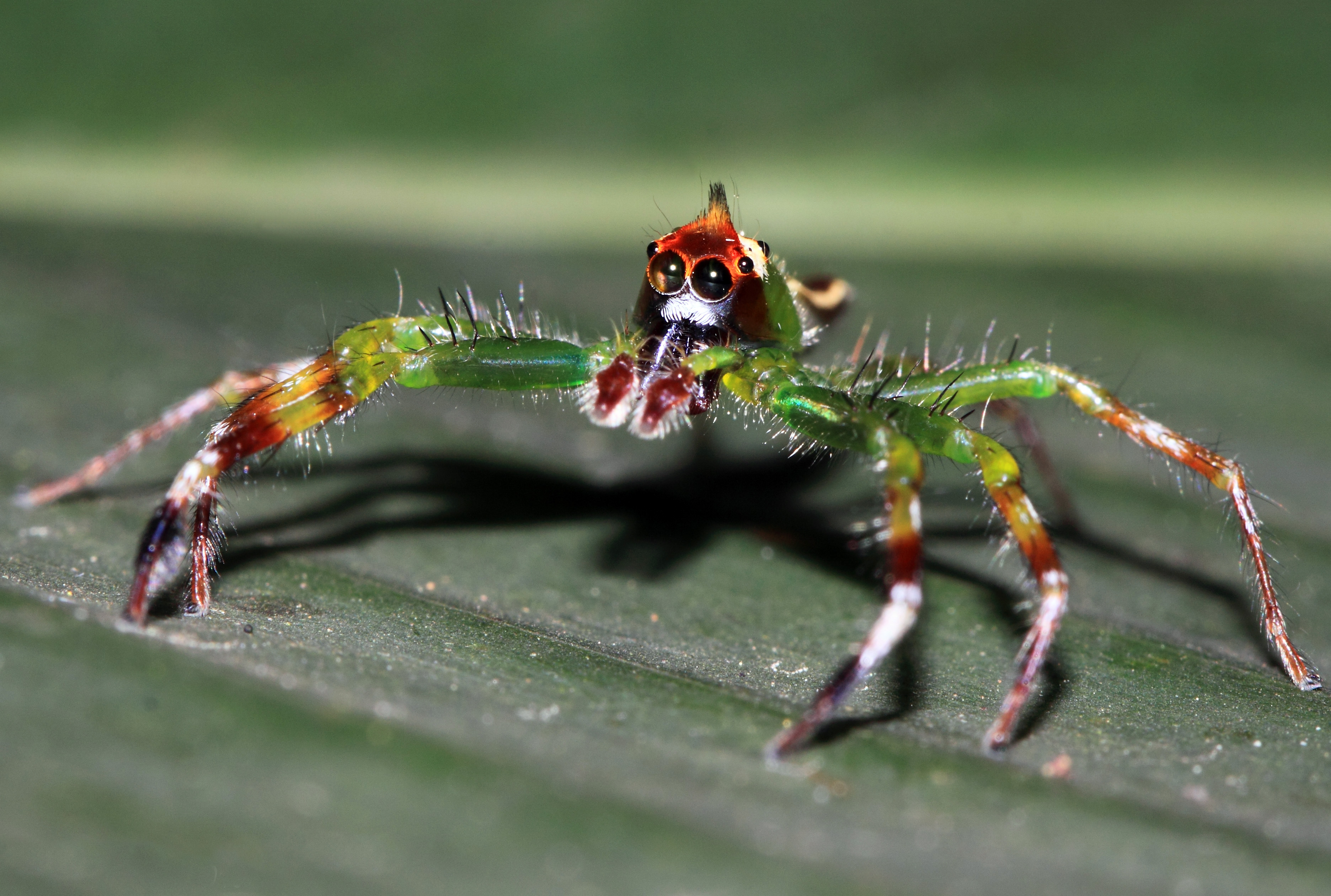
- Male Epeus flavobilineatus

Scientific classification
- Kingdom: Animalia
- Phylum: Arthropoda
- Subphylum: Chelicerata
- Class: Arachnida
- Order: Araneae
- Infraorder: Araneomorphae
- Family: Salticidae
- Subfamily: Salticinae
- Genus: Epeus; Peckham & Peckham, 1886

Type species
- Evenus tener Simon, 1877

Species
- See text.

= Epeus =

Genus of spiders

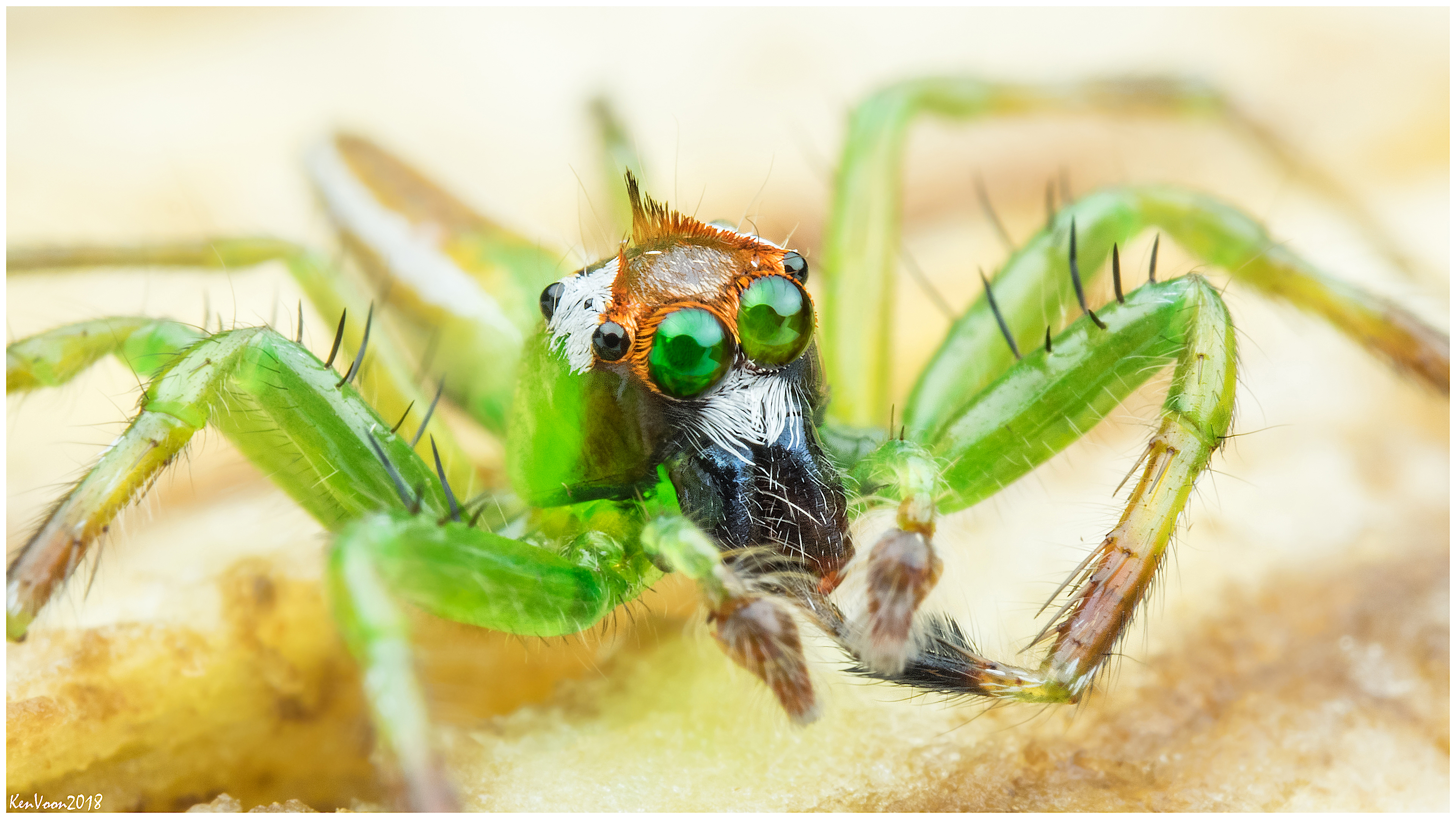
Male Epeus flavobilineatus

Epeus is a genus of the spider family Salticidae (jumping spiders). They are often found on broad-leaved plants or shrubs of rain forest, or in gardens of Southeast Asia.

The genus is similar to Plexippoides.

== Description ==
Like most spiders, they exhibit sexual dimorphism. Females are 7–9 mm long, males 6–9 mm. They are long-legged with a long opisthosoma, and quite colorful. Males have a characteristic v-shaped crest of raised, long hairs on the head, resembling a mohawk.

E. glorius, described in 1985, has a pale orange carapace with a deep orange crest of hairs. The three rear eye pairs have black surrounds with white squamose hairs, the opisthosoma is pale yellow. The four frontal legs of the male are brown with yellowish tarsi at the end, the other four legs are light brown. The legs of the female are pale yellow with black tips.

== Distribution ==
Members of this genus are distributed throughout southern Asia.

== Name ==
The generic name is derived from Epeius of Greek mythology.

== Species ==
As of May 2021, the World Spider Catalog accepts the following species:

- Epeus alboguttatus (Thorell, 1887) – China, Myanmar, Vietnam
- Epeus albus Prószyński, 1992 – India
- Epeus bicuspidatus (Song, Gu & Chen, 1988) – China, Taiwan
- Epeus chilapataensis (Biswas & Biswas, 1992) – India
- Epeus daiqini Patoleta, Gardzińska & Żabka, 2020 – Thailand
- Epeus edwardsi Barrion & Litsinger, 1995 – Philippines
- Epeus exdomus Jastrzebski, 2010 – Nepal
- Epeus flavobilineatus (Doleschall, 1859) – Java
- Epeus furcatus Zhang, Song & Li, 2003 – Singapore
- Epeus glorius Zabka, 1985 – China, Taiwan, Vietnam
- Epeus guangxi Peng & Li, 2002 – China, Taiwan
- Epeus hawigalboguttatus Barrion & Litsinger, 1995 – Philippines
- Epeus indicus Prószyński, 1992 – India
- Epeus mirus (Peckham & Peckham, 1907) – Borneo
- Epeus pallidus Patoleta, Gardzińska & Żabka, 2020 – Thailand
- Epeus sumatranus Prószyński & Deeleman-Reinhold, 2012 – Sumatra
- Epeus szirakii Patoleta, Gardzińska & Żabka, 2020 – Thailand
- Epeus tener (Simon, 1877) – Java
- Epeus triangulopalpis Malamel, Nafin, Sudhikumar & Sebastian, 2019 – India
