= Iphianassa =

Name of several figures in Greek mythology

In Greek mythology, Iphianassa (/ˌɪfiəˈnæsə/; Ancient Greek: Ίφιάνασσα, romanized: Īphianassa or Iphiánassa, lit. 'strong queen' or 'rule strongly') is a name that refers to several characters.

- Iphianassa, one of the 50 Nereids, marine-nymph daughters of the 'Old Man of the Sea' Nereus and the Oceanid Doris.
- Iphianassa, consort of King Endymion of Elis and mother of Aetolus. The wife of Endymion was otherwise known as Asterodia, Chromia, Hyperippe or a nameless Naiad nymph.
- Iphianassa, one of the three Proetids, daughters of the Argive king Proetus by Stheneboea who were purified of their madness by Melampus. Iphianassa eventually married Melampus.
- Iphianassa, a Mycenaean princess as the daughter of King Agamemnon and Clytemnestra, perhaps the same as Iphigenia.
- Iphianassa, mother of Menalces by Medon of Cilla. Her son was killed by Neoptolemus.
