= Naxos (mythology) =

In Greek mythology, Naxos or Naxus (/ˈnæksɒs/ or /naksos/; Ancient Greek: Νάξος Náxos) may refer to three possible eponyms of the island of Naxos:

- Naxos, son of Endymion and thus, possibly the brother of Aetolus, Paeon, Epeius and Eurycyda.
- Naxos, son of Apollo and Acacallis, daughter of Minos. His brothers could be Cydon, Amphithemis, Oaxes, Miletus, Phylacides and Phylander who were called offspring of Apollo and Acacallis.
- Naxos, son of Polemon and father of Leucippus. When the Carians coming from Latmia moved to the island of Strongyle (old name for Naxos) and making it their home, they made Naxos an upright and famous man to be their king.
