= Epeius of Elis =

Mythological king of Elis

Epeius (Ancient Greek: Ἐπειός) was a son of the king of Elis, Endymion. Epeius had three siblings, two brothers, Paeon and Aetolus, and a sister, Eurycyda. Ancient traditions differed concerning their mother: some named Asterodia, others Chromia, the daughter of Itonus, while others identified her as Hyperippe, the daughter of Arcas.

Endymion had his sons compete in a footrace at Olympia for the right to succeed him as king. Epeius emerged victorious and inherited the kingdom. From his reign onward, his subjects were known as the Epeans for the first time. Paeon, angered by his defeat, withdrew into a distant exile, and the land beyond the River Axius that he settled became known as Paeonia after him. Aetolus, meanwhile, remained in Elis.

Epeius married Anaxiroe, the daughter of Coronus. They had a daughter named Hyrmine but no male children.

During the reign of Epeius, Oenomaus, who ruled the land of Pisa, was defeated by Pelops the Lydian, who had crossed over from Asia. After the death of Oenomaus, Pelops took possession of the land of Pisa and the neighboring country of Olympia, separating it from the land of Epeius. The Eleans said that Pelops was the first to found a temple of Hermes in the Peloponnesus and to sacrifice to the god in order to avert the wrath of Hermes for the death of Myrtilus, the charioteer of Oenomaus and son of Hermes.

After the death of Epeius, the throne passed to his brother Aetolus because Epeius left no male heir.

Stephanus of Byzantium writes that also Naxos was a son of Endymion and so a brother of Epeius.
