= Hagnias =

Mythical father of Tiphys

Hagnias or Agnius (Ancient Greek: Ἅγνιος or Ἄγνιος) was, in Greek mythology, the Siphaean father of Tiphys, who was the pilot of the ship Argo, whence Tiphys is called Agniades.
