= Hyrmine =

Woman in Greek mythology

In Greek mythology, Hyrmine (/hərˈmaɪni/; Ancient Greek: Ὑρμίνη Hyrmínē [hyːrmínɛː]) or Hyrmina was an Elean princess. The town of Hyrmine, named after her, was founded by her son Actor.

== Family ==
Hyrmina was the daughter of Neleus, Nycteus, or, according to others, of Epeius and Anaxiroe, and the sister of Alector (though others assert she was an only child). She was married to Phorbas and became the mother of the Argonauts Augeas, Actor, Tiphys and a daughter, Diogeneia.

The natural father of Augeas by her may have been Helios. Otherwise, Helios and Nausidame or Eleios or Poseidon were called the parents of Augeas.
