= Tiphys =

Helmsman of the Argonauts in Greek legend

In Greek mythology, Tiphys (/ˈtaɪfɪs/; Ancient Greek: Τῖφυς Tîphus) was the helmsman of the Argonauts.

== Family ==
Tiphys was the Thespian son of Hagnias or of Phorbas of Elis and Hyrmine, daughter of Epeius. In the latter account, he was possibly the brother of Augeas and Actor.

== Mythology ==
=== Pilot of Argo ===
Among his crew members, Tiphys was chosen to steer the long ship Argo.

==== Apollonius' account ====
Tiphys, son of Hagnias, left the Siphaean people of the Thespians, well skilled to foretell the rising wave on the broad sea, and well skilled to infer from sun and star the stormy winds and the time for sailing. Tritonian Athena herself urged him to join the band of chiefs, and he came among them a welcome comrade.

==== Valerius' account ====
. . . Tiphys without fear trust to rule the vessel and to watch the heavens, when weary-eyed with ceaseless gazing on the bear.

The watchful Tiphys, Hagnius’ son, hung his gaze upon the Arcadian constellation, favoured mortal, that found use for the laggard stars, and giving men power to steer their path across the sea with heaven as their guide.

Tiphys is at the helm, and silently his helpers sit to do his bidding; even as by the throne of highest Jupiter all things are round about him alert and ready for the god, winds, showers, lightning, thunder, and rivers still in their springs.

==== Statius' account ====
Tiphys himself wearies by his labours the heavy billows and the tiller that will not hear him, and pale with anxiety oft changes his commands, and turns right- and leftward from the land the prow that would fain dash itself to shipwreck on the rocks, until from the vessel's tapering bows the son of Aeson holds forth the olive-branch of Pallas hat Mopsus bore, and through the tumult of his comrades would prevent him, asks for peace; his words were swept away by the headlong gale.

==== Orphic Argonautica ====
He (Tiphys) left the Thespians to work on the waters of Teumessia near the mountain of poplars. He knew the painstaking art of discerning from the bellowing and flashing of storms when and how to guide the ship.

=== Death ===
During the voyage to Colchis, Tiphys died of a mysterious illness in the land of the Mariandynians or, according to some sources, a snakebite. After his death, Ancaeus piloted the Argo.
