= Actor (mythology) =

Set of Greek mythical characters

Actor (Ancient Greek: Ἄκτωρ; gen.: Ἄκτoρος, romanized: Áktōr or Aktoros) is a very common name in Greek mythology. Here is a selection of characters that share this name (which means 'leader', from the verb άγω: to lead or carry):

- Actor, father of Eurytus who was an ally of Phineus during his fight with Perseus.
- Actor, a king of Phthia, was said to be the son of King Myrmidon and Peisidice, daughter of Aeolus. Some say that Actor died childless, but others say that he is the father of Eurytion, his successor or of Irus, who was also called the father of Eurytion. According to Diodorus, Actor without an heir, was succeeded by Peleus who fled to his country from Aegina for killing his half-brother, Phocus. The hero was then purified by the king for his sins. This story was usually attributed to Actor's possible son Eurytion who was slain accidentally by his son-in-law Peleus. In another account, Actor initially married Polyboea but afterwards wedded Aegina, daughter of the river god Asopus, and had several children, among them Menoetius. The latter was counted among the Argonauts, and was the father of Patroclus (Achilles' very close companion). When Actor's children plotted against Peleus, the latter drove them out of the kingdom and Actor gave his daughter Polymela to the hero and handed over the kingship to him; from this union was born a daughter named Polydora, and a son, Achilles.
- Actor, son of King Deioneus of Phocis and Diomede, daughter of Xuthus, thus a brother of Asterodeia, Aenetus, Phylacus, and Cephalus. This Actor could be the man referred by Hesiod as the father of Protesilaus, one of the suitors of Helen of Troy.
- Actor, son of Azeus, descendant of Phrixus, was ruler of the Minyans of Orchomenus. He was father of Astyoche, who was seduced by the war-god Ares and bore him twin sons, named Ascalaphus and Ialmenus. These last two led the Minyan contingent to the Trojan War.
- Actor, son of Phorbas and Hyrmine, thus a brother of Augeas and Tiphys. He was king of Elis, and founded the city of Hyrmina, which he named after his mother. This Actor married Molione and became by her father of the twins known as the Molionides, Eurytus and Cteatus.
- Actor, the Elean son of Poseidon and Agamede, daughter of King Augeas. He was the brother of Belus and Dictys.
- Actor and Eurythemis were in one source called parents of Ancaeus (who other sources call the son of Lycurgus) and grandparents of Agapenor.
- Actor, the Achaean son of Hippasus from Pellene and one of the Argonauts.
- Actor, a Lapith. He was killed by the centaur Clanis.
- Actor, father of Sthenelus. Sthenelus followed Heracles in his campaign against the Amazons and was killed by them.
- Actor, son of Acastus, was accidentally killed by Peleus while hunting. As a retribution, Peleus sent to Acastus some cows and sheep that had been killed by a wolf sent by Thetis.
- Actor, son of Oenops, brother of Hyperbius. He was among the defenders of the Borraean Gate at Thebes when the Seven against Thebes attacked the city, and confronted Parthenopaeus at the gate.
- Actor, a warrior in the army of the Seven against Thebes. He saw a chasm open in the earth that swallowed Amphiaraus.
- Actor, an old Theban servant of Antigone, the daughter of Oedipus. During the war of the Seven against Thebes, he accompanied her to the walls when that army appeared in front of the barriers outside the city. Because of his age, Actor cannot follow the princess and he just stayed halfway up the climb to listen to her lament when she saw her brother in the enemy army.
- Actor, father of Echecles. His son married Polymele, mother of Eudoros by Hermes.
- Actor, a shepherd in Lemnos who befriended Philoctetes in Euripides' play Philoctetes. According to some accounts, he was instead the king of Lemnos whose shepherd named Iphimachus, son of Dolops, took care the abandoned hero after he was bitten by a snake.
- Actor, one of the companions of the exiled Aeneas. He is probably the same who in another passage is called an Auruncan, and of whose conquered lance Turnus made a boast. This story seems to have given rise to the proverbial saying "Actoris spolium" ("the spoil of Actor"), for any poor spoil in general.
- Actor, father of Actoris (though unnamed in the Odyssey) who was given by Icarius to his daughter Penelope after her wedding with Odysseus to serve as her personal handmaiden.
