= Epeius =

Mythological Greek characters

There were two characters named Epeius (/ɪˈpaɪ.əs/; Ancient Greek: Ἐπειός Epeiós) or Epeus in Greek mythology.

- Epeius, an Elean prince as son of King Endymion. He ran a race at Olympia, against his brothers Aetolus and Paeon, winning his father's kingdom. Epeius' other siblings were Eurycyda and possibly Naxos. He was married to Anaxiroe, daughter of Coronus, and had one daughter, Hyrmine. King Oenomaus of Pisa was his contemporary. From him, the Epei derived their name.
- Epeius, a Greek soldier during the Trojan War and builder of the Trojan horse.
- Epeius, according to Eusebius, Epeius was one of the sons of Aethlius who, along with Endymion, was responsible for overseeing the sacrifices connected with the early Olympic festival.

== Namesake ==
- 2148 Epeios, Jovian asteroid
