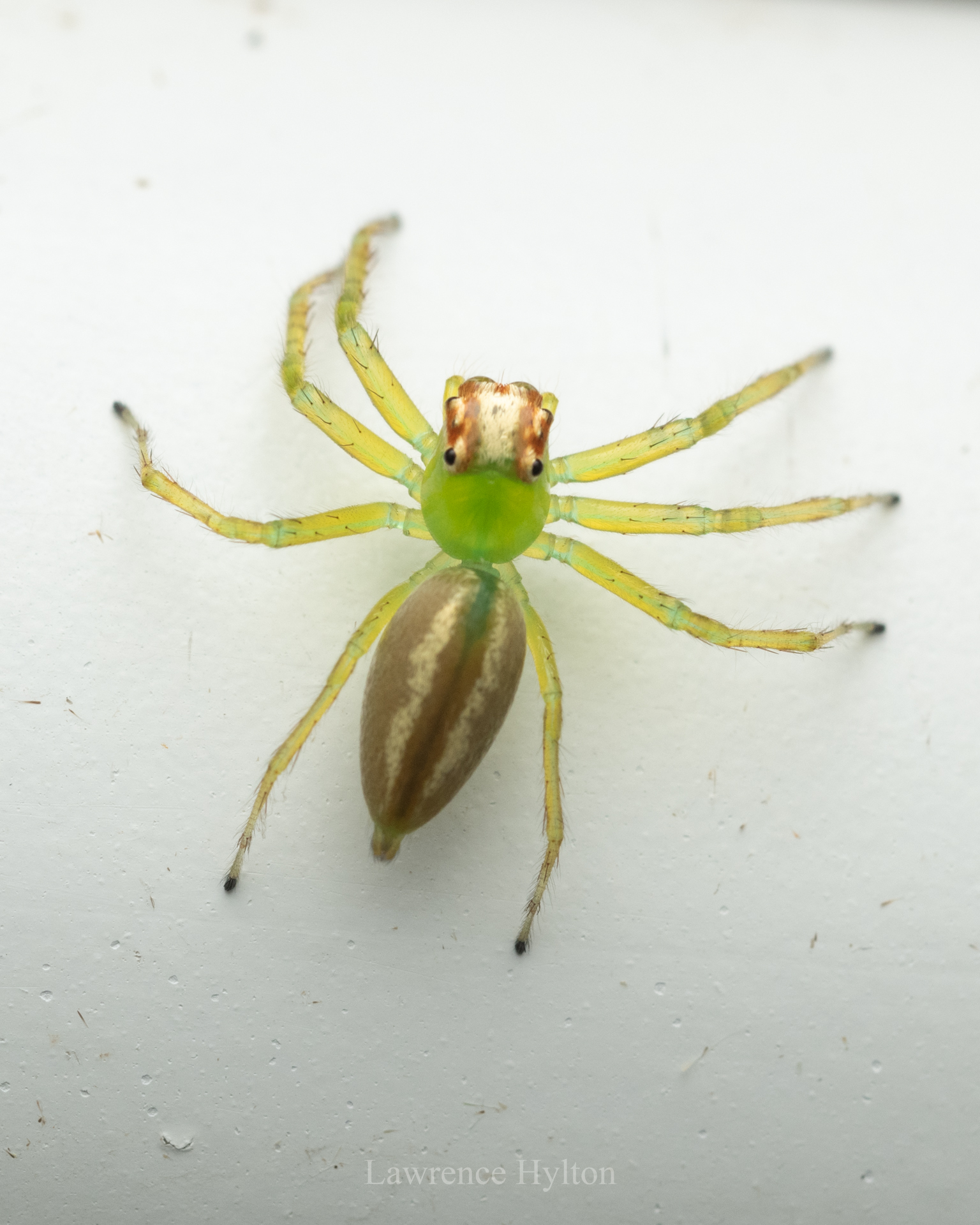
- female from Hong Kong
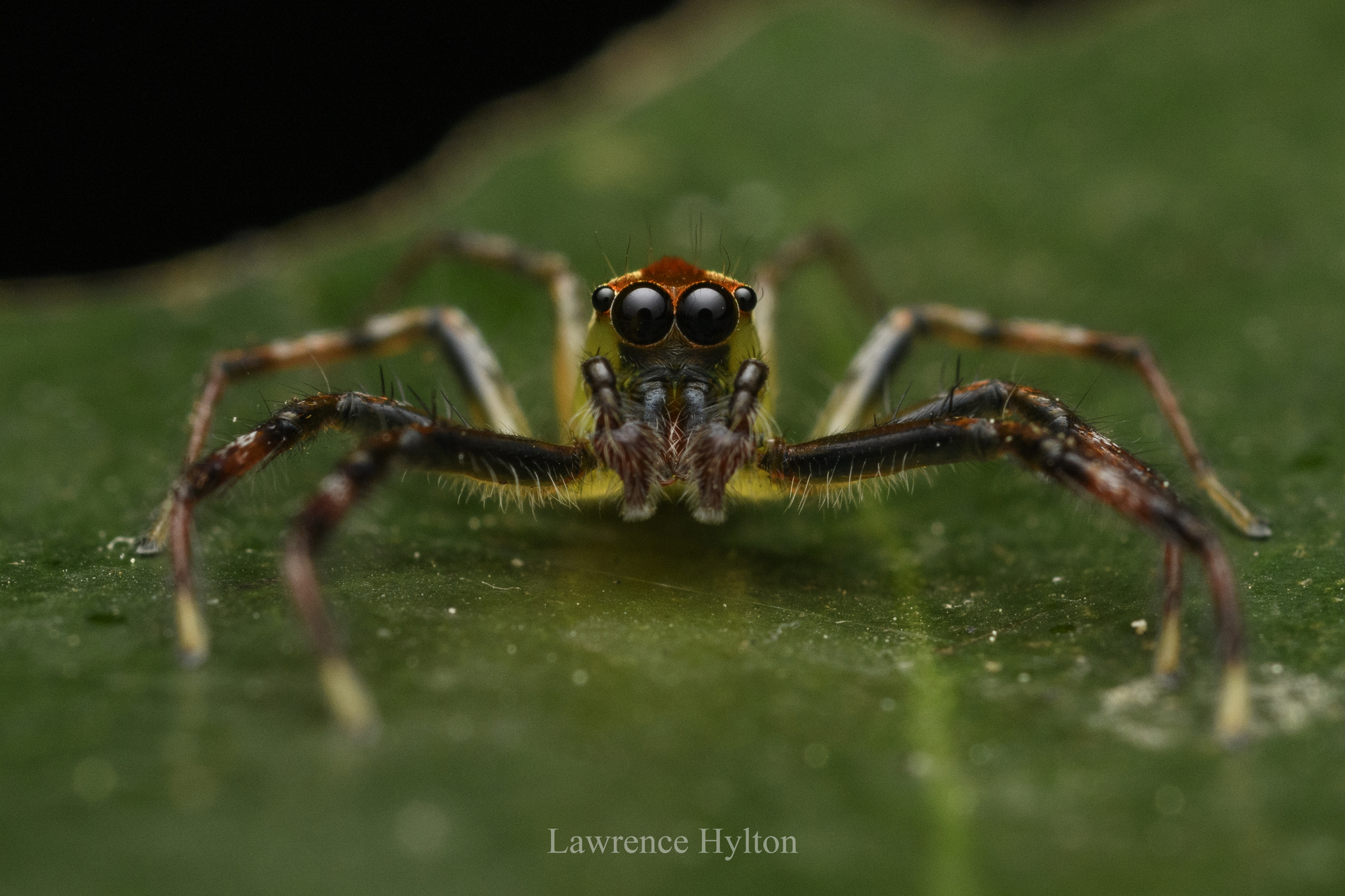
- male from Hong Kong

Scientific classification
- Kingdom: Animalia
- Phylum: Arthropoda
- Subphylum: Chelicerata
- Class: Arachnida
- Order: Araneae
- Infraorder: Araneomorphae
- Family: Salticidae
- Genus: Epeus
- Species: E. glorius

Binomial name
- Epeus glorius Żabka, 1985

= Epeus glorius =

Species of jumping spider

Epeus glorius is a species of jumping spider in the genus Epeus. It was first described by Marek Żabka in 1985.

== Distribution ==
E. glorius is distributed across several countries in Asia. It has been recorded from China (Chongqing, Yunnan, Guangdong, and Guangxi provinces), Vietnam, and Malaysia.

== Description ==
Males of E. glorius have a total length of 6.80–8 mm. The carapace is light brown with sparse hair, and the sides and front margin of the eye region have sparse white hair. The abdomen is slender and cylindrical, with a light brownish-yellow dorsal surface lacking distinct markings.

The species can be distinguished from similar species in the genus by the male's long cymbial apophysis, which is armed with small serrula on its ventral edge, and the well-developed retrolateral tibial apophysis.

Females have a total length of approximately 10 mm and can be identified by the widely separated copulatory openings with two depressions between them.

== Taxonomy ==
The holotype male specimen is deposited in the Museum and Institute of Zoology, Polish Academy of Sciences, Warsaw, Poland. The female of the species was first described in 2015 by Meng, Zhang & Shi based on specimens from Chongqing, China.
