= Hyrmine (Elis) =

Town of ancient Elis

Coordinates: 37°53′11″N 21°08′08″E

Hyrmine (Ancient Greek: Ὑρμίνη) or Hyrmina (Ὕρμινα) or Hormina (Ὅρμινα) was a town of ancient Elis upon the coast. It is mentioned by Homer in the Catalogue of Ships of the Iliad as one of the towns of the Epeii. It appears to have been regarded as one of the most ancient of the Epeian towns, since Pausanias repeats the legend that it had been founded by Actor, the son of Hyrmine, who was a daughter of Epeius, and describes the town as between the cape of Cyllene near Araxus, near the frontier with Achaea. In the time of Strabo the town had disappeared, but its site was marked by a rocky promontory near Cyllene, called Hormina or Hyrmina.

Hyrmine is located near the castle of Chlemoutsi.
