= Phoenissa (mythology) =

In Greek mythology, Phoenissa (Ancient Greek: Φοίνισσα) was the daughter of Alphionis (the river-god Alpheus). She bore to Zeus, a beautiful son, Endymion. Otherwise, the latter's parents were called Aethlius (Aethnos) and Calyce.
