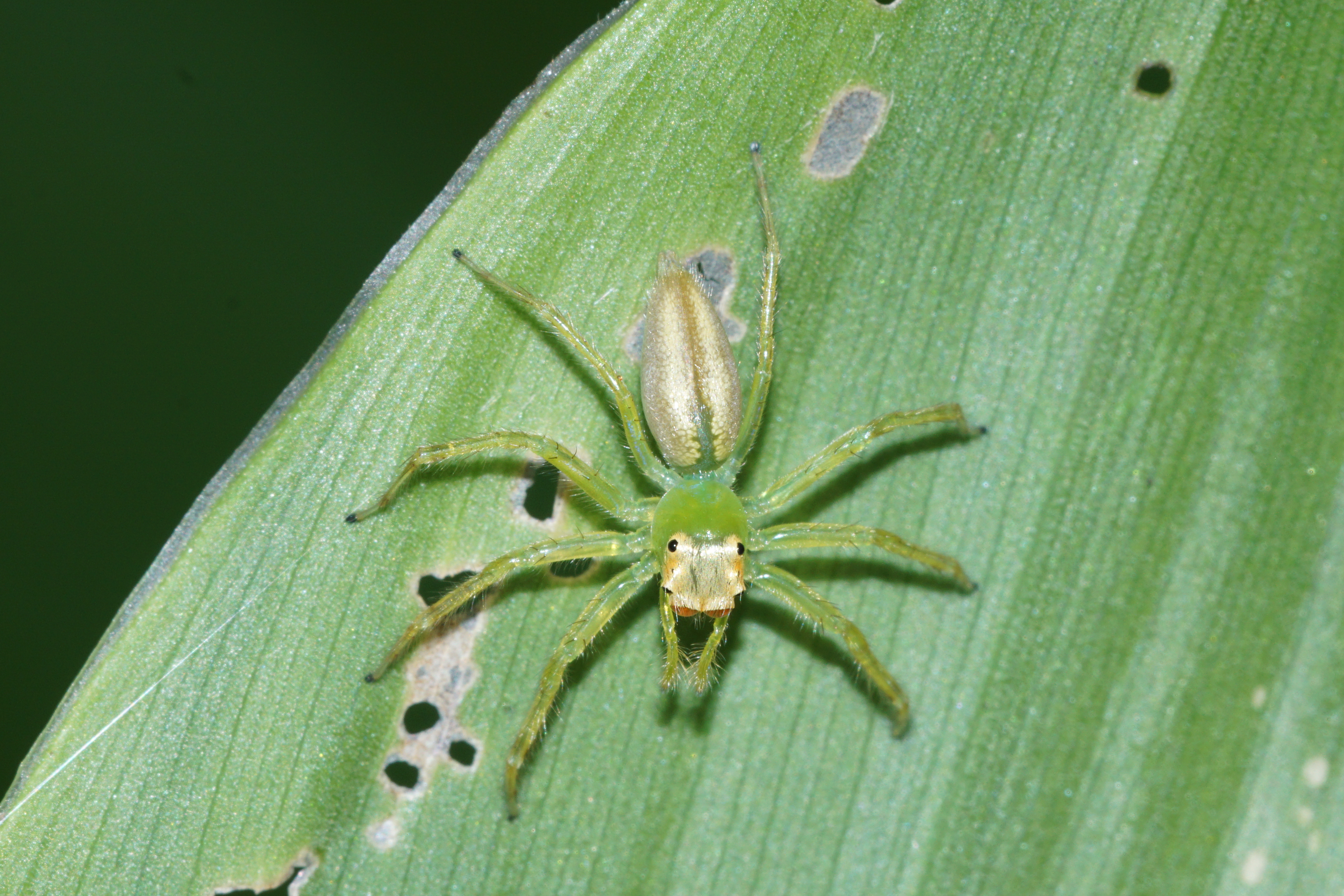
- female from India
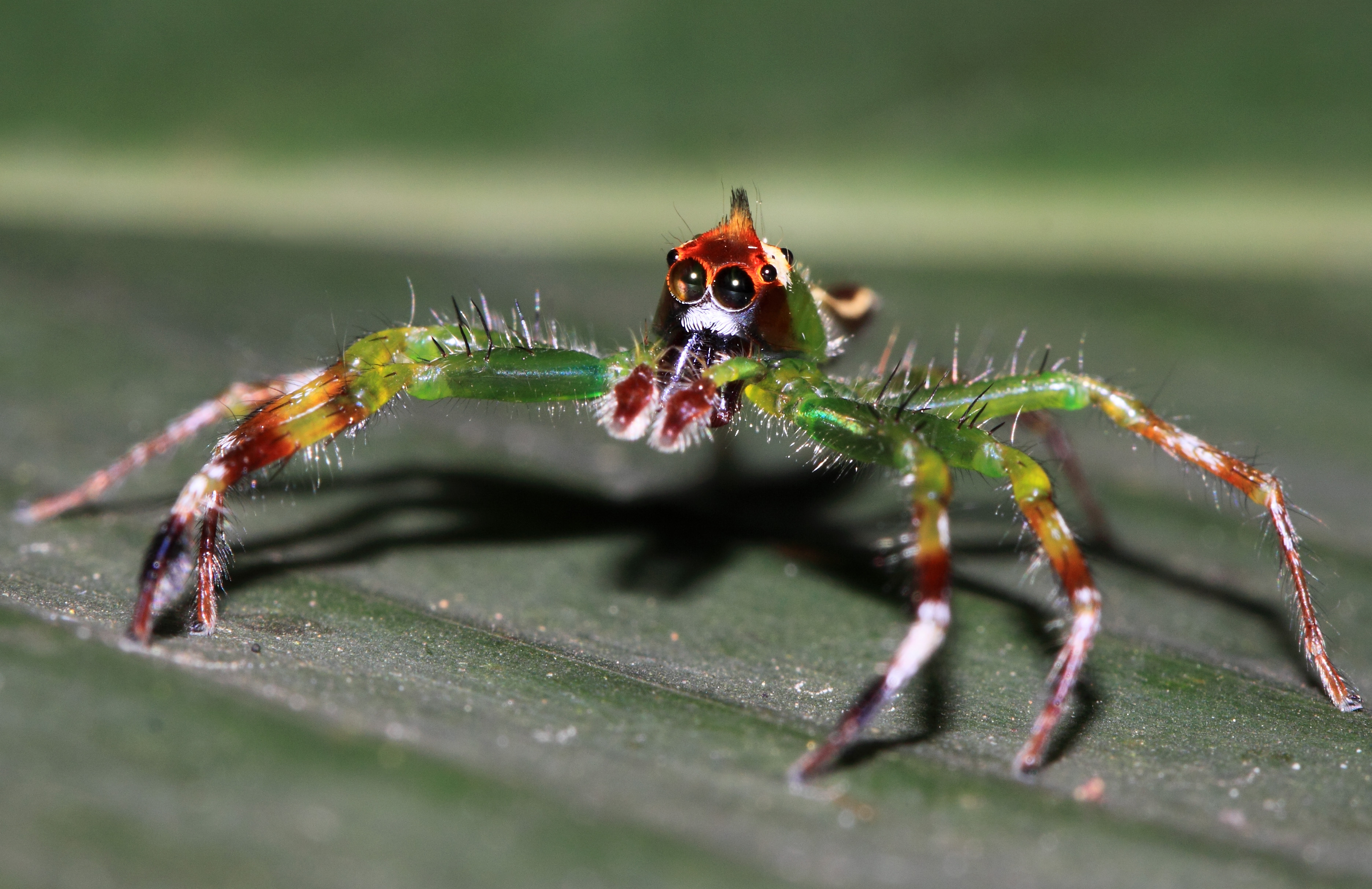
- male from Indonesia

Scientific classification
- Kingdom: Animalia
- Phylum: Arthropoda
- Subphylum: Chelicerata
- Class: Arachnida
- Order: Araneae
- Infraorder: Araneomorphae
- Family: Salticidae
- Genus: Epeus
- Species: E. flavobilineatus

Binomial name
- Epeus flavobilineatus (Doleschall, 1859)

Synonyms
- Salticus flavobilineatus Doleschall, 1859; Evenus tener Simon, 1877; Epeus tener (Simon, 1877); Viciria cristata Thorell, 1887; Viciria flavo-bilineata Thorell, 1892; Viciria tenera Simon, 1903

= Epeus flavobilineatus =

Yellow-lined Epeus

Species of spider

Epeus flavobilineatus is a species of jumping spider in the family Salticidae. Originally described from Java in 1859, it has a wide distribution across Southeast Asia and southern China.

== Taxonomy ==
Epeus flavobilineatus was first described in 1859 by Carl Ludwig Doleschall as Salticus flavobilineatus, based on a single female specimen from Banten Province, Java. The species name refers to the two longitudinal lemon-yellow stripes on the dorsal abdomen, from the Latin flavo- (yellow) and bilineatus (two-lined).

The taxonomic history of this species has been complex, with several names being applied to what are now considered the same species. Eugène Simon described Evenus tener in 1877, and Tamerlan Thorell described Viciria cristata in 1887, both of which were later recognized as synonyms. In 1984, Jerzy Prószyński transferred the species to the genus Epeus, though this transfer was initially considered provisional due to the absence of the original type specimen.

Recent work by Hill (2025) has resolved the taxonomic confusion by formally synonymizing Epeus tener with E. flavobilineatus and removing the species from nomen dubium status.

== Distribution ==
E. flavobilineatus has been recorded from China, Vietnam, Myanmar, Thailand, Malaysia, Indonesia, and the Philippines. The species appears to be widespread throughout the Sunda Shelf region, from the Malay Peninsula to Java and Sulawesi.

== Description ==
Males of E. flavobilineatus are distinctive and mostly translucent green in coloration. They possess a prominent crest of long setae at the rear of the eye region.

Females are more difficult to identify and require examination of the epigyne for reliable species identification, as they may superficially resemble other Epeus species such as E. albus.

The original description by Doleschall noted that the species is slender, with a pale green abdomen bearing two longitudinal thin lemon-yellow stripes that merge at both ends. The legs are slightly longer than the body and pale yellowish in color.
