= Chromia =

In Greek mythology, Chromia (/ˈkroʊmiə/; Ancient Greek: Χρωμία, Khrōmía) was the daughter of Itonus, son of Amphictyon, himself son of Deucalion. She was also, in some traditions, the mother of Aetolus, Paeon, Epeius and Eurycyda by Endymion.

The poem Endymion, a Tale of Greece, by Henry B. Hirst (1848) is a modern retelling of the legend of Endymion and Chromia.
