= Augeas =

Greek mythical character

In Greek mythology, Augeas (/ɔːˈdʒiːəs/, Ancient Greek: Αὐγείας, romanized: Augeías, lit. 'bright'), also called Aegeus, was king of Elis and father of Epicaste. Some ancient authors say that Augeas was one of the Argonauts. He is known for his stables, which housed the single greatest number of cattle in the country and had never been cleaned, until the time of the great hero Heracles. The derivative adjective augean came to signify a challenging task, typically improving or fixing something that is currently in a bad condition.

== Family ==
Augeas's lineage varies in the sources: he was said to be either the son of Helios either by Nausidame or Iphiboe, or of Eleios, or of Poseidon, or of Phorbas and Hyrmine. In the latter account, Augeas was probably the brother of Actor, Tiphys and Diogeneia. His children were Epicaste, Phyleus, Agamede, Agasthenes, Eurytus and Ambracia.

Comparative table of Augeas's family
Relation	Names	Sources									
Relation	Names	Homer	Theocritus	Apollonius	Diodorus	Strabo	Apollodorus	Orphic Argo	Pausanias	Hyginus	Tzetzes
Parents	Helios		Yes	Yes			Yes	Yes	Yes		
Parents	Phorbas and Hyrmine						Yes				
Parents	Poseidon						Yes				
Parents	Eleios								Yes		
Parents	Helios and Nausidame									Yes	
Parents	Phorbas				Yes						
Parents	Helios and Iphiboe										
Sibling	Actor				Yes		Yes				
Children	Agasthenes	Yes							Yes		
Children	Agamede	Yes								Yes	
Children	Phyleus		Yes			Yes	Yes		Yes		
Children	Eurytus				Yes						
Children	Epicaste						Yes				

== Mythology ==
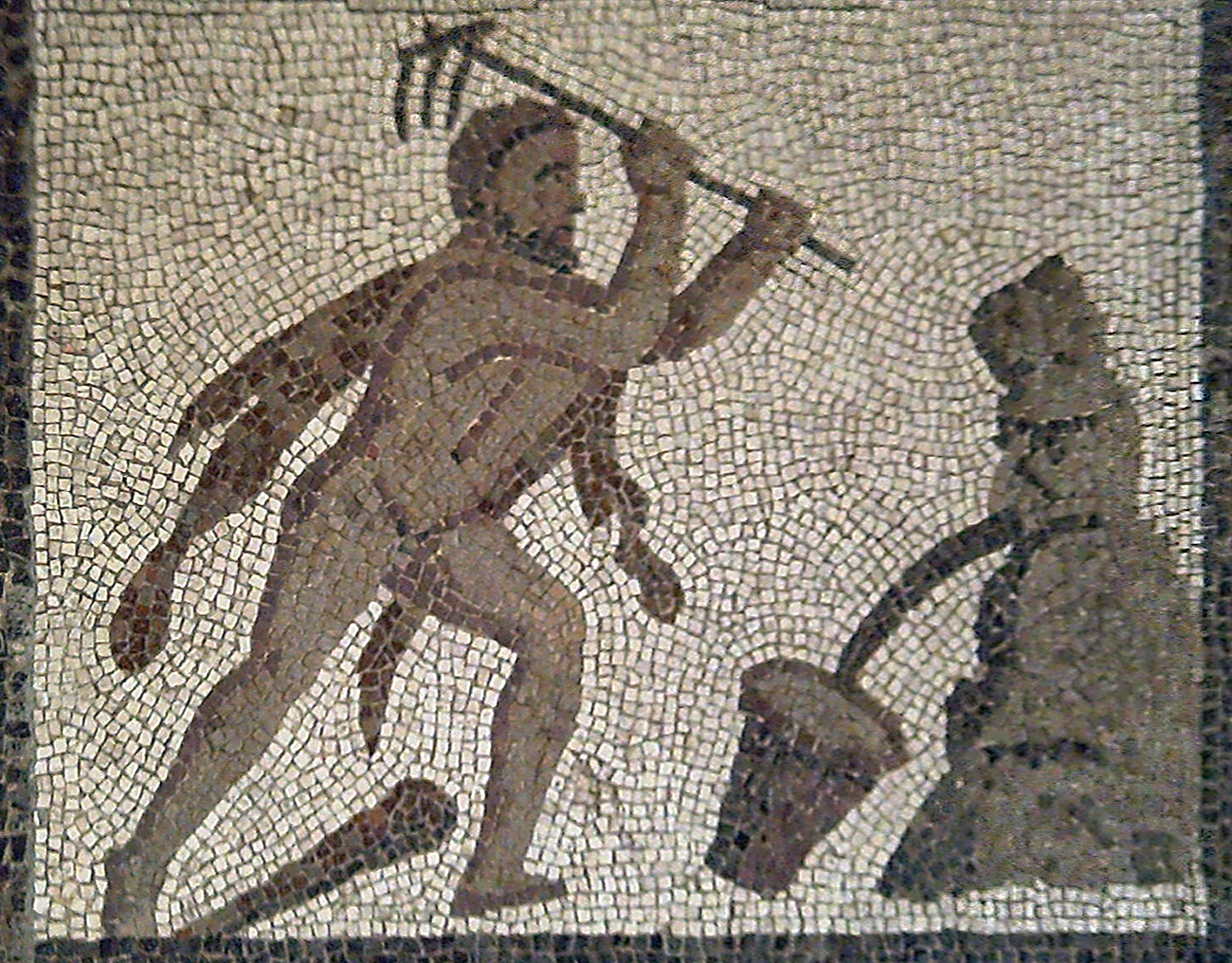
Heracles rerouting the rivers Alpheus and Peneus, to clean out the Augean stables. Roman mosaic, 3rd century AD.

The fifth Labour of Heracles (Hercules in Latin) was to clean the Augean (/ɔːˈdʒiːən/) stables. Eurystheus intended this assignment both as humiliating (rather than impressive, like the previous labours) and as impossible, since the livestock were divinely healthy (immortal) and therefore produced an enormous quantity of dung (ἡ ὄνθος). Three thousand cattle lived in the stables, which had not been cleaned in over thirty years. However, Heracles succeeded by rerouting the rivers Alpheus and Peneus to wash out the filth.

Augeas reacted angrily because he had promised Heracles one tenth of his cattle if the job was finished in one day. He refused to honour the agreement, and Heracles killed him after completing the tasks. Heracles gave Augeas's kingdom to Phyleus, Augeas's son, who had been exiled for supporting Heracles against his father.

According to the odes of the poet Pindar, Heracles then founded the Olympic Games:

the games which by the ancient tomb of Pelops the mighty Heracles founded, after that he slew Kleatos, Poseidon's godly son, and slew also Eurytos, that he might wrest from tyrannous Augeas against his will reward for service done.

Eurystheus discounted the success of this labour because the rushing waters had done the work of cleaning the stables and because Heracles was paid. Stating that Heracles still had seven labours to do, Eurystheus then sent Heracles to defeat the Stymphalian Birds.
