= Greek, Roman, and Byzantine Studies =

- Discipline: Classics
- Language: English
- Edited by: Joshua D. Sosin, José Gonzáles

Publication details
- History: 1958-present
- Publisher: Duke University Press (United States)
- Frequency: Quarterly

Standard abbreviations
- ISO 4: Greek Rom. Byz. Stud.

Links
- Journal homepage

Greek, Roman, and Byzantine Studies is a quarterly peer-reviewed academic journal established in 1958 by John J. Bilitz. It is published by Duke University Press and devoted to the culture and history of Greece from Antiquity to the Renaissance, featuring research on all aspects of the Hellenic world from prehistoric antiquity through the Ancient Greek, Roman, and Byzantine periods, including studies of modern classical scholarship. The editors-in-chief are Joshua D. Sosin and José Gonzáles (Duke University). Kent J. Rigsby is associate editor.
