= Eurycyda =

In Greek mythology, Eurycyda (Ancient Greek: Εὐρυκύδα, romanized: Eurykúda) was an Elean princess as the daughter of King Endymion of Elis by either Asterodia, Chromia or Hyperippe. Her name was derived from the Greek elements eurys ("wide" or "broad") and kydos (often interpreted as "glory" or "renown"), suggesting a meaning of "wide-glory" or "far-famed". Several authors refer to her as "Eurypyle".

== Family ==
Eurycyda's brothers were Aetolus, Epeius, Paeon and possibly Naxos. With Poseidon, she mothered Eleius whom the region of Elis was named after, as was its people, the Eleans.
