= Siphae =

Fortified coastal town of Boeotia, ancient Greece

Coordinates: 38°11′24″N 23°03′10″E

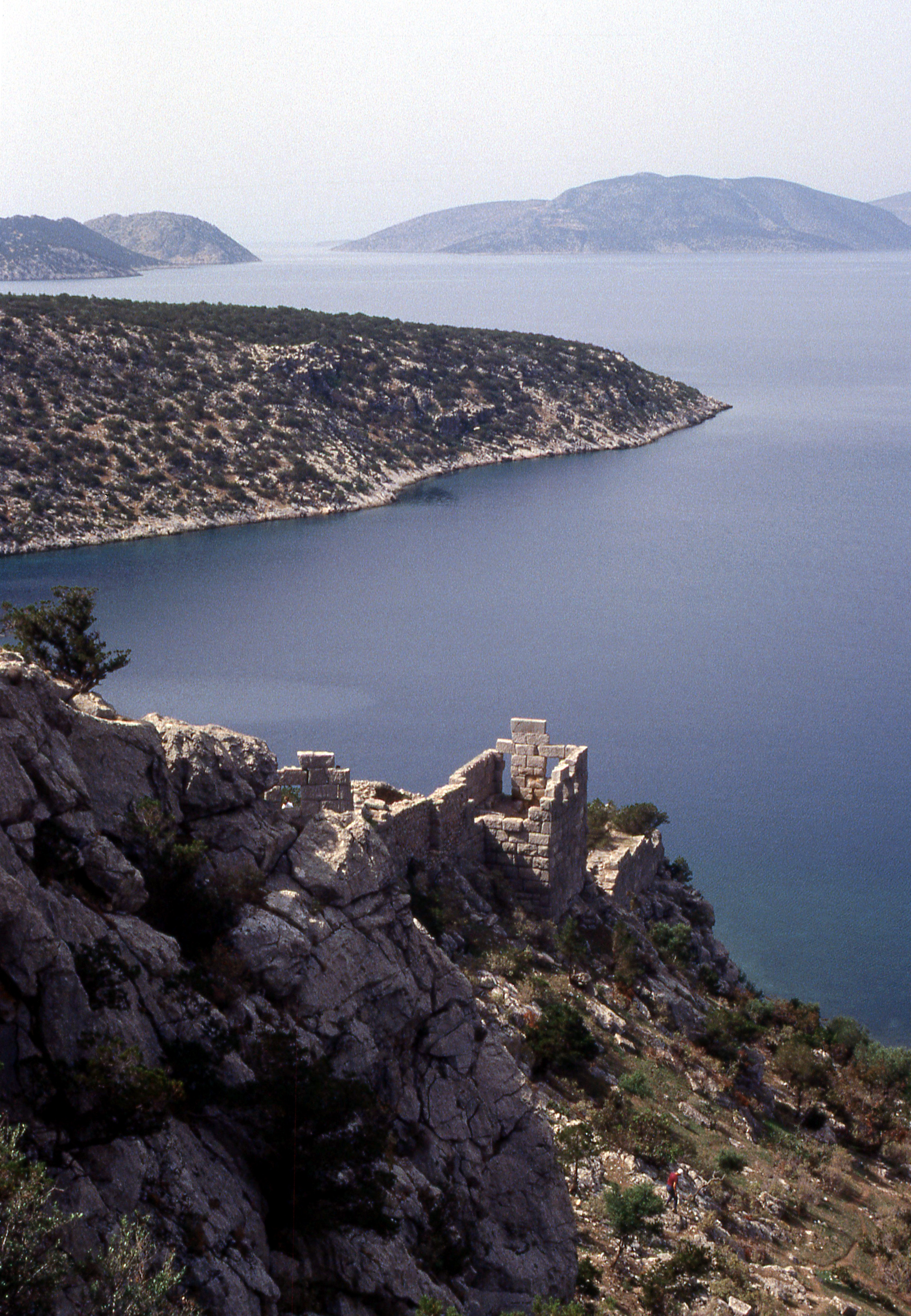
The site of Siphai overlooking the Corinthian Gulf

Siphae or Siphai (Ancient Greek: Σῖφαι), also known as Tipha (Τίφα), was a town of ancient Boeotia, upon the Corinthian Gulf, which was said to have derived its name from Tiphys, the pilot of the Argonauts. In the time of Pausanias the inhabitants of Siphae pointed out the spot where the ship Argo anchored on its return from its celebrated voyage. The same writer mentions a temple of Heracles at Siphae, in whose honour an annual festival was celebrated. Apollonius Rhodius and Stephanus of Byzantium describe Siphae as a dependency of Thespiae.

Its site is located near modern Aliki.
