= Eleius =

Son of Poseidon and Eurycyda

In Greek mythology, the name Eleius (/ɛˈlaɪ.əs/; Ancient Greek: Ἠλεῖος) may refer to:

- Eleius, son of Poseidon and Eurycyda. When Aetolus, his maternal uncle, was sent into exile, Eleius became king of the Epeans (who had received their original name from his other uncle, Epeius) and renamed his people the Eleans after himself, and the land was accordingly named Elis. He had a son Augeas.
- Eleius, a descendant of the precedent (the lineage is as follows: Eleius I - Augeas - Agasthenes - Polyxenus - Amphimachus - Eleius II), and also king of Elis. It was during his reign that the Heraclidae assembled under the leadership of Aristomachus' sons to attempt to return to Peloponnesus.
- Eleius, son of Tantalus and another possible eponym of Elis.
