= Phorbas (son of Lapithes) =

In Greek mythology, Phorbas (/ˈfɔːrbəs/; Ancient Greek: Φόρβας, gen. Φόρβαντος, romanized: Phórbās, gen. Phórbantos, lit. 'giving pasture', 'feeding' or 'grazing') or Phorbaceus (/fɔːrˈbeɪˌʃ(j)uːs/) was a prince of the Thessalian Phlegyes who emigrated to Elis in the Peloponnesos.

== Family ==
Phorbas was the son of Lapithes and Orsinome, and a brother of Periphas.

== Mythology ==
Phorbas assisted Alector, king of Elis, in the war against Pelops, and shared the kingdom with him. He married Hyrmine, sister of Alector, and gave his daughter Diogeneia in marriage to Alector. His sons with Hyrmine were Augeas (Aegeus), Actor and Tiphys, all three were Argonauts.

Phorbas was said to have been a lover of Apollo.
