= Endymion (mythology) =

Ancient Greek mythical character

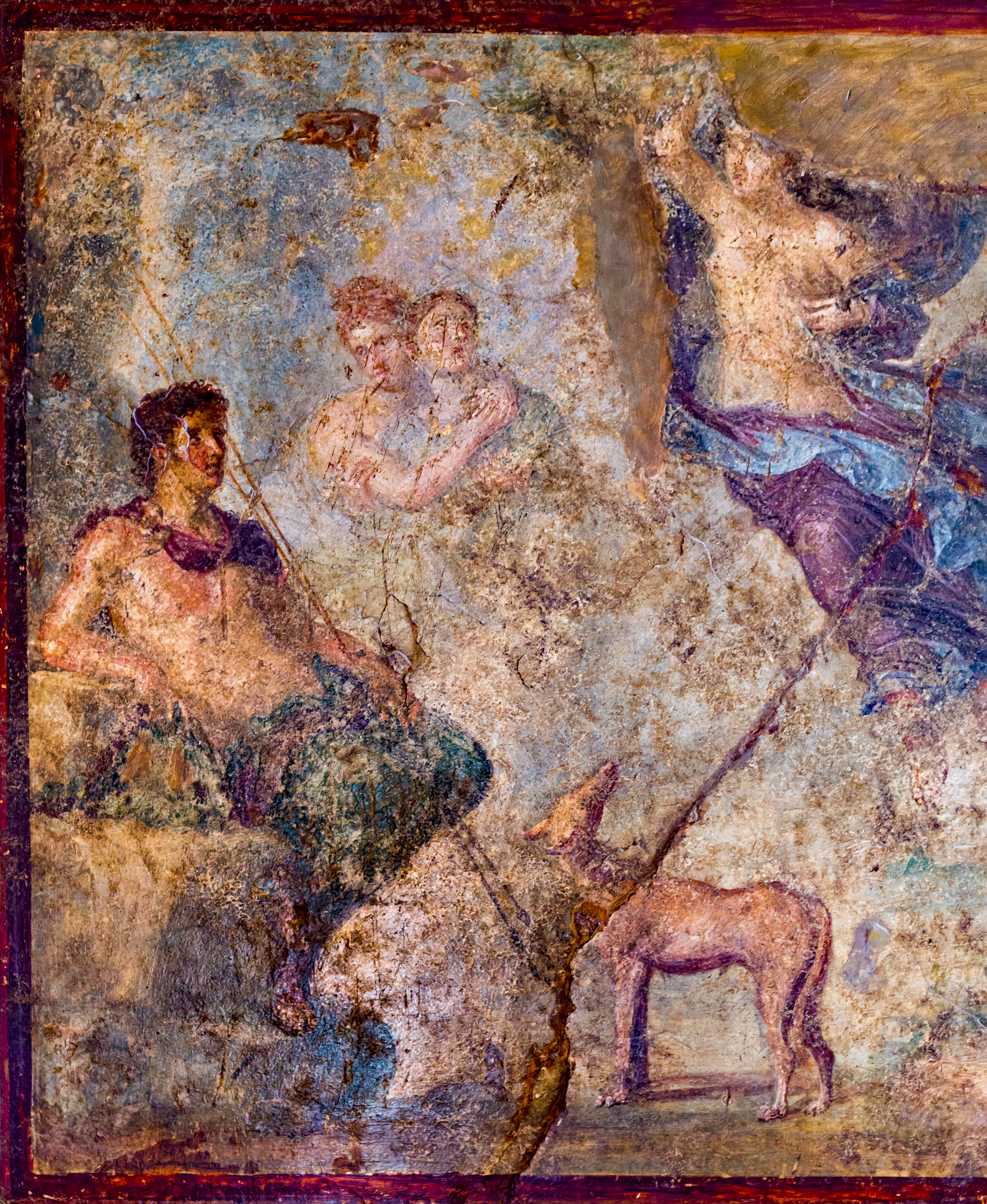
Endymion as hunter (with a dog), sitting on rocks in a landscape, holding two spears, looking at Selene who descends to him. Antique fresco from Pompeii.

In Greek mythology, Endymion (Note: Michael Drayton's spelling in Endimion and Phœbe (1597) did not catch on.) (/ɛnˈdɪmiən/; Ancient Greek: Ἐνδυμίων; gen.: Ἐνδυμίωνος) was variously a handsome Aeolian shepherd, hunter, or king who was said to rule and live at Olympia in Elis. He was also venerated and said to reside on Mount Latmus in Caria, on the west coast of Asia Minor.

There is confusion over Endymion's identity, as some sources suppose that he was, or was related to, the prince of Elis, and others suggest he was a shepherd from Caria. There is also a later suggestion that he was an astronomer: Pliny the Elder mentions Endymion as the first human to observe the movements of the moon, which (according to Pliny) accounts for Endymion's infatuation with its tutelary goddess. Consequently, Endymion's tomb has been attributed to two different sites. The people of Heracleia claimed that he was laid to rest on Mount Latmus, while the Eleans declared that it was at Olympia.

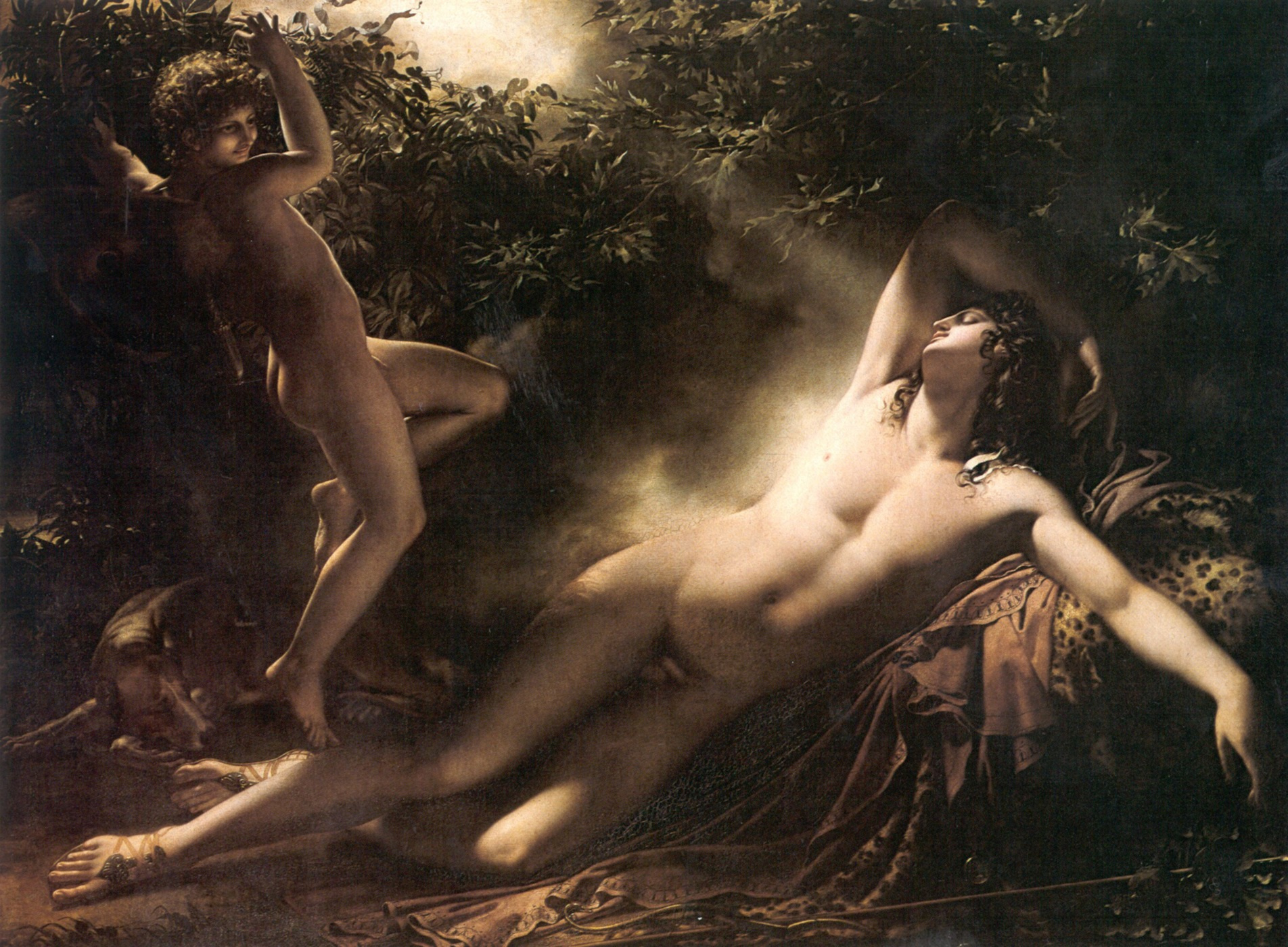
The Sleep of Endymion by Anne-Louis Girodet (1791), Musée du Louvre, Paris.

However, the role of lover of Selene, the Moon goddess, is attributed primarily to the Endymion who was either a shepherd or an astronomer, as either profession provides justification for the time he spent gazing at the Moon.

== Mythology ==
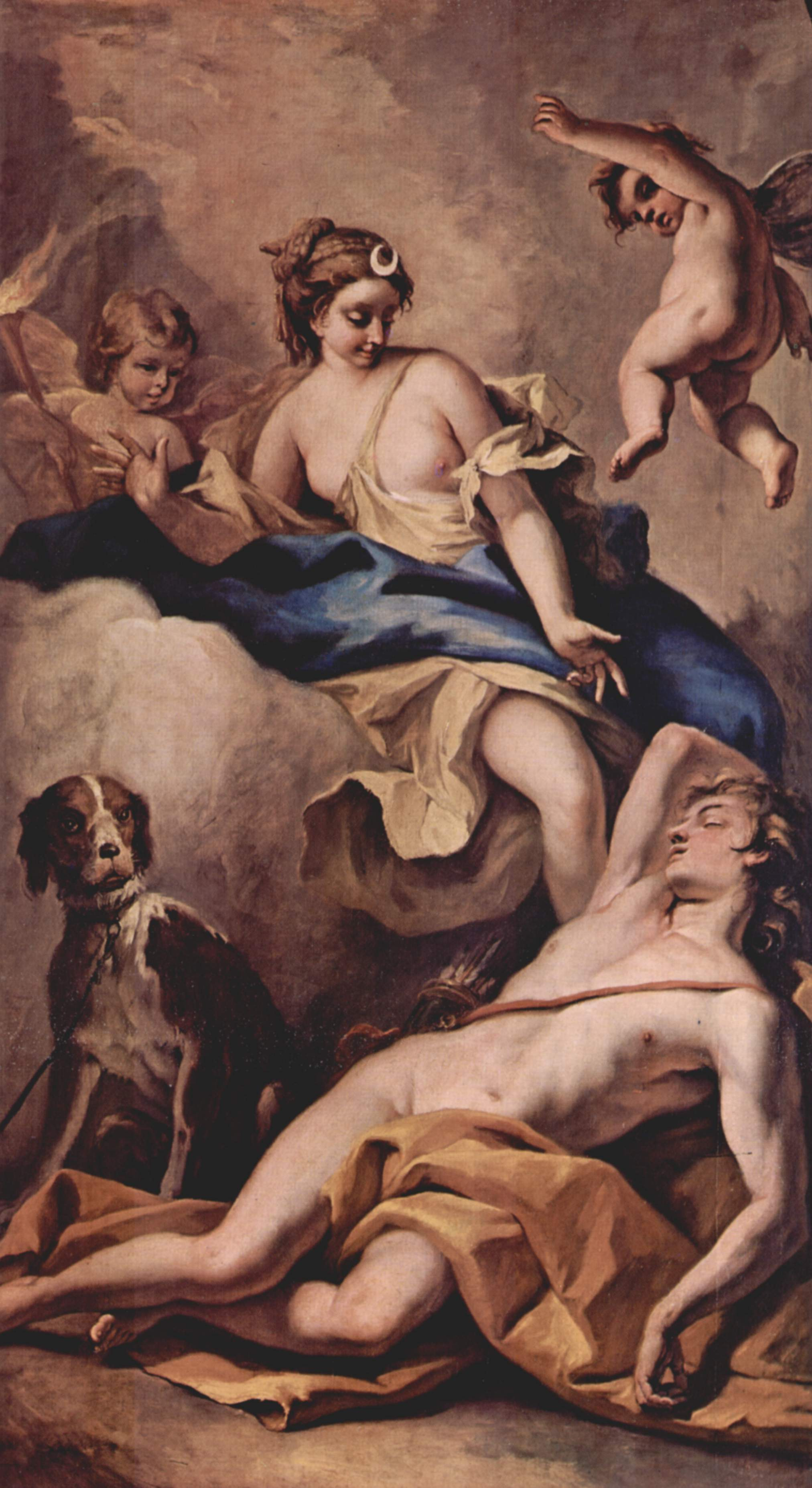
Selene and Endymion, by Sebastiano Ricci (1713), Chiswick House, England.

Apollonius of Rhodes (3rd century BC) is one of the many poets who tell how Selene, the Titan goddess of the Moon, (Note: Her Roman equivalent is Luna.) loved the mortal Endymion. She found Endymion so beautiful that she asked her cousin, Zeus, to grant him eternal youth so that he would never leave her. Alternatively, Selene so loved how Endymion looked when he was asleep in the cave on Mount Latmus, near Miletus in Caria, (Note: Sappho localises the myth at Mount Latmus.) that she entreated Zeus that he might remain that way. In some versions, Zeus wanted to punish Endymion for daring to show romantic interest in Hera (much like Ixion). Whatever the case, Zeus granted Selene's wish and put Endymion into an eternal sleep. Every night, Selene visited him where he slept, and by him had fifty daughters who are equated by some scholars (such as James George Frazer or H. J. Rose) with the fifty months of the Olympiad.

According to a passage in the Deipnosophistae, the sophist and dithyrambic poet Licymnius of Chios (probably 4th century BCE) told a different tale, in which Hypnos, the god of sleep, loves Endymion and does not close the eyes of his beloved even while he is asleep, but lulls him to rest with eyes wide open so that he may without interruption enjoy the pleasure of gazing at them.

The Bibliotheke claims that:

Calyce and Aethlius had a son Endymion who led Aeolians from Thessaly and founded Elis. But some say that he was a son of Zeus. As he was of unsurpassed beauty, the Moon fell in love with him, and Zeus allowed him to choose what he would, and he chose to sleep for ever, remaining deathless and ageless. Endymion had by a Naiad nymph or, as some say, by Iphianassa, a son Aetolus, who slew Apis, son of Phoroneus, and fled to the Curetian country. There he killed his hosts, Dorus and Laodocus and Polypoetes, the sons of Phthia and Apollo, and called the country Aetolia after himself.

In a similar vein, a scholiast on Apollonius Rhodius wrote that, according to Hesiod, Zeus allowed Endymion to be the keeper of his own death and to decide on his own when he would die.

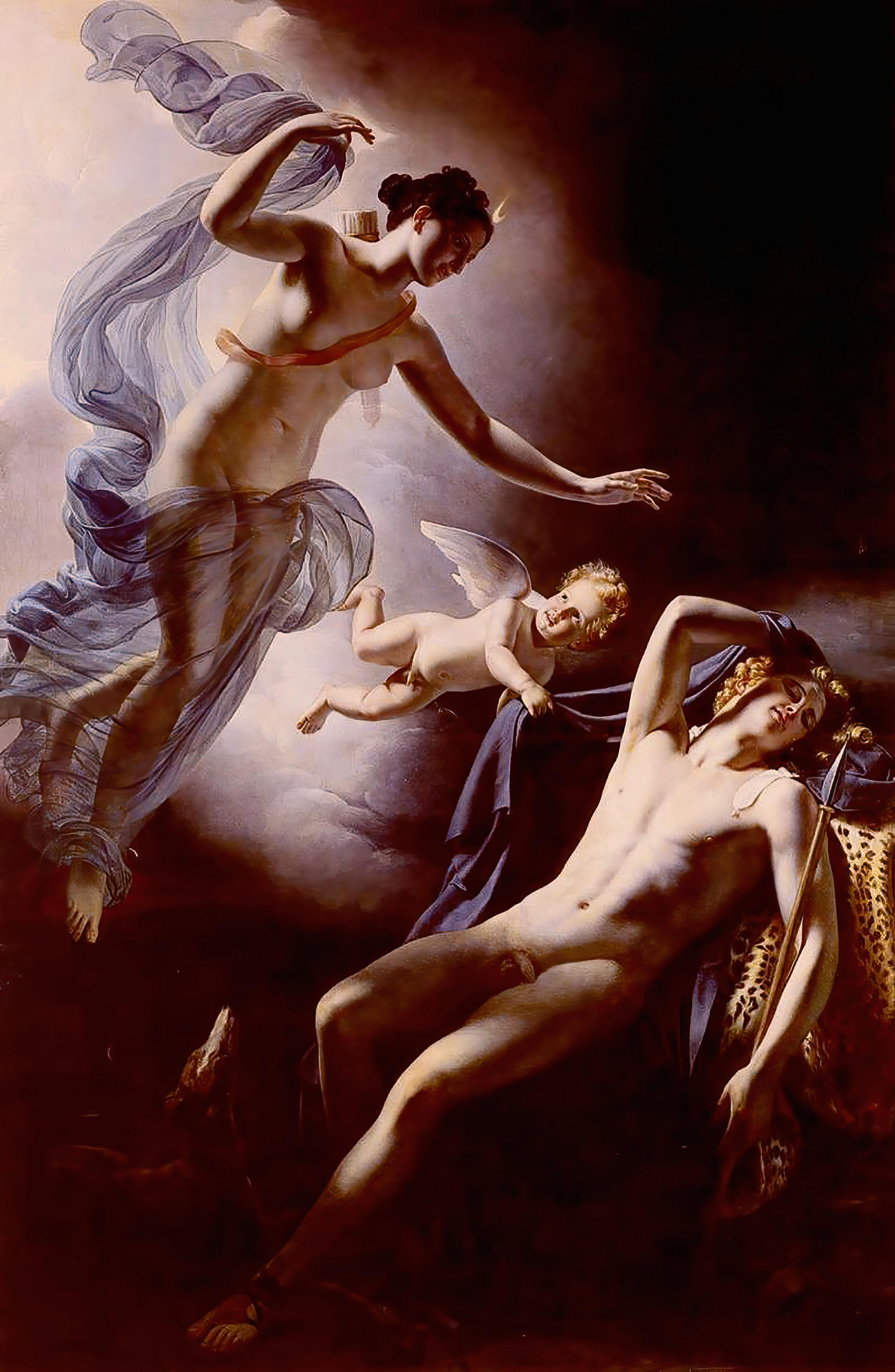
Diana and Endymion by Jérôme-Martin Langlois, c. 1822

According to Pausanias, Endymion deposed Clymenus, son of Cardys, at Olympia. Describing the "early history" of the Eleans, Pausanias reports that:

The first to rule in this land, they say, was Aethlius, who was the son of Zeus and of Protogeneia, the daughter of Deucalion, and the father of Endymion. The Moon, they say, fell in love with this Endymion and bore him fifty daughters. Others with greater probability say that Endymion took a wife Asterodia—others say she was Chromia, the daughter of Itonus, the son of Amphictyon; others again, Hyperippe, the daughter of Arcas—but all agree that Endymion begat Paeon, Epeius, Aetolus, and also a daughter Eurycyda. Endymion set his sons to run a race at Olympia for the throne; Epeius won, and obtained the kingdom, and his subjects were then named Epeans for the first time. Of his brothers they say that Aetolus remained at home, while Paeon, vexed at his defeat, went into the farthest exile possible, and that the region beyond the river Axius was named after him Paeonia. As to the death of Endymion, the people of Heracleia near Miletus do not agree with the Eleans for while the Eleans show a tomb of Endymion, the folk of Heracleia say that he retired to Mount Latmus and give him honor, there being a shrine of Endymion on Latmus.

Pausanias also reports seeing a statue of Endymion in the treasury of Metapontines at Olympia.

Propertius (Book 2, el. 15), Cicero's Tusculanae Quaestiones (Book 1), and Theocritus discuss the Endymion myth at some length, but reiterate the above to varying degrees. The myth surrounding Endymion has been expanded and reworked during the modern period by figures like Henry Wadsworth Longfellow and John Keats (in his 1818 narrative poem Endymion).

The satirical author Lucian of Samosata records an otherwise unattested myth where a fair girl named Myia becomes Selene's rival for Endymion's affections; the chatty girl would endlessly talk to him when he slept, waking him up. This annoyed Endymion, and enraged Selene, who transformed the girl into a fly. In memory of Endymion, the fly still begrudges all sleepers their rest.

According to Conon, Endymion was referred to as the son of Aethnos (a variant of Aethlius) and the father of Eurypyle and Aitolos. Meanwhile, Recognitiones recounted that he was the progeny of Zeus and Phoenissa, daughter of Alphionis (Alpheus) .

Comparative table of Endymion's family
Relation	Names	Sources							
Relation	Names	Hesiod	Conon	Apollodorus	Pausanias		Nonnus	Clement	Stephanus
Parents	Aethlius and Calyce	✓		✓					
Parents	Aethlius				✓				
Parents	Aethnos		✓						
Parents	Zeus			✓					
Parents	Zeus and Phoenissa							✓	
Wife	Naiad nymph			✓					
Wife	Iphianassa			✓					
Wife	Selene				✓		✓		
Wife	Asterodia					✓			
Wife	Cromia					✓			
Wife	Hyperippe					✓			
Children	Aetolus		✓	✓		✓			
Children	Eurypyle		✓						
Children	50 daughters				✓				
Children	Eurycyda					✓			
Children	Epeius					✓			
Children	Paeon					✓			
Children	Narcissus						✓		
Children	Naxos								✓

== Background ==
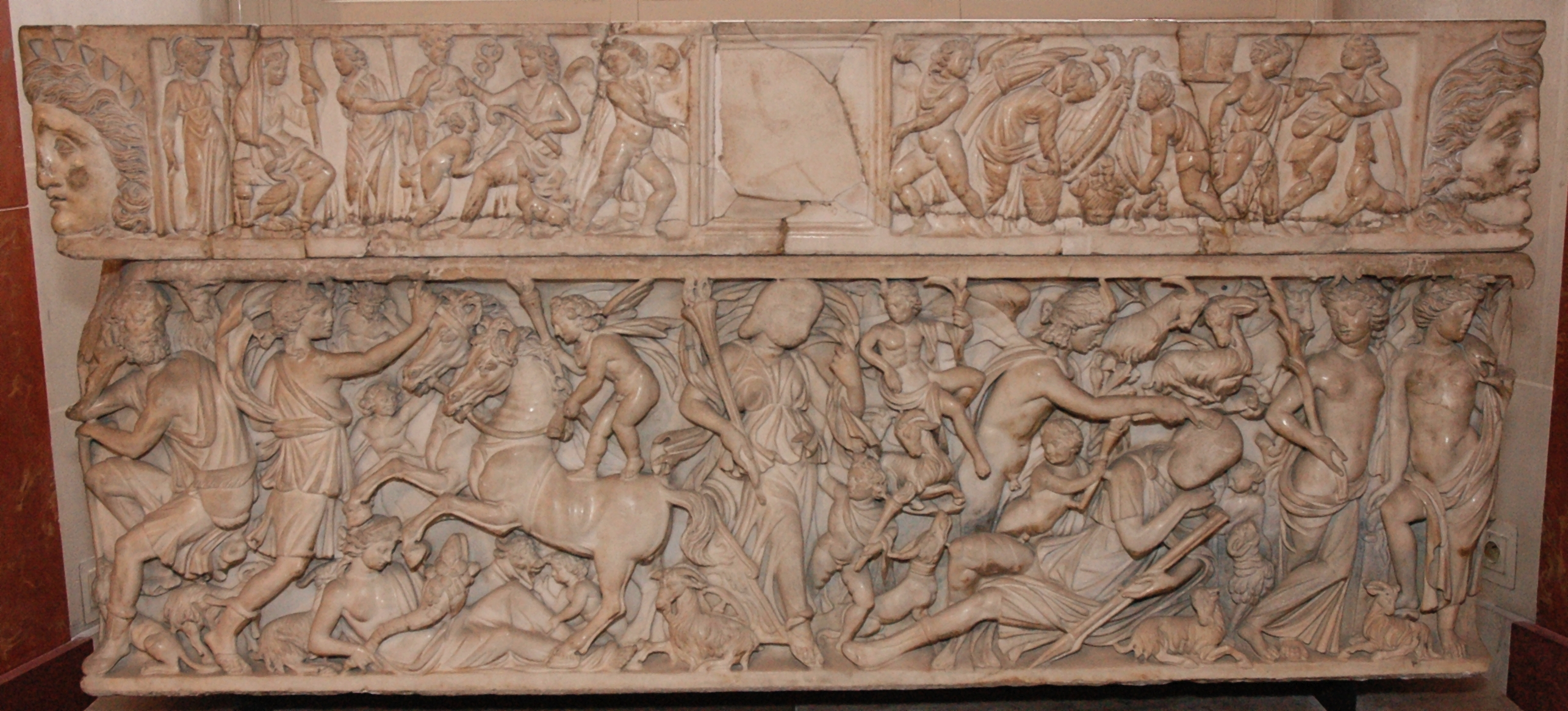
Gallo-Roman "Endymion" sarcophagus, early third century, kept in the Louvre.

No explicit narrative has survived. In the Argonautica (iv.57ff) the "daughter of Titan," the Moon, was witness to Medea's fearful night-time flight to Jason, and "rejoiced with malicious pleasure as she reflected to herself: 'I'm not the only one then to skulk off to the Latmian cave, nor is it only I that burn with desire for fair Endymion'" she muses. "But now you yourself it would seem, are a victim of a madness like mine." Lemprière's Classical Dictionary reinforces Pliny's account of Endymion's attachment to astronomy and cites it as the source of why Endymion was said to have a relationship with the moon as she passed by.

The mytheme of Endymion being not dead but endlessly asleep, which was proverbial (the proverb—Endymionis somnum dormire, "to sleep the sleep of Endymion") ensured that scenes of Endymion and Selene were popular subjects for sculpted sarcophagi in Late Antiquity, when after-death existence began to be a heightened concern. The Louvre example, discovered at Saint-Médard-d'Eyrans, France (illustration above), is one of this class.

Some believe that he was the personification of sleep, or the sunset (most likely the last one as his name, if it were Greek rather than Carian can be construed from "to dive in" [Greek en (ἐν) in, and duein (δύειν) dive], which would imply a representation of that sort. Latin writers explained the name from somnum ei inductum, the "sleep put upon him".)

The myth of Endymion was never easily transferred to ever-chaste Artemis, the Olympian associated with the Moon. In the Renaissance, the revived moon goddess Diana had the Endymion myth attached to her.

== Gallery ==
Endymion in art

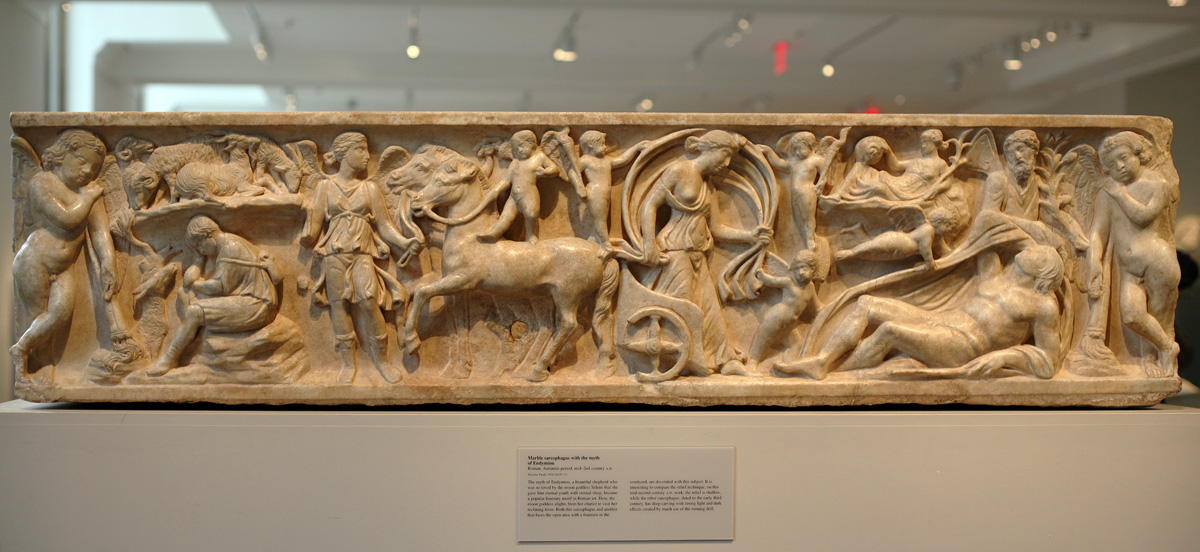
A Roman Endymion sarcophagus, mid-2nd century AD. (Metropolitan Museum of Art)

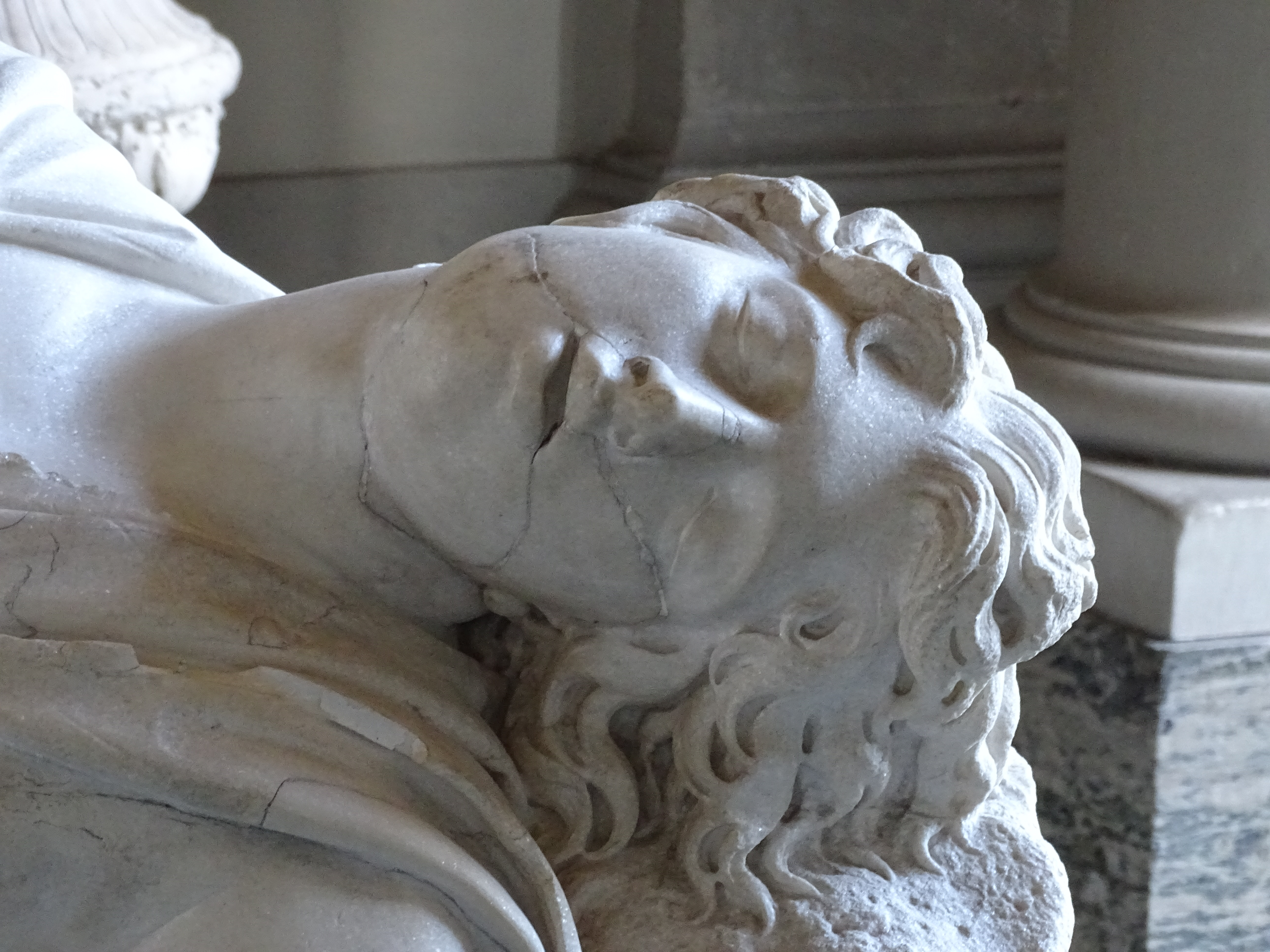
Roman "Endymion" statue, reign of Hadrian - early 2nd century (Gustav III's Antikmuseum, Stockholm)

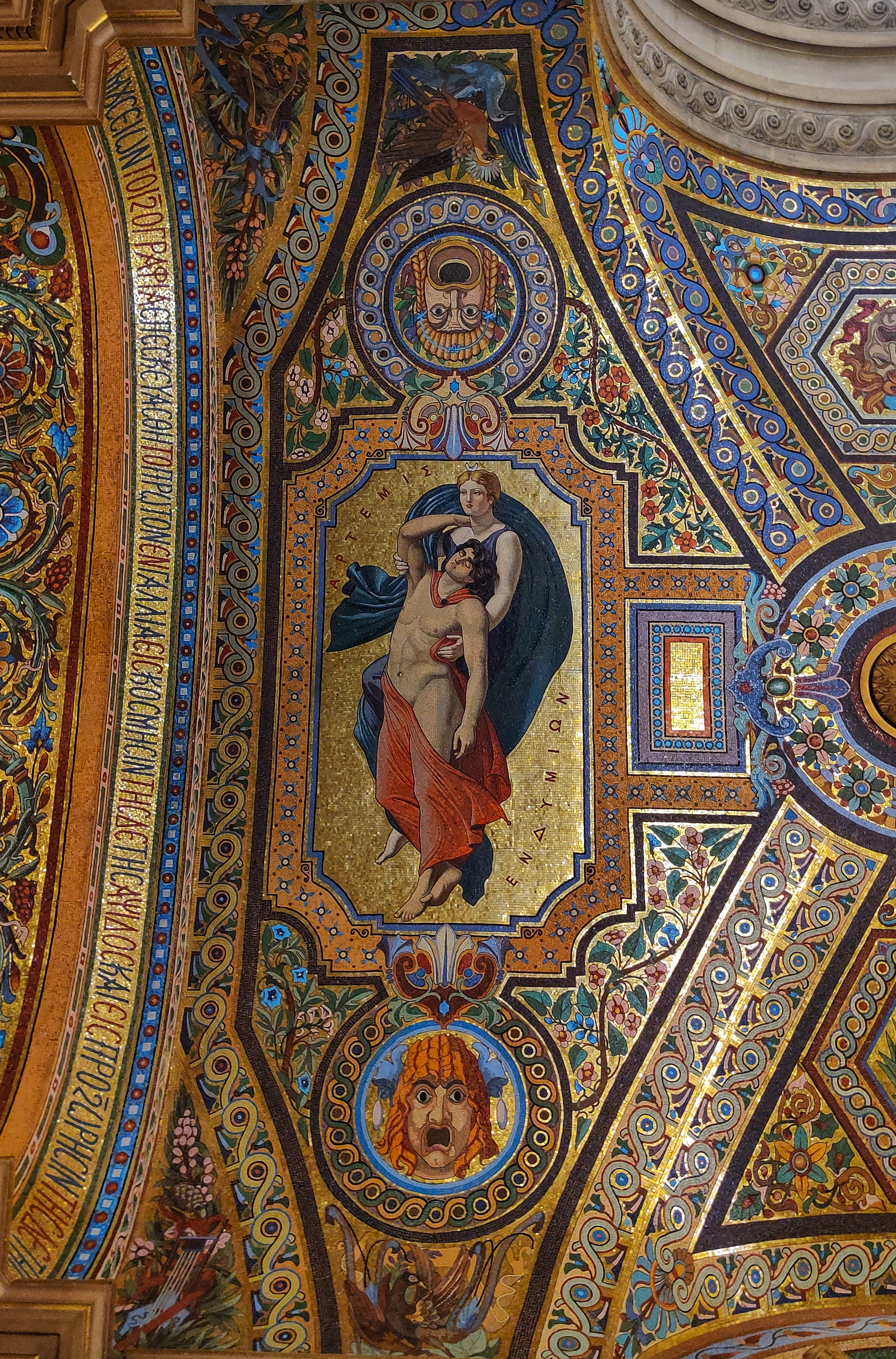
Artemis and Endymion in Palais Garnier, Paris
