= Paeon (son of Endymion) =

Paeon or Paion (Ancient Greek: Παίων, gen.: Παίονος), in Greek mythology, was an Elean prince as son of King Endymion, and brother of Epeius, Aetolus, Eurycyda and possibly Naxos. From him, the ancient region of Paeonia—on the Axius river, in the northern parts of the modern region of Macedonia—and the tribe of the Paeonians, were believed to have derived their name.

Map of Paeon

According to mythology, Endymion had his sons compete in a footrace at Olympia for the right to succeed him as king. Epeius emerged victorious and inherited the kingdom. Paeon, angered by his defeat, withdrew into a distant exile, and the land beyond the River Axius that he settled became known as Paeonia after him.

== See also ==
- Paeonian language
