= Thrasymedes (son of Nestor) =

Prince of Pylos in Greek mythology

In Greek mythology, Thrasymedes (/ˌθræsɪˈmiːdiz/; Ancient Greek: Θρασυμήδης means 'bold of thought') was a prince of Pylos and a participant in the Trojan War.

== Family ==
Thrasymedes was the oldest son of King Nestor and Eurydice (or Anaxibia) and the elder brother of Antilochus. His other siblings were Peisistratus, Pisidice, Polycaste, Perseus, Stratichus, Aretus, Echephron, and Antilochus.

== Mythology ==
=== Iliad ===
Thrasymedes was one of the more prominent younger leaders portrayed in the Iliad, though not to the extent of his brother. He fought bravely throughout the entire war. In the Iliad he was one of the lead sentries and was present at night when the Greek wall was built. When Diomedes and Odysseus went on a spying expedition he gave the former his armour and sword before they left. When his brother was killed by Memnon he helped his father fight for possession of the dead body, but due to Memnon's superior strength they were forced to withdraw and enlist the help of Achilles. Once he whipped Odysseus, mistaking him for a beggar after the latter stole the Luck of Troy. He was also one of the Danaans to enter the Trojan Horse.

Thrasymedes survived the war and returned home with his father, presumably inheriting his kingdom when his father died. However he is said to have fought for many years against invaders who sacked Pylos in the 12th century BC—the ancestors of the Spartans—and this was just the beginning of the centuries long struggle between Messene and Sparta.

=== Odyssey ===
In the Odyssey, Telemachus visited him at Pylus whilst searching for news on his lost father Odysseus.

== In modern culture ==
In the 1960s, the Greek archaeologist Spyridon Marinatos excavated a Bronze Age tholos tomb overlooking Voidokilia beach, which he fancifully named the "Tomb of Thrasymedes".

== See also ==
- Voidokilia beach
