= Paeon (son of Antilochus) =

In Greek mythology, Paeon or Paion (Ancient Greek: Παίων, gen.: Παίονος) was the son of Antilochus, and a lord of Messenia. Antilochus was one of the suitors of Helen, who together with his father Nestor, the king of Pylos, and brother Thrasymedes, fought in the Trojan War. According to the second-century geographer Pausanias, Paeon's sons were among the descendants of Neleus (the Neleidae) expelled from Messenia, by the descendants of Heracles, as part of the legendary "Return of the Heracleidae", later associated with the supposed "Dorian invasion". According to Pausanias, the sons of Paeon, along with other of the expelled Neleidae, Alcmaeon and Melanthus fled to Athens, and it was from this Paeon that the Attic clan and deme of Paeonidae or Paionidai were supposed to have derived its name. The deme was apparently the same as the Paeonia, which Herodotus located as being below the Attic fortress of Leipsydrium.
