= Pleisthenes (son of Atreus) =

Pleisthenes (Ancient Greek: Πλεισθένης, lit. 'most strength', 'greatest vigor' or 'most powerful'), in Greek mythology, was the son of Atreus and Aerope. According to Hesiod, Pleisthenes married Cleolla, daughter of Dias, and became the father of Agamemnon, Menelaus, and Anaxibia. Aeschylus also followed this tradition when he called the Atreidai "the race of Pleisthenes" (τὸ Πλεισθένους γένος).

== Mythology ==
According to Hyginus, Pleisthenes was raised by Atreus's brother Thyestes, accompanied Thyestes into exile, and was sent by Thyestes to kill Atreus. Not realizing that he was the young man's father, Atreus killed Pleisthenes.

Agamemnon and Menelaus are commonly considered the sons of Atreus; hence they are often given the name Atreidai, or "the sons of Atreus". One explanation for this discrepancy is that, after the early death of Pleisthenes, Atreus raised his grandsons, the sons of Pleisthenes, as his own sons.

John Tzetzes reports that in the Hesiodic Catalogue of Women Pleisthenes was either a hermaphrodite or a transvestite.
