= Paeonidae =

Ancient Athenian deme

Coordinates: 38°07′23″N 23°43′38″E

Paeonidae or Paionidai (Ancient Greek: Παιονίδαι), was a deme of ancient Attica, associated with the tribe (phyle) Leontis. It was apparently the same as the Paeonia or Paionia (Παιονίη), which Herodotus located as being below the Attic fortress of Leipsydrium. The site of Paeonidae is located north of modern Acharnes (formerly Menidi) at the foot of Mount Parnes.

According to the second-century geographer Pausanias, the Paeonidae were supposed to have been named after Paeon, the son of Antilochus, who was the son of Nestor, and one of the suitors of Helen, who fought in the Trojan War.

== Bibliography ==
- Åhlfeldt, Johan, Digital Atlas of the Roman Empire, Lund University.
- Grimal, Pierre, The Dictionary of Classical Mythology, Wiley-Blackwell, 1996, ISBN 978-0-631-20102-1.
- Herodotus; Histories, A. D. Godley (translator), Cambridge, Massachusetts: Harvard University Press, 1920; ISBN 0674991338. Online version at the Perseus Digital Library.
- Humphreys, S. C., Kinship in Ancient Athens: An Anthropological Analysis, Oxford University Press, 2018. ISBN 9780191092398.
- Larcher, Pierre-Henri, Larcher's notes on Herodotus: Historical and critical comments on the history of Herodotus, with a chronological table, Volume 2, Whittaker, 1844.
- Pausanias, Description of Greece. W. H. S. Jones (translator). Loeb Classical Library. Cambridge, MA: Harvard University Press; London, William Heinemann Ltd. (1918). Vol. 1. Books I–II: ISBN 0-674-99104-4.
- Smith, William (1854), Dictionary of Greek and Roman Geography, London. Online version at the Perseus Digital Library
- Smith, William (1873), Dictionary of Greek and Roman Biography and Mythology, London. Online version at the Perseus Digital Library
- Talbert, Richard ed. (2000). Barrington Atlas of the Greek and Roman World. Princeton University Press.
