= Ablerus (mythology) =

In Greek mythology, a Trojan soldier killed by Antilochus

In Greek mythology, Ablerus (Ancient Greek: Ἄβληρος) was a Trojan soldier killed by Antilochus, son of Nestor with his lance during the Trojan War. Homer's Iliad briefly describes the killing of Ablerus at the hands of 'Nestor's Son', Antilochus, however there isn't much historical documentation of this figure from Greek mythology outside of this.
