= Spyridon Marinatos =

Greek archaeologist (1901–1974)

- Σπυρίδων Μαρινάτος
- Marinatos at Akrotiri in 1968
- Born: Spyridon Nikolaou Marinatos; 17 November [O.S. 4 November] 1901; Lixouri, Kephallonia, Greece
- Died: 1 October 1974 (aged 72); Akrotiri, Thera, Greece
- Resting place: Akrotiri
- Known for: Excavations of Akrotiri; theory of the volcanic destruction of Minoan Crete
- Children: Nanno
- Honours: Order of the Phoenix (Commander); Order of George I (Knight); Legion of Honour (Officer); Order of Merit of the Italian Republic

Academic background
- Education: University of Athens; Friedrich Wilhelms University of Berlin; University of Halle
- Thesis: Ἤ ἀρχαία θαλασσογραφία (Ancient Marine Art) (1925)
- Doctoral advisor: Georgios Oikomenos

Academic work
- Discipline: Archaeology
- Sub-discipline: Archaeology of the Aegean Bronze Age
- Institutions: Greek Archaeological Service; University of Athens
- Notable students: Stylianos Alexiou; Evi Touloupa

Signature
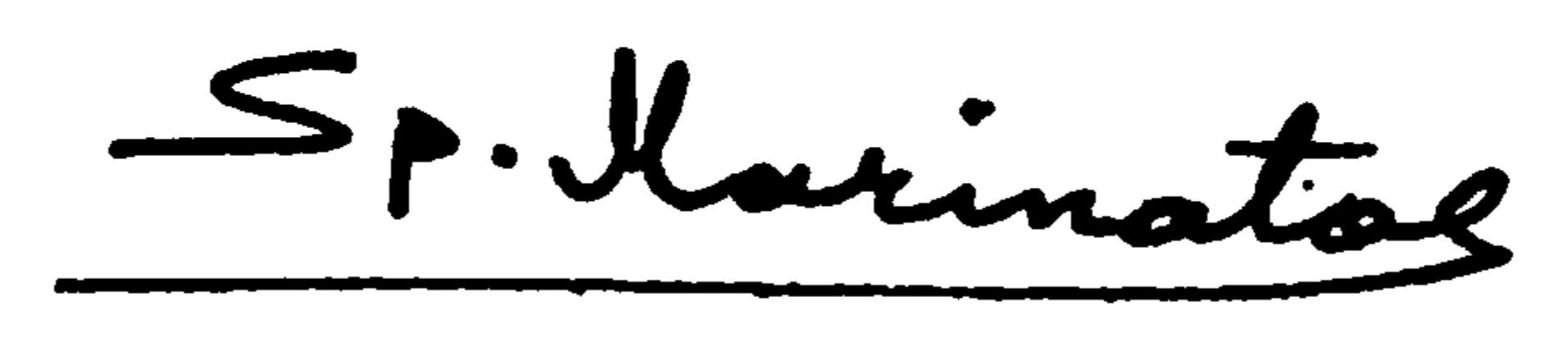

Spyridon Marinatos (Greek: Σπυρίδων Μαρινάτος; 17 November [O.S. 4 November] 1901 (Note: Greece adopted the Gregorian calendar in 1923; 28 February [O.S. 15 February] was followed by 1 March. In this article, this date and all subsequent dates are given in the "New Style" Gregorian calendar, while dates before it are given in the "Old Style" Julian calendar.) – 1 October 1974) was a Greek archaeologist who specialised in the Minoan and Mycenaean civilizations of the Aegean Bronze Age. He is best known for the excavation of the Minoan site of Akrotiri on Thera, (Note: Generally known as Santorini in modern times.) which he conducted between 1967 and 1974. He received many honours in Greece and abroad, and was considered one of the most important Greek archaeologists of his day.

A native of Kephallonia, Marinatos was educated at the University of Athens, the Friedrich Wilhelms University of Berlin, and the University of Halle. His early teachers included noted archaeologists such as Panagiotis Kavvadias, Christos Tsountas and Georg Karo. He joined the Greek Archaeological Service in 1919, and spent much of his early career on the island of Crete, where he excavated several Minoan sites, served as director of the Heraklion Museum, and formulated his theory that the collapse of Neopalatial Minoan society had been the result of the eruption of the volcanic island of Thera around 1600 BCE.

In the 1940s and 1950s, Marinatos surveyed and excavated widely in the region of Messenia in south-west Greece, collaborating with Carl Blegen, who was engaged in the simultaneous excavation of the Palace of Nestor at Pylos. He also discovered the battlefield of Thermopylae and excavated the Mycenaean cemeteries at Tsepi and Vranas near Marathon in Attica.

Marinatos was head of the Greek Archaeological Service from 1937 to 1939, from 1955 to 1958, and lastly from 1967 to 1974, under the Greek military junta. He was an enthusiastic supporter of the junta; in the late 1930s, he had been close to the quasi-fascist dictatorship of Ioannis Metaxas, under whom he initiated legislation to restrict the roles of women in Greek archaeology. His leadership of the Archaeological Service has been criticised for its cronyism and for promoting the pursuit of grand discoveries at the expense of good scholarship. Marinatos died while excavating at Akrotiri in 1974, and is buried at the site.

== Life ==
=== Early career and education ===
Spyridon Marinatos was born in Lixouri on the Ionian island of Kephallonia on 17 November [O.S. 4 November] 1901. His father, Nikolaos, was a carpenter. (Note: Palyvou 2014; Alexiou 1975, p. 174 (for Lixouri).) Marinatos studied at the University of Athens from 1916, where he competed unsuccessfully with Christos Karouzos for a scholarship, beginning a lifelong rivalry between the two. Marinatos joined the Greek Archaeological Service in 1919 and was first posted to Crete as an epimelitis (junior archaeological official). His early excavations on Crete included the Minoan villa at Amnisos, and he continued to excavate on the island periodically between 1919 and 1952.

Marinatos was one of the first thirty-six students of the "Practical School of Art History", an archaeological training centre established by the Archaeological Society of Athens at the request of the Greek government, studying there in the 1919–1920 academic year. The school's instructors included noted archaeologists and folklorists such as Panagiotis Kavvadias, Christos Tsountas, Konstantinos Kourouniotis, Antonios Keramopoulos and Nikolaos Politis, (Note: Petrakos 1995, pp. 120–121. Petrakos gives the school's name in Greek, as Πρακτικῆς Σχολῆς τῆς ἱστορίας τῆς τέχνης.) while his fellow students included Karouzos and Semni Papaspyridi, later Karouzos's wife. Between 1921 and 1925, Marinatos completed military service in the Hellenic Army. He received his doctorate in 1925, with a dissertation supervised by the archaeologist Georgios Oikonomos on the depiction of marine animals in Minoan art. (Note: Iakovidis 1975, p. 635; Marinatos 1930, p. 108 (for Oikomenos). Iakovidis gives the date as 1921, but Marinatos gave it as 1925 in a 1930 republication of his dissertation's first chapter. The dissertation is Marinatos 1925.)

In June 1926, Marinatos met the British archaeologist Arthur Evans at the site of the Minoan palace at Knossos, which Evans had been excavating since 1900: both had travelled to the site to assess the damage of an earthquake. Evans would become an influence on his theories of contact between Minoan Crete and ancient Egypt, and on his study of natural disasters in prehistory. (Note: Marinatos 2015a, pp. 13, 21; Gere 2009, p. 76 (for Evans's dates).) Marinatos and Evans quarrelled in 1928–1929, when he challenged Evans over a trial excavation that the latter had initiated at Knossos without a permit, but Marinatos subsequently became Evans's long-term friend and intellectual supporter. In 1930, inspired by Evans, he gave a lecture in which he argued that the destruction of the site of Knossos had been caused by an earthquake. Other sites Marinatos excavated on Crete included Messara, Sklavokampos, the Geometric temple at Dreros, Tylissos and Eileithyia Cave.

As was common practice for Greek archaeologists at the time, Marinatos studied in Germany; he attended the Friedrich Wilhelms University of Berlin and the University of Halle. He arrived at Berlin in 1927, where his teachers included the philologist Ulrich von Wilamowitz-Moellendorff and the archaeologist Gerhart Rodenwaldt. He attended Halle on a scholarship, which he won in 1928 while serving as deputy to Stefanos Xanthoudidis, the senior ephor (archaeological inspector) of eastern Crete. At Halle, he studied under Georg Karo, who had excavated at the Mycenaean site of Tiryns and was working on the publication of the finds from Heinrich Schliemann's excavations at Mycenae. Xanthoudidis died suddenly in 1929; Marinatos returned early from Halle to succeed him, (Note: In the interim, the post was briefly occupied by P. Stavropoulos.) and was appointed as senior ephor of eastern Crete in March 1929. (Note: Tsipopoulou 2010, p. 346; Petrakos 2015, p. 20. Thompson gives the date of his promotion as 1925; Iakovidis gives it as 1921.) He served as director of the Heraklion Museum from 1929 until 1937. He considered his monthly salary of 3,500 drachmas inadequate, and told a Cretan newspaper that he was considering leaving archaeology over it.

During his time on Crete, Marinatos was credited with thwarting the efforts of local goldsmiths to produce and sell forged antiquities, often commissioned by antiquities traders. (Note: Karo 1959, pp. 41–42, quoted in MacGillivray 2000, p. 284.) He also successfully prosecuted Nikolaos Pollakis, a Cretan priest, in 1931 for illegal antiquities trading. He excavated at Arkalochori Cave in central Crete in 1934–1935, assisted by the epimelitis Nikolaos Platon, where he uncovered the Arkalochori Axe. Between 1934 and 1935, Marinatos excavated a Mycenaean cemetery on his native island of Kephallonia, where he discovered two chamber tombs. The project was funded by Johanna Goekoop, the widow of the Dutch businessman and amateur archaeologist Adriaan Goekoop, who had funded excavations by Marinatos's former teacher Kavvadias on the island in 1899.

=== First directorship of the Archaeological Service ===
Marinatos served as Director General of Antiquities and Historic Monuments, the head of the Greek Archaeological Service, from 1937 until 1939, succeeding Georgios Oikonomos, who moved to the more prestigious office of Director General of Antiquities, Letters and Arts. Shortly after his promotion, Marinatos left Crete to become a professor at the University of Athens, where he introduced the first teaching of Near Eastern archaeology. (Note: Palyvou 2014; Vitaliano 1971, p. 67; Iakovidis 1975, p. 636 (for Marinatos's departure from Crete).) His students at Athens included the archaeologists Spyros Iakovidis, Stylianos Alexiou and Evi Touloupa. (Note: Marinatos 2014, p. 161 (for Iakovidis and Alexiou); Rovatsou 2015 (for Touloupa).)

In 1939, Marinatos undertook a lecture tour of the United States. His former teacher Karo, who had fled there from antisemitic persecution in Germany, asked Marinatos to forward on his behalf a series of postcards from Greece to various addresses in Nazi-occupied Europe. Unsure of Karo's intentions, Marinatos gave the letters to his benefactor Elizabeth Humlin Hunt, in whose home he had been staying, to dispose of: she handed them to the Federal Bureau of Investigation. This began a chain of allegations against Karo which, while ultimately dismissed as unproven, saw him labelled an "enemy alien" and denied US citizenship. When a joint excavation between the University of Cincinnati, represented by Carl Blegen, and the Greek Archaeological Service under Kourouniotis discovered in 1939 the remains of the Mycenaean palace at Pylos, Marinatos played an important role in facilitating the purchase of the site and in popularising its identification as the "Palace of Nestor".

In May 1939, funded and assisted by Elizabeth Humlin Hunt, Marinatos discovered and excavated the battlefield of Thermopylae, the site of the last stand of the Spartans against the Persian Empire in 480 BCE. His excavation was widely reported in the Greek and foreign press, and played an important ideological role for the nationalist government of Ioannis Metaxas. (Note: See § Politics below. The historian Susan Heuck Allen describes the excavation as "propaganda fodder" for Metaxas.) In the same year, Marinatos published an article in the journal Antiquity arguing that the Neopalatial civilisation of Crete had been destroyed by the eruption of the volcanic island of Thera, based on his discovery at Amnisos of a large quantity of volcanic pumice that had been worn away by water, which he took as evidence of tsunamis similar to those that followed the 1883 eruption of Krakatoa. (Note: Palyvou 2014; Vitaliano 1971, p. 67; Iakovidis 1975, p. 636 (for Marinatos's departure from Crete).) Marinatos decided to excavate on Thera to test his hypothesis, (Note: Higgins 1973, p. 305; Thompson 1975, p. 59: Marinatos's article is Marinatos 1939.) though the initially muted scholarly reaction to his ideas led him to reconsider his intention to begin this work in 1939, and it was further delayed by the Second World War. (Note: Christos Doumas lays part of the blame for this reaction on the outbreak of the Second World War: most of the copies of the 1939 edition of Antiquity were destroyed in the bombing of London before entering circulation.) Later, in 1950, he suggested that the story of Atlantis may derive from an oral tradition of myths concerning the eruption of Thera.

=== Second World War and aftermath ===
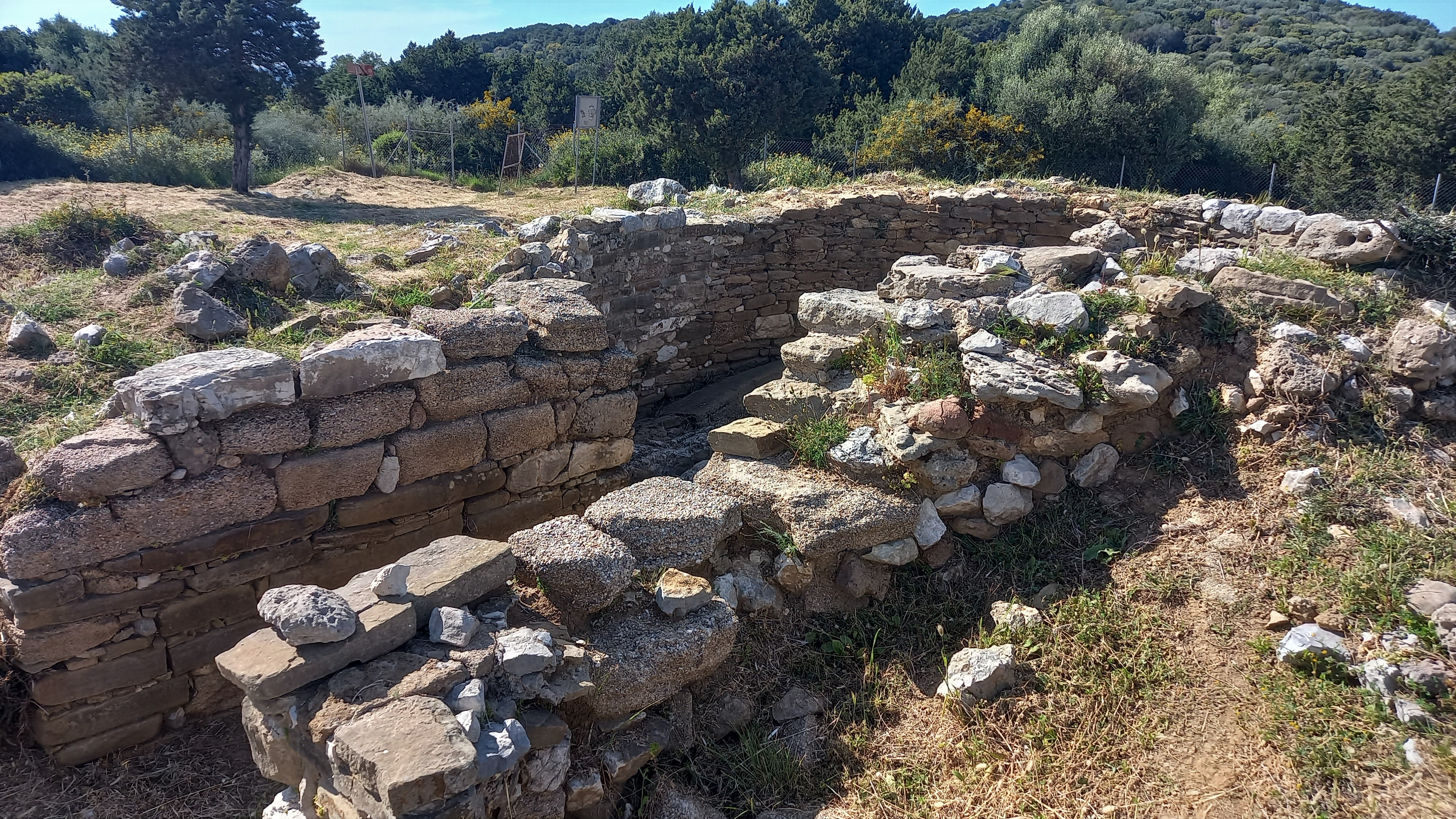
The tholos tomb at Voidokilia in Messenia, dubbed the "Tomb of Thrasymedes" by Marinatos

During the winter of 1940–1941, at which time Greece was under invasion from Italy, Marinatos collaborated with the British archaeologist Alan Wace to study the façade of the Treasury of Atreus, a late Bronze Age tholos tomb at Mycenae. In 1945, he replaced Kourouniotis, who had died the same year, as the Greek representative in the excavations at Pylos. Blegen offered to collaborate with Marinatos on the excavation of the palace, but Marinatos opted instead to excavated sites in the wider area of Messenia, with the aim of finding hitherto-undiscovered Mycenaean cemeteries and settlements. His method of consulting local farmers and hunters about the location of surface finds allowed him to discover sites previously unknown to archaeology.

Marinatos travelled to Italy, Germany and Austria on 1 May 1948, with the military rank of tagmatarchis (major), to recover Greek antiquities looted during the Second World War. The trip lasted seventy-five days and was often frustrated by the non-cooperation of archaeologists, officials and soldiers from other Allied powers, but Marinatos succeeded in recovering the Aphrodite of Rhodes as well as objects looted from Knossos by the Nazi general Julius Ringel. In 1949–1951, he returned to Crete, excavating at Vathypetro. In December 1951, he was made a member of an archaeological committee to oversee John Papadimitriou's excavation of Grave Circle B at Mycenae: the committee also included George E. Mylonas, Antonios Keramopoulos and the ephor Seraphim Charitonidis, who had discovered the site earlier that year. Marinatos returned to Messenia in 1952, representing the Archaeological Society of Athens, when he uncovered a wealthy cemetery at Volimidia, around 5 kilometres (3.1 mi) to the north-east of the Palace of Nestor: he described this discovery as "very encouraging" and considered the tombs to belong to Homeric Pylos, ruled by the mythical Nestor. (Note: Spencer 2023, p. 35; Vlachopoulos 2021, p. 232 (for the Homeric connection).) He excavated a total of thirty-one tombs at Volimidia in 1952–1954, 1960 and 1964–1965.

Between 1956 and 1957, Marinatos excavated the second, unplundered, tholos tomb at Routsi. Between 1960 and 1965, Marinatos excavated the tholos tombs at Peristeria. Other sites he excavated in Messenia included Mouriatada, Katarrhaki and Palaiohoria – all in the area of Koukounara – Voroulia and the tholos at Voidokilia known as the "Tomb of Thrasymedes". In total, he produced thirty-five publications on the subject of Mycenaean Messenia. Working in Messenia until 1966, he discovered more than twenty archaeological sites, including a monumental building with frescoes at Iklaina, a burial tumulus at Papoulia, and the tholos tomb at Charakopeio. He built a house in Volimidia in the 1960s, which he owned until his death.

Marinatos briefly returned as director of the Archaeological Service in 1955, but was forced to resign in 1958 by the Prime Minister, Konstantinos Karamanlis, (Note: The archaeological historian Vasileios Petrakos judges that his term was "a time of poverty ... and nothing important happened".) and was succeeded by John Papadimitriou. In late July 1960, he resigned from Greece's Archaeological Council, which advised the Greek government on archaeological matters, in protest at the transfer of the Archaeological Service from the Ministry of Education to the Ministry of the Presidency, which was seen as a move to align it more closely with the state's tourism policy and grant Papadimitriou greater autonomy. He served as rector of the University of Athens in 1958–1959, (Note: Thompson 1975, p. 59. Papadopoulos states that he was rector in 1947.) remaining as a professor there until 1968.

=== Regime of the Colonels, Akrotiri and death ===
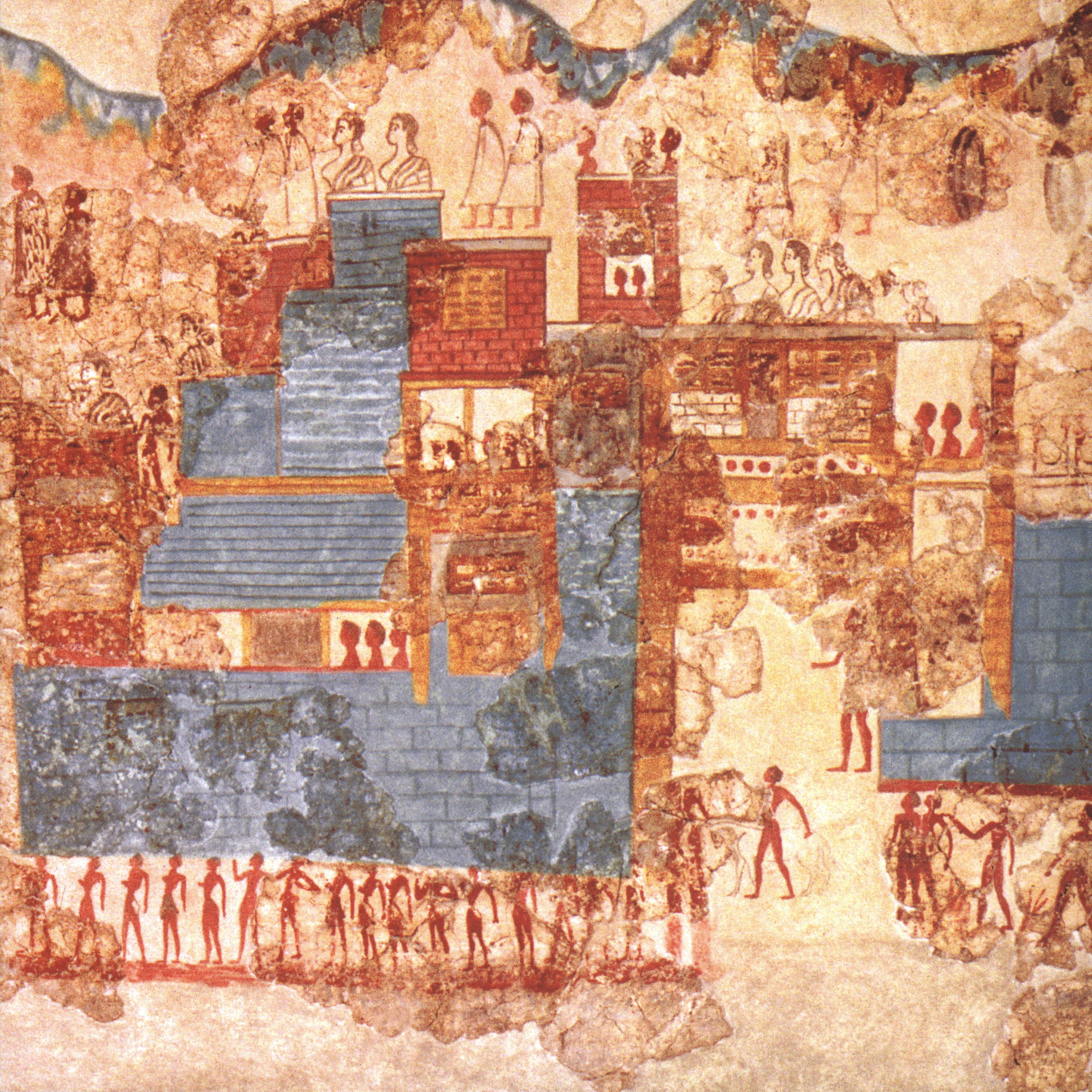
Fresco showing a Minoan town, from the "West House" at Akrotiri, excavated by Marinatos in 1971–1972

Recalled to head the Archaeological Service by the recently installed military junta in 1967, Marinatos established an archaeological journal, the Athens Annals of Archaeology, and was credited with facilitating the resumption of the American excavations in the Athenian Agora in 1969. He discovered the Mycenaean cemetery of Tsepi, near Marathon, excavating it personally between November 1969 and October 1970, and frequently returning to visit and direct the excavations over the succeeding years. At Vranas, near Tsepi, he excavated four prehistoric tumuli in 1970 on behalf of the Archaeological Society of Athens, (Note: Gofa, Philippa-Touchais & Papadimitriou 2020, p. 437; Bennet 2016, p. 21. Marinatos published the preliminary results of this excavation as Marinatos 1970.) and partially excavated a nearby classical tumulus known as the "Tumulus of the Plataeans". Marinatos believed that this was the burial mound of the soldiers of Plataea who died during the Battle of Marathon in 490 BCE, but his identification has generally been considered unsound. (Note: Prevedorou 2015, p. 129. For the doubts raised that the mound is truly that of the Plataeans, see Snodgrass 1983, p. 152; Petrakos 1996, pp. 67–68; and Duffy 2018, pp. 60–61.)

Marinatos's most notable excavation was the site of Akrotiri, a Minoan settlement on the island of Thera whose existence had first been established in 1867. His decision to investigate the site followed Platon's excavations of Zakros on Crete, which began in 1961 and uncovered pumice: Platon announced in the Greek press that this discovery was proof of Marinatos's theory of the volcanic destruction of Minoan civilisation. (Note: Marinatos 2015a, p. 26; Platon 2012, p. 510 (for the date of Platon's excavation).) Marinatos visited Thera in 1962 and 1963, and began excavations in 1967. He circumvented the difficulty of excavating the remains, which were buried beneath approximately 150 feet (46 metres) of pumice, by tunnelling into the site from a gully that cut through it. The excavations were funded partly by the Archaeological Society of Athens, from whom Marinatos secured 60,000 drachmas (then equivalent to $2,000, or to approximately $19,000 in 2025), and partly by the naval engineer James W. Mavor, who collaborated on the excavation for its first year and supplied $2,000, which he had received as an advance for his collaboration on a book about Atlantis.

Within five days of the excavation's start on 24 May, Marinatos uncovered remains of a structure in the Minoan architectural style, as well as pottery of Cretan origin. He was called back to Athens on official business and to begin the purchase of the land, and only able to return on 21 June, a week before the first season was due to conclude. The excavation was supported by forty local pumice miners, and uncovered the first traces of frescoes, over a total of six days of work across the season. Between 1971 and 1972, he excavated a structure he called the "West House"; the frescoes found there were called "one of the most important monuments of Aegean art yet found" by the archaeologist Peter Warren in 1979. By 1974, the excavated area totalled approximately one hectare (10,000 square metres).

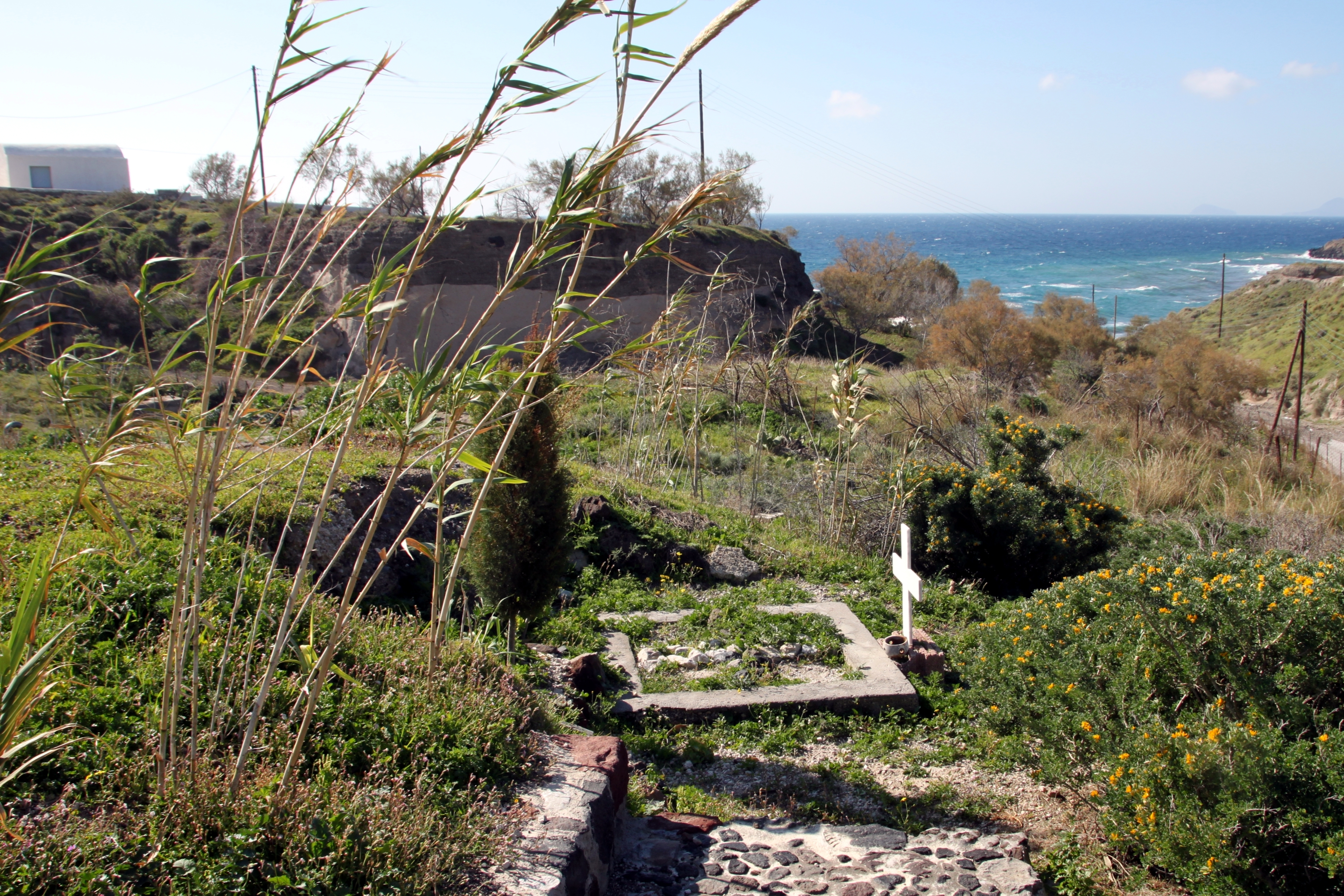
Marinatos's grave at Akrotiri

Marinatos was removed from the leadership of the Archaeological Service on 31 January 1974. (Note: Kokkinidou & Nikolaidou 2006, p. 176; The New York Times, 3 October 1974; The New York Times, 1 February 1974.) No official reason was given for the dismissal, though the general Dimitrios Ioannidis, who had taken power in a coup of November 1973, considered him a potentially subversive "liberal".

On 1 October 1974, Marinatos died while excavating at Akrotiri. Contemporary accounts related that he had died from a fall, while giving instructions to a worker; a later narrative emerged that he had been struck by a collapsing wall. (Note: See, for example: McCrum 2005; Raphael 2019, p. 40.) At the time of his death, most of his excavations were not fully published. He was initially buried on the excavation site, near the place of his death; his grave was subsequently moved outside the ruins. Marinatos's deputy Christos Doumas, who had worked with him at Akrotiri since 1968, took over the site and published the first full report of its excavation in 1983.

== Politics ==
Marinatos held strong right-wing and Greek nationalist views. (Note: On nationalism, see Hamilakis 2007, pp. 198–199.) In the late 1920s, he supported the foreign policy of Eleftherios Venizelos, a broadly liberal politician who had brought Greece into the First World War on the side of the Entente. In a letter of 1928, he described his fellow Greek archaeologists as "Bolsheviks or social reformers of no international recognition"; (Note: Quoted in Kokkinidou & Nikolaidou 2006, p. 167.) in 1949, he visited the concentration camp of Makronisos, used to imprison communists during the Greek Civil War, and wrote that there was "no finer school" in Greece. The archaeological historian Andreas Vlachopoulos has judged that Marinatos's politics rarely influenced his work, but that he made "nationalist exaggerations in favour of the Greek race" during his excavations around Marathon. During the quasi-fascist dictatorship of Ioannis Metaxas, which began in August 1936, Marinatos and the Athenian intellectual establishment enjoyed official support: Metaxas had previously visited Marinatos at archaeological excavations, and attended a lecture by him on 13 March 1940. Marinatos was invited by the Nazi government of Germany to speak at the Sixth International Conference of Classical Archaeology, held in Berlin between 21 and 26 August 1939, as a representative of the Metaxas administration. The archaeological historian Georgia Flouda has described the conference as "a propaganda venue" for German archaeology. In the late 1960s, Marinatos served on a fundraising committee to raise a monument to Metaxas in Argostoli on Kephallonia.

In 1939, Marinatos initiated legislation which banned women from joining the Archaeological Service or serving as the directors of museums and regional ephorates, as part of a broader scheme of misogynistic legislation promoted by the Metaxas government. In a public address of 28 October 1941, commemorating Metaxas's defiance of the Italian dictator Benito Mussolini the previous year, Marinatos praised both Metaxas, who had died that January, and the exiled King George II, who had made Metaxas prime minister after his own restoration in a military coup led by Georgios Kondylis. (Note: Kokkinidou & Nikolaidou 2006, p. 167; Petrakos 2015, p. 35. For the relationship between George, Metaxas and Kondylis, see Koliopoulos & Veremis 2010, p. 103.) Despite the ongoing Axis occupation of Greece, his comments were broadcast on national radio and garnered a strong reaction from the Greek public: the historian and communist Yanis Kordatos denounced Marinatos in Rizospastis, the official newspaper of the Communist Party of Greece, and Karouzos and Ioannis Miliadis wrote to the collaborationist prime minister, Konstantinos Logothetopoulos, criticising Marinatos's conduct. (Note: Petrakos 2015, pp. 35–36. For Kordatos's politics, see Mishkova 2022, p. 130. For Rizospastis, see Mazower 2016, p. 72.)

When the military junta known as the Regime of the Colonels seized power in 1967, they dismissed the director of the Archaeological Service, Ioannis Kontis, considering him politically unreliable. Marinatos, described in a modern study as "utterly devoted" to the regime, was immediately reappointed to replace him, under the title of "Inspector General of the Services of Archaeology and Restoration". According to Doumas, Marinatos's support was an important factor in the legitimisation of the junta's rule. Marinatos promoted his own supporters and oversaw the sacking of many Greek archaeologists, making particular efforts to remove his political opponents, women – particularly Semni Karouzou, who was forced into exile in Italy and Germany – and adherents of progressive, non-traditional methodology. (Note: Marinatos used the label "New Archaeology" for such methods, but with little relation to its usual reference to what is now called processual archaeology.) According to his daughter Nanno, he became disillusioned with politics in the last year of his life, particularly following the Turkish invasion of Cyprus in July 1974, and wrote in a letter that he was "a citizen of Minos and live[d] in 1500 BCE".

== Assessment, legacy and honours ==
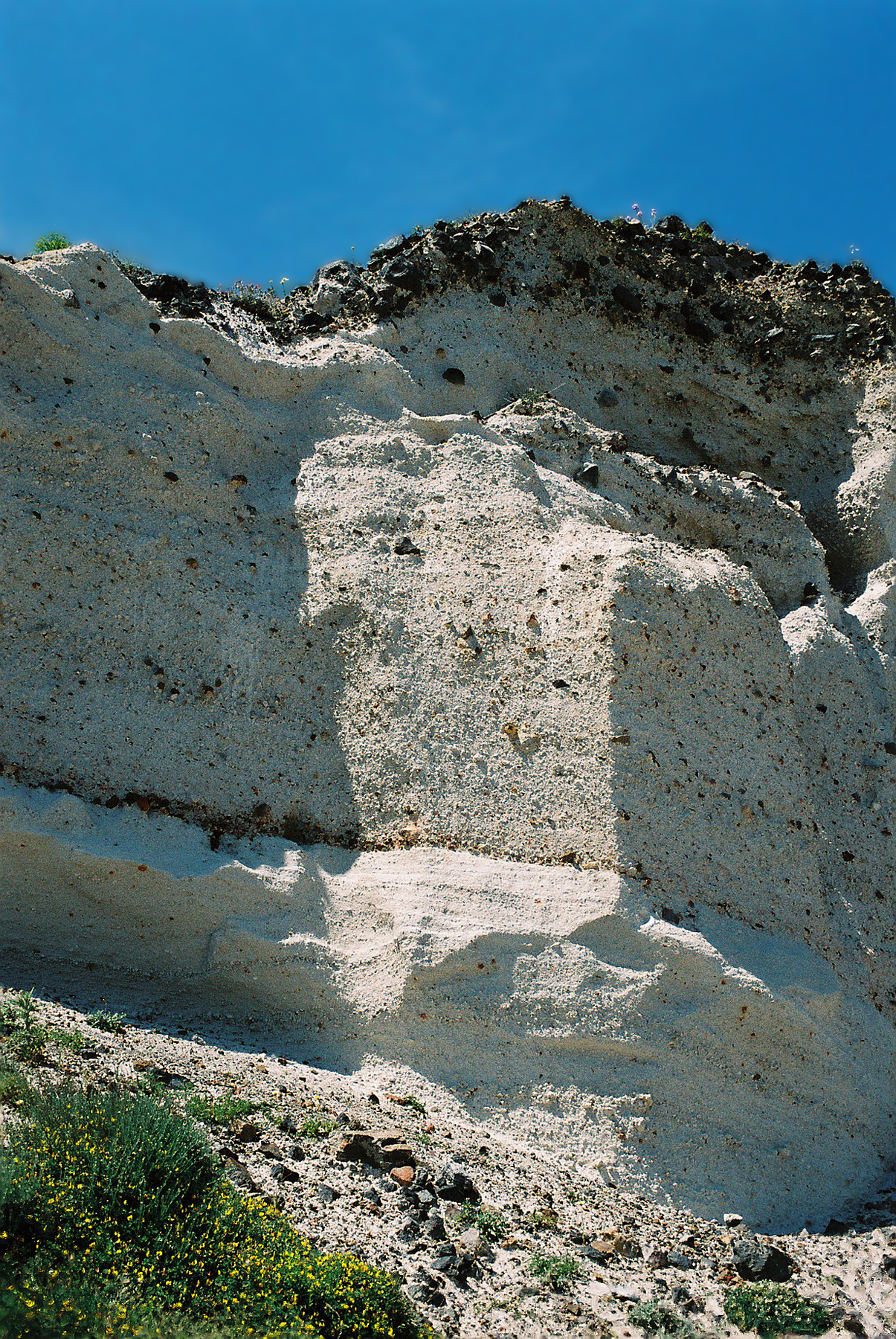
Layers of pumice at Akrotiri, remnants of the volcanic eruption Marinatos believed responsible for the end of Neopalatial Minoan civilisation

Until 1974, Marinatos and his followers were considered a dominant force in the Greek archaeological establishment. An Athens newspaper reported his death with the headline "the oak tree of archaeology has fallen". In 2021, the archaeologist Jack Davis called Marinatos one of the great figures of Greek archaeology. He was listed in 2015 as "belong[ing] to a special archaeological generation that renewed Greek archaeology" by the archaeological historian Vasileios Petrakos.

The excavation of Akrotiri was recognised within Marinatos's lifetime as his greatest contribution to scholarship. (Note: See e.g. Thompson 1975, p. 59.) Shortly before Marinatos's death, the British archaeologist Reynold Higgins noted that the excavations at Akrotiri had been called "the most important classical excavation since Pompeii"; they were covered by media from Europe, the United States, Australia, Iran, Japan, and China, and prompted a special edition of National Geographic magazine in 1978. The site is known as one of the best-preserved settlements from the ancient world, and is particularly important in the study of Minoan art, especially wall-painting.

Several of Marinatos's archaeological hypotheses were controversial in his time and have since been rejected. The editors of Antiquity appended a postscript to his 1939 publication about the Thera eruption, stating that they believed the evidence currently insufficient to support Marinatos's hypothesis that the eruption had destroyed Minoan civilisation. Contemporary excavators on Crete found little supporting evidence for it, and it attracted few adherents until Platon's work at Zakros in the early 1960s. In the later part of the twentieth century, more detailed analysis of the pottery from Crete and Akrotiri indicated that the eruption occurred several generations before the end of Neopalatial civilisation, which is now generally attributed to human causes. The story of Atlantis is generally considered to be an "invented myth" by the Athenian philosopher Plato, rather than a genuine oral tradition, and most modern scholars consider the attempt to link archaeological finds to the characters and places of the Homeric poems, as Marinatos did for Pylos, Volimidia and Voidokilia, to be fundamentally misguided.

Marinatos's leadership has been characterised as promoting himself and the pursuit of impressive finds at the expense of scholarship. During his third period as the head of the Archaeological Service, he was criticised for his abolition of the rigorous examination process by which new ephors were selected, and his approach to recruiting and promoting colleagues has been described as driven by cronyism and political manoeuvring. His colleague at the University of Athens, Nikolaos Kontoleon, wrote that Marinatos's administration "constituted an unprecedented attempt to curtail the scholarly activity of Greek archaeologists ... [and] exercised oppression [which] dismembered a whole service". (Note: Quoted in Kokkinidou & Nikolaidou 2006, p. 179.) According to the archaeological historians Dimitra Kokkinidou and Mariana Nikolaidou, his management had "a disastrous impact on future developments", as his methods and priorities were adopted by his successors after the return to democracy in 1974.

Marinatos was made a member of the Academy of Athens, Greece's national academy, in 1955, and was its president at the time of his death. He was elected a member of the American Philosophical Society in 1966. He was also a doctor honoris causa of the University of Palermo, as well as an honorary member of the Archaeological Institute of America, of the German Archaeological Institute and of the Austrian Archaeological Institute. He held a visiting membership at the Institute for Advanced Study in Princeton, New Jersey, as well as memberships of the British Society for the Promotion of Hellenic Studies, and the Spanish Pastor Foundation for Classical Studies. He was a corresponding member of the Austrian Academy of Sciences, the Heidelberg Academy of Sciences and Humanities, the Royal Flemish Academy of Belgium for Science and the Arts, the Académie Française and the British Academy. He was made a commander of the Order of the Phoenix, a knight of the Order of George I, and in 1938 an officer of the French Legion of Honour. He was also awarded the Order of Merit of the Italian Republic, Italy's most senior honour. After Marinatos's death, a bronze bust of him was erected in the garden of the Archaeological Museum of Chora, which holds many finds from his excavations in Messenia; one of the town's major streets is also named after him.

== Personal life and character ==
Marinatos generally excavated in a pith helmet. His house, which he used as a classroom during the German occupation of Athens of 1941–1944, was designed in the style of Minoan architecture. He had interests in medicine, astronomy, botany and biology, which informed his archaeological work. The archaeologist Emily Vermeule, who excavated with Marinatos at Akrotiri, called him a "crack revolver shot, diplomat, astronomer, linguist, and portly wit". His former student Stylianos Alexiou later recalled listening to Marinatos play classical music on the violin. He may also have written a novel.

Marinatos was known to be strong-willed and sometimes stern. His former student, the archaeologist Yannos Lolos, described him as "an archaeologist in the grand tradition", "an austere and imposing figure" and as a gifted speaker, "restless and indefatigable as an excavator". Marinatos's colleague Ioannis Miliadis, however, wrote in 1937 that he had "good intentions, up to the point that they [were] confronted with his personal interests". (Note: Quoted in Kokkinidou & Nikolaidou 2006, p. 167.) During his quarrel with Evans in the late 1920s, archaeologists of the British School at Athens, particularly John Pendlebury, accused Marinatos of being "German-minded" and of anti-British prejudice, a claim that Nanno Marinatos has condemned as unfounded.

Between 1925 and June 1974, Marinatos maintained a scrapbook of his appearances in the academic and popular press, which eventually grew to around four hundred pages. He cultivated relationships with newspaper editors, such as Miltiadis Paraskevaïdis and Athina Kalogeropoulou (also an archaeologist): he frequently invited Paraskevaïdis to his home at 47 Polyla Street in Athens to give him interviews and photographs for publication. (Note: Vlachopoulos 2014, p. 340. For Kalogeropoulou's archaeology, see Younger 2002, p. 190.) He maintained a particular association with the newspapers Elefthero Vima and Kathimerini, publishing articles in the former between 1928 and 1961 and in the latter from the 1950s until its closure in 1967.

Marinatos maintained a long-running collaboration with the conservator Zacharias Kanakis, who worked with him on excavations between 1934 and 1970. Marinatos was married twice, to Maria Evangelidou in 1927 and, at the time of his death, to Aimilia Loverdos. (Note: Marinatos 2015c, p. 196 (Evangelidou; Vlachopoulos 2014, p. 346 for the date); The New York Times, 3 October 1974 (Loverdos): for Loverdos's first name, Journal of Ancient Egyptian Interconnections 2015, pp. 1–2.) His daughter by Loverdos, Nanno Marinatos, is also a scholar of Minoan culture.

== Published works ==
- Marinatos, Spyridon (1925). Ἤ ἀρχαία θαλασσογραφία [Ancient Marine Art] (PhD thesis) (in Greek). University of Athens.
- — (1928). "Stephanos Xanthudidis". Gnomon (in German). 4 (11–12): 706–708. ISSN 0017-1417. JSTOR 27673920.
- — (1930). Αἰ θαλασσογραφικαὶ παραστάσεις τῆς Κρητομυκηναϊκῆς ἐποχῆς [The Seascapes of the Creto-Mycenaean Period] (PDF). Αρχαιολογική Εφημερίς [Archaeological Journal] (in Greek): 108–126. ISSN 1105-0950.
- — (1939). "The Volcanic Destruction of Minoan Crete". Antiquity. 13 (52): 425–439. doi:10.1017/S0003598X00028088. ISSN 0003-598X. S2CID 161365405.
- — (1940). "Forschungen in Thermopylae" [Excavations at Thermopylae]. Archäeologisches Institut des deutschen Reiches: Bericht über den VI. internationalen Kongress für Archäologie, Berlin, 21.–26. August 1939 [Archaeological Institute of the German Reich: Report on the Sixth International Congress for Archaeology, Berlin, 21–26 August 1939] (in German). Berlin: Walter de Gruyter & Co. pp. 333–341. doi:10.1515/9783111670423. OCLC 2980339.
- — (1950). Περί τον θρύλον της Ατλαντίδος [On the Myth of Atlantis]. Κρητικά Χρονικά [Cretan Chronicles] (in Greek). 4: 195–213. ISSN 0454-5206.
- — (1952). Ανασκαφαί εν Πύλῳ [Excavations at Pylos] (PDF). Πρακτικά της εν Αθήναις Αρχαιολογικής Εταιρείας [Proceedings of the Archaeological Society of Athens] (in Greek). 107: 473–496. ISSN 1105-0969.
- — (1953). Ανασκαφαί εν Πύλῳ [Excavations at Pylos] (PDF). Πρακτικά της εν Αθήναις Αρχαιολογικής Εταιρείας [Proceedings of the Archaeological Society of Athens] (in Greek). 108: 238–250. ISSN 1105-0969.
- — (1954). Ανασκαφαί εν Πύλῳ [Excavations at Pylos] (PDF). Πρακτικά της εν Αθήναις Αρχαιολογικής Εταιρείας [Proceedings of the Archaeological Society of Athens] (in Greek). 109: 299–316. ISSN 1105-0969.
- — (1954). "Der 'Nestorbecher' aus dem iv. Schachtgrab von Mykene" [The "Cup of Nestor" from Shaft Grave IV at Mycenae]. In Lullies, Reinhard (ed.). Neue Beiträge zur Klassischen Altertumswissenschaft: Festschrift zum 60. Geburtstag von Bernhard Schweitzer [New Contributions to the Study of Classical Antiquity: Festschrift on the 60th Birthday of Bernhard Schweitzer] (in German). Stuttgart and Cologne: W. Kohlhammer. pp. 11–18. OCLC 2788126.
- — (1959). Kreta, Thera und das mykenische Hellas [Crete, Thera and Mycenaean Greece] (in German). Munich: Hirmer. OCLC 850788544.
- — (1960). Crete and Mycenae. Translated by Boardman, John. Photographs by Max Hirmer. London: Thames and Hudson. OCLC 510217.
- — (1960). Ανασκαφαί Πύλου [Excavations of Pylos] (PDF). Πρακτικά της εν Αθήναις Αρχαιολογικής Εταιρείας [Proceedings of the Archaeological Society of Athens] (in Greek). 116: 195–209. ISSN 1105-0969.
- — (1960). Ανασκαφαί Πύλου (1952–1960) [Excavations at Pylos (1952–1960)]. Αρχαιολογικόν Δελτίον [Archaeological Bulletin] (in Greek). 16: 112–119. ISSN 0570-622X.
- — (1961). "Verlust einer Handschrift in Messenien" [Loss of a Manuscript in Messenia]. Gnomon (in German). 33 (2): 223. ISSN 0017-1417. JSTOR 27682516.
- — (1964). Ανασκαφαί Πύλου [Excavations of Pylos] (PDF). Πρακτικά της εν Αθήναις Αρχαιολογικής Εταιρείας [Proceedings of the Archaeological Society of Athens] (in Greek). 120: 78–95. ISSN 1105-0969.
- — (1965). Ανασκαφαί εν Πύλῳ [Excavations at Pylos] (PDF). Πρακτικά της εν Αθήναις Αρχαιολογικής Εταιρείας [Proceedings of the Archaeological Society of Athens] (in Greek). 121: 102–120. ISSN 1105-0969.
- — (1968). Excavations at Thera: First Preliminary Report: 1967 Season. Athens: Publisher unknown. OCLC 889118999.
- — (1970). Ανασκαφαί Μαραθώνος: Πλάσι, Τσέπι, Βρανά [Excavations at Marathon: Plasi, Tsepi, Brana] (PDF). Πρακτικά της εν Αθήναις Αρχαιολογικής Εταιρείας [Proceedings of the Archaeological Society of Athens] (in Greek). 125: 5–18. ISSN 1105-0969.
- — (1972). Life and Art in Prehistoric Thera. Proceedings of the British Academy. Vol. 57. London: Oxford University Press. ISBN 0-19-725673-2.
- — (1974). "Das Schiffsfresko von Akrotiri" [The Ship-Fresco from Akrotiri]. Seewesen [Maritime Affairs]. By Gray, Dorothea (in German). Göttingen: Vandenhoeck & Ruprecht. pp. 141–165. ISBN 3-525-25406-7.
- — (1999). Excavations at Thera I–III: 1967–1969 Seasons (PDF) (2nd ed.). Athens: Archaeological Society of Athens. ISBN 960-7036-80-8.
- — (1999). Excavations at Thera IV–V: 1970–1971 Seasons (PDF) (2nd ed.). Athens: Archaeological Society of Athens. ISBN 960-7036-81-6.
- — (1999). Excavations at Thera VI–VII: 1972–1973 Seasons (PDF) (2nd ed.). Athens: Archaeological Society of Athens. ISBN 960-7036-82-4.

== Works cited ==
- Alexiou, Stylianos (1975). "Spyridon Marinatos, 1901–1974". Kadmos. 14 (2): 174–175. doi:10.1515/kadmos-1975-0213. ISSN 1613-0723. S2CID 201807226.
- Alexiou, Stylianos (2015). Μνῆμες ἀπὸ τὴ δράση καὶ τὸ ἔργο τοῦ Σπυρίδωνος Μαρινάτου [Memories of the Deeds and Work of Spyridon Marinatos] (PDF). Mentor. 114: 3–15.
- Allen, Susan Heuck (2011). Classical Spies: American Archaeologists with the OSS in World War II Greece. Ann Arbor: University of Michigan Press. ISBN 978-0-472-03539-7.
- Bennet, John (2016). "The Work of the British School at Athens". Archaeological Reports. 62: 7–22. doi:10.1017/S057060841600003X. ISSN 0570-6084. JSTOR 44362665.
- Broodbank, Cyprian (2015) [2013]. The Making of the Middle Sea. London: Thames and Hudson. ISBN 978-0-19-999978-1.
- Davis, Jack L. (2010). ""That Special Atmosphere Outside of National Boundaries": Three Jewish Directors and the American School of Classical Studies at Athens". Annuario della Scuola Archeologica Italiana di Atene. 87: 119–131. ISSN 0067-0081.
- Davis, Jack L. (2021). "Spyridon Marinatos and Carl Blegen at Pylos: A Happy Collaboration". In Kalogeropoulos, Konstantinos; Vassilikou, Dora; Tiverios, Michalis (eds.). Sidelights on Greek Antiquity: Archaeological and Epigraphical Essays in Honour of Vasileios Petrakos. Berlin and Boston: De Gruyter. pp. 441–450. doi:10.1515/9783110699326-022. ISBN 978-3-11-069909-8. S2CID 233799176.
- Davis, Jack L. (2022). A Greek State in Formation: The Origins of Civilisation in Mycenaean Pylos. Sather Classical Lectures. Vol. 75. Oakland: University of California Press. ISBN 978-0-520-38724-9. JSTOR j.ctv2rb75vw.
- Doumas, Christos (2007). "Akrotiri on Thera: The Excavation of a Buried City (1967)". In Valavanis, Panos (ed.). Great Moments in Greek Archaeology. Translated by Hardy, David. Los Angeles: J. Paul Getty Editions. pp. 236–255. ISBN 9780892369102.
- Driessen, Jan; MacDonald, Colin F. (2020) [1997]. The Troubled Island: Minoan Crete Before and After the Santorini Eruption. Vol. 17. Louvain: Peeters. doi:10.2307/j.ctv1q26kbf. ISBN 978-90-429-4292-9. JSTOR j.ctv1q26kbf. S2CID 241890669.
- Driessen, Jan (2019). "The Santorini Eruption: An Archaeological Investigation of Its Distal Impacts on Minoan Crete". Quaternary International. 499: 195–2014. Bibcode:2019QuInt.499..195D. doi:10.1016/j.quaint.2018.04.019. ISSN 1040-6182. S2CID 134951079.
- Duffy, Xavier (2018). Commemorating Conflict: Greek Monuments of the Persian Wars. Oxford: Archaeopress. ISBN 978-1-78491-839-2.
- Dyson, Stephen L. (2008). In Pursuit of Ancient Pasts: A History of Classical Archaeology in the Nineteenth and Twentieth Centuries. New Haven: Yale University Press. ISBN 978-0-300-13497-1.
- Flouda, Georgia (2017). "Archaeology in the War Zone: August Schörgendorfer and the Kunstschutz on Crete During World War II". The Annual of the British School at Athens. 112: 341–377. doi:10.1017/S0068245417000028. ISSN 0068-2454. JSTOR 26573024. S2CID 165145348.
- Gates, Charles (2004). "The Adoption of Pictorial Imagery in Minoan Wall Painting: A Comparativist Perspective". In Chapin, Anne P. (ed.). ΧΑΡΙΣ: Essays in Honor of Sara A. Immerwahr. Hesperia Supplements. Vol. 33. Athens: American School of Classical Studies at Athens. pp. 27–46. ISBN 978-0-87661-533-1. JSTOR 1354061.
- Gere, Cathy (2009). Knossos and the Prophets of Modernism. The University of Chicago Press. ISBN 978-0-226-28954-0.
- Gofa, Maria Pantelidou; Philippa-Touchais, Anna; Papadimitriou, Nikolas (2020). "The Prehistoric Tumuli of Vranas, Marathon: The Study of S. Marinatos' Excavations". In Papadimitriou, Nikolas; Wright, James C.; Fachard, Sylvian; Polychronakou-Sgouritsa, Naya; Andrikou, Eleni (eds.). Αthens and Attica in Prehistory: Proceedings of the International Conference, Athens, 27–31 May 2015. Oxford: Archaeopress. pp. 437–448. ISBN 978-1-78969-671-4.
- "Greek Junta Dismisses Foremost Archaeologist". The New York Times. 1 February 1974. p. 7.
- Hamilakis, Yannis (2007). The Nation and Its Ruins: Antiquity, Archaeology, and National Imagination in Greece. Oxford University Press. ISBN 978-0-19-923038-9.
- Higgins, Reynold (1973). "Life and Art in Prehistoric Thera, by S. Marinatos". The Antiquaries Journal. 53 (2): 305. doi:10.1017/S0003581500075818. ISSN 0003-5815. S2CID 162843360.
- Hood, Sinclair (1984). "Review: Thera: Pompeii of the Ancient Aegean. Excavations at Akrotiri 1969–79 by Christos G. Doumas". The Antiquaries Journal. 64 (1): 142–143. doi:10.1017/S0003581500067743. ISSN 0003-5815.
- Iakovidis, Spyridon (1975). "Spyridon N. Marinatos". Gnomon (in German). 47 (6): 635–638. ISSN 0017-1417. JSTOR 27686304.
- Kakaounaki, Marianna (4 September 2014). "A Chronicle of Efforts to Trace Antiquities Looted in WWII". ekathimerini.com. International New York Times.
- Karadima, Agathi (2020). Coastal Cult: The Case of Drakaina Cave on Kephallonia (PDF) (PhD thesis). Birkbeck, University of London. Archived from the original (PDF) on 31 December 2022.
- Karo, Georg (1959). Greifen am Thron: Erinnerungen an Knossos [Griffins at the Throne: Recollections of Knossos] (in German). Baden-Baden: Bruno Grimm. OCLC 645013.
- Kiminas, Demetrius (2009). The Ecumenical Patriarchate. San Bernardino: The Borgo Press. ISBN 978-1-4344-5876-6.
- Koliopoulos, John S.; Veremis, Thanos M. (2010). Modern Greece: A History Since 1821. Chichester: Wiley-Blackwell. ISBN 978-1-4443-1483-0.
- Kokkinidou, Dimitra; Nikolaidou, Marianna (2006) [2004]. "On the Stage and Behind the Scenes: Greek Archaeology in Times of Dictatorship". In Galaty, Michael L.; Watkinson, Charles (eds.). Archaeology Under Dictatorship. New York: Springer. pp. 155–190. ISBN 0-306-48509-5.
- Kouki, Eleni; Antoniou, Dimitris (2017). "Making the Junta Fascist: Antidictatorial Struggle, the Colonels, and the Statues of Ioannis Metaxas". Journal of Modern Greek Studies. 35 (2): 451–480. doi:10.1353/mgs.2017.0027. ISSN 0738-1727. S2CID 148760637.
- Lolos, Yannos G. (2023) [1998]. "Marinatos in Pylos". In Davis, Jack L. (ed.). Sandy Pylos: An Archaeological History from Nestor to Navarino (2nd ed.). Athens: American School of Classical Studies at Athens. pp. 47–50. ISBN 978-1-62139-046-6.
- Loy, Michael; Stocker, Sharon; Davis, Jack L. (2021). "From Archive to GIS: Recovering Spatial Information for Tholos IV at the Palace of Nestor from the Notebooks of Lord William Taylour". Internet Archaeology. 57. doi:10.11141/ia.56.5. ISSN 1363-5387.
- McDonald, William; Thomas, Carol G. (1990) [1967]. Progress into the Past: The Rediscovery of Mycenaean Civilisation (2nd ed.). Bloomington and Indianapolis: Indiana University Press. ISBN 978-0-253-33627-9.
- MacGillivray, Joseph Alexander (2000). Minotaur: Sir Arthur Evans and the Archaeology of the Minoan Myth. New York: Hill and Wang. ISBN 978-0-8090-3035-4.
- Marinatos, Nanno (2014). Σπύρος Ιακωβίδης και Σπυρίδων Μαρινάτος [Spyros Iakovidis and Spyridon Marinatos]. Μέντωρ [Mentor] (in Greek). 109: 161–172.
- Marinatos, Nanno (2015a). Akrotiri: Thera and the Eastern Mediterranean. Athens: Troia Ekdotiki Emporiki. ISBN 978-960-464-666-1.
- Marinatos, Nanno (2015b). Ὁ Μαρινᾶτος στὴ Γερμανία τοῦ Μεσοπολέμου καὶ ὁ «ἀστικὸς ἀνθρωπισμὸς» [Marinatos in Germany in the Inter-War Period and 'Urbane Humanism'] (PDF). Mentor (in Greek). 114: 50–62.
- Marinatos, Nanno (2015c). "On the Authenticity of the 'Minos Ring': Evidence from Spyridon Marinatos's Archives". In Panagiotopoulos, Diamantis (ed.). Ein Minoer im Exil: Festschrift für Wolf-Dietrich Niemeier [A Minoan in Exile: Festschrift for Wolf-Dietrich Niemeier]. Universitätsforschungen zur Prähistorischen Archäologie. Vol. 270. Bonn: Dr. Rudolf Habelt GmbH. pp. 271–280. ISBN 978-3-7749-3971-4.
- Marinatos, Nanno (2020). Sir Arthur Evans and Minoan Crete. London: Bloomsbury. ISBN 978-1-350-19735-0.
- Mazower, Mark (2016). After the War Was Over: Reconstructing the Family, Nation, and State in Greece, 1943–1960. Princeton University Press. ISBN 978-1-4008-8443-8.
- McCrum, Robert (24 July 2005). "Could This Really Be Atlantis?". The Observer – via The Guardian.
- Megaw, A. H. S. (1968). "Archaeology in Greece, 1967–68". Archaeological Reports. 14: 3–26. doi:10.1017/S0570608400003963. ISSN 0570-6084. JSTOR 581041. S2CID 131361650.
- Mertens, Joan R. (1979). "Later Cycladic Art: Thera and Phylakopi". In von Bothmer, Dietrich (ed.). Greek Art of the Aegean Islands. New York: Metropolitan Museum of Art. ISBN 0-87099-216-3.
- Mishkova, Diana (2022). Rival Byzantiums: Empire and Identity in Southeastern Europe. Cambridge University Press. doi:10.1017/9781108759557. ISBN 978-1-108-49990-3.
- Mylonas, George E. (1972). Ὁ ταφικὸς Κύκλος Β τῶν Μυκηνῶν [Grave Circle B at Mycenae] (PDF) (in Greek). Vol. 1. Athens: Archaeological Society of Athens. OCLC 563477782.
- Naddaf, Gerard (1994). "The Atlantis Myth: An Introduction to Plato's Later Philosophy of History". Phoenix. 48 (3): 189–209. doi:10.2307/3693746. ISSN 0031-8299. JSTOR 3693746.
- "Nanno Marinatos: A Tribute". Journal of Ancient Egyptian Interconnections. 7 (3): 1–2. 2015. ISSN 1944-2815.
- Palyvou, Clairy (2014). "Spyridon Marinatos 1901–74". In Fagan, Brian (ed.). The Great Archaeologists. London: Thames and Hudson. pp. 158–160. ISBN 978-0-500-05181-8.
- Papadopoulos, John K. (1993). "The Correspondence of A. J. B. Wace in the Library of the Australian Archaeological Institute at Athens". The Annual of the British School at Athens. 88: 337–352. doi:10.1017/S0068245400016002. ISSN 0068-2454. JSTOR 30064372. S2CID 163694465.
- Payne, H. G. G. (1935). "Archaeology in Greece, 1934–1935". The Journal of Hellenic Studies. 55 (2): 147–171. doi:10.2307/627367. ISSN 0075-4269. JSTOR 627367. S2CID 162866788.
- Petrakos, Vasileios (1995). Η περιπέτεια της ελληνικής αρχαιολογίας στον βίο του Χρήστου Καρούζου [The Adventure of Greek Archaeology in the Life of Christos Karouzos] (PDF) (in Greek). Archaeological Society of Athens. ISBN 960-7036-47-6. Archived from the original (PDF) on 15 October 2021.
- Petrakos, Vasileios (1996). Marathon: Archaeological Guide (PDF). Library of the Archaeological Society of Athens. Vol. 155. Archaeological Society of Athens. ISBN 960-7036-57-3.
- Petrakos, Vasileios (1997). Ιωάννης Κ. Παπαδημητρίου [John K. Papadimitriou]. Έπαινος Ιωάννου Κ. Παπαδημητρίου [Praise of John K. Papadimitriou] (PDF). Library of the Archaeological Society of Athens (in Greek). Vol. 168. Archaeological Society of Athens. pp. 9–51. ISBN 960-7036-70-0.
- Petrakos, Vasileios (2015). Ὁ πολιτικὸς Μαρινᾶτος [The Political Marinatos] (PDF). Mentor. 114: 16–49.
- Platon, Lefteris (2012) [2010]. "Kato Zakros". In Cline, Eric H. (ed.). The Oxford Handbook of the Bronze Age Aegean. Oxford University Press. pp. 509–517. ISBN 978-0-19-024075-2.
- Prevedorou, Eleni Anna (2015). The Role of Kin Relations and Residential Mobility During the Transition from Final Neolithic to Early Bronze Age in Attica, Greece (PDF) (PhD thesis). Arizona State University. Archived from the original (PDF) on 18 January 2023.
- Raphael, Frederic (2019). Antiquity Matters. New Haven: Yale University Press. doi:10.12987/9780300231748-002. ISBN 978-0-300-21537-3. JSTOR j.ctv1bvnfc6.
- Rovatsou, Angeliki (4 March 2015). Συνεντεύξεις: Μια ζωή γεμάτη σχέδια [Interview: A Life Full of Plans]. Αρχαιολογία και Τέχνες [Archaeology and Arts] (in Greek).
- Skofa, Maria (2005). Τσέπι Μαραθώνος: Το Πρωτοελλαδικό Νεκροταφείο [Tsepi, Marathon: The Early Helladic Cemetery] (in Greek). Archaeological Society of Athens. ISBN 960-8145-45-7.
- Snodgrass, Anthony (1983). "Archaeology". In Crawford, Michael (ed.). Sources for Ancient History. Cambridge University Press. pp. 137–184. ISBN 0-521-24782-9.
- Spencer, Nigel (2023) [1998]. "The History of Archaeological Investigations in Messenia". In Davis, Jack L. (ed.). Sandy Pylos: An Archaeological History from Nestor to Navarino (2nd ed.). Athens: American School of Classical Studies at Athens. pp. 23–41. ISBN 978-1-62139-046-6.
- "Spyridon Marinatos, Discoverer of City Ruined in 1500 BC, Dies". The New York Times. 3 October 1974. p. 46.
- Thompson, Homer A. (1975). "Spyridon Marinatos: November 4, 1901 – October 1, 1974". Archaeology. 28 (1): 59–60. JSTOR 41685618.
- Tsipopoulou, Metaxia (2010). "The Work of Arthur Evans at Knossos as Documented in the Historical Archive of the Greek Archaeological Service (1922–31)". In Krzyszkowska, Olga (ed.). Cretan Offerings: Studies in Honour of Peter Warren. British School at Athens Studies. Vol. 18. London: British School at Athens. pp. 339–352. ISBN 978-0-904887-62-4.
- Vermeule, Emily Townsend (December 1967). "The Promise of Thera: A Bronze Age Pompeii". The Atlantic.
- Vitaliano, Dorothy B. (1971). "Atlantis: A Review Essay". Journal of the Folklore Institute. 8 (1): 66–76. doi:10.2307/3814065. ISSN 0015-5934. JSTOR 3814065.
- Vlachopoulos, Andreas (2014). Επί των ήλων του τύπου: Ο Σπυρίδων Μαρινάτος στον τύπο 50 χρόνων (1925–1974) [On the Record: Spyridon Marinatos's Fifty Years in the Press (1925–1974)]. In Mantzourani, Eleni; Marinatos, Nanno (eds.). Σπυρίδων Μαρινάτος 1901–1974 [Spyridon Marinatos 1901–1974] (in Greek). Athens: Kardamitsa. pp. 339–385. ISBN 978-960-354-338-1.
- Vlachopoulos, Andreas (2021). "The Early Μycenaeans of Pylos: The Evidence from the Chamber Tomb Cemetery at Volimidia". In Eder, Birgitta; Zavadil, Michaela (eds.). (Social) Place and Space in Early Mycenaean Greece: International Discussions in Mycenaean Archaeology, October 5–8, 2016, Athens. Mykenische Studien. Vol. 35. Vienna: Austrian Academy of Science Press. ISBN 978-3-7001-8854-4.
- Warren, Peter (1979). "The Miniature Fresco from the West House at Akrotiri, Thera, and Its Aegean Setting". The Journal of Hellenic Studies. 99: 115–129. doi:10.2307/630636. ISSN 0075-4269. JSTOR 630636. S2CID 161908616.
- Whitley, James (2020). "Homer and History". In Pache, Corinne Ondine; Dué, Casey; Lupack, Susan; Lamberton, Robert (eds.). The Cambridge Guide to Homer. Cambridge University Press. pp. 257–266. ISBN 978-1-107-02719-0.
- Whitling, Frederick (2019). Western Ways: Foreign Schools in Rome and Athens. Boston: De Gruyter. ISBN 978-3-11-060158-9.
- Younger, John G. (2002). "Women in Relief: 'Double Consciousness' in Classical Attic Tombstones". In Rabinowitz, Nancy Sorkin; Auanger, Lisa (eds.). Among Women: From the Homosocial to the Homoerotic in the Ancient World. Austin: University of Texas Press. pp. 167–210. doi:10.7560/771130. ISBN 978-0-292-77113-0. JSTOR 10.7560/771130.11.
