= Romanos, Messenia =

Romanos Ρωμανός
- Community
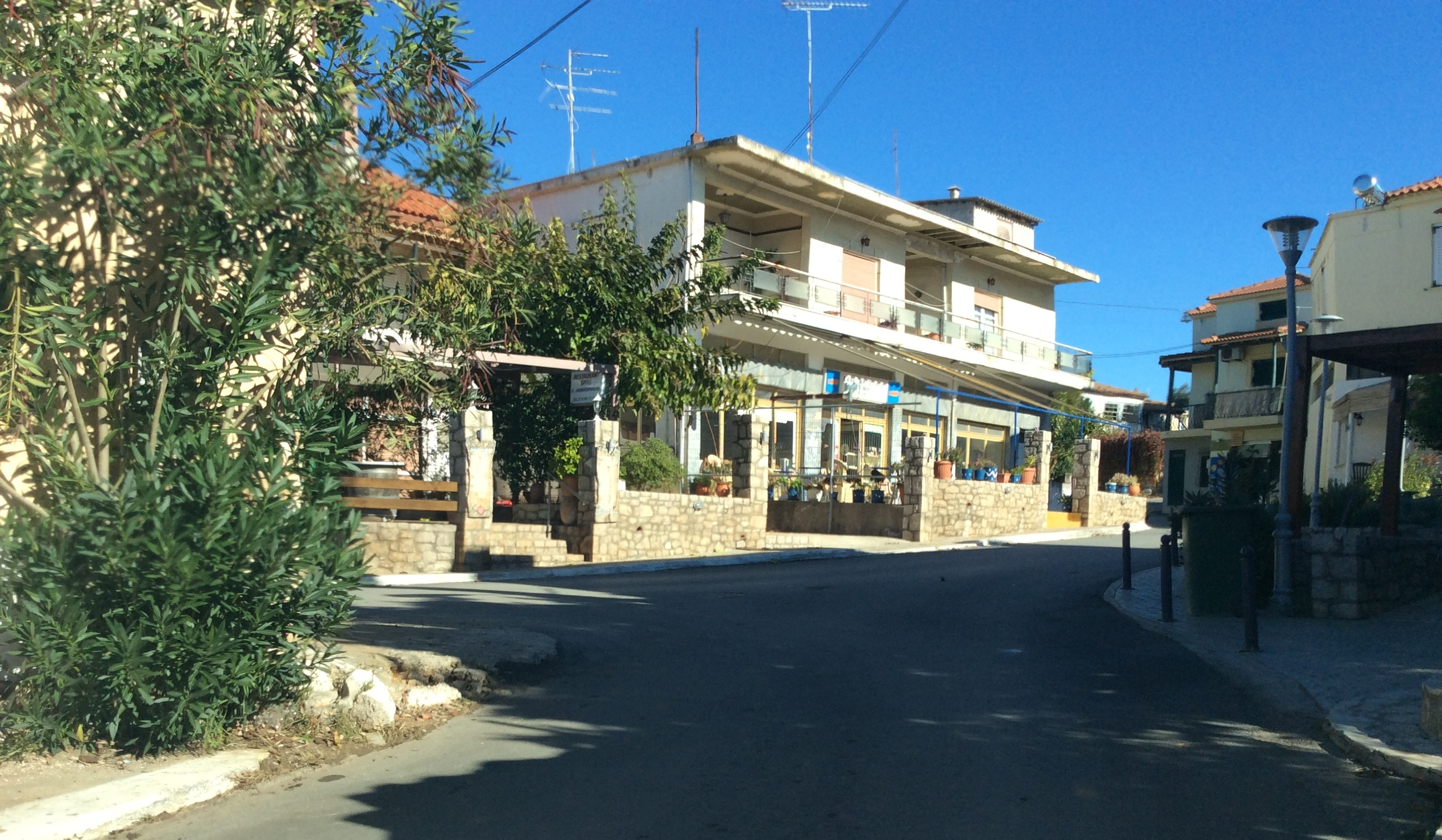
- Street of Romanos

- Location within Greece
- Coordinates: 36°59′35″N 21°39′47″E
- Country: Greece
- Administrative region: Peloponnese
- Regional unit: Messenia
- Municipality: Pylos-Nestoras
- Municipal unit: Nestoras

Population (2021)
  - Community: 324
- Time zone: UTC+2 (EET)
  - Summer (DST): UTC+3 (EEST)

Romanos or Romanou for locals (Greek: Ρωμανός) is a village and a community in the municipality Pylos-Nestoras, Messenia, Greece. It is 9 km (6 mi) north of Pylos. It is part of the Nestoras municipal unit. The community consists of the villages Romanos and Petrochori. Petrochori is famous because of the Voidokilia beach. Also, near the village there is Nestor's cave.
