= Philomache =

Ancient Greek mythological figure

In Greek mythology, Philomache or Phylomache (Ancient Greek: Φυλομάχη) was a Minyan princess who became a queen of Iolcus.

== Family ==
Phylomache was the daughter of King Amphion of Orchomenus and thus sister to Chloris, wife of Neleus. She was named as the wife of Pelias, king of Iolcus and mother of Acastus, Pisidice, Pelopia, Hippothoe and Alcestis. But other sources say that the wife of Pelias and the mother of these children was the daughter of Bias named Anaxibia or Alphesiboea.

== Mythology ==
The only account that mentioned Phylomache was that of Apollodorus:

But Pelias dwelt in Thessaly and married Anaxibia, daughter of Bias, but according to some his wife was Phylomache, daughter of Amphion; and he begat a son, Acastus, and daughters, Pisidice, Pelopia, Hippothoe, and Alcestis.
