= Eurydice (daughter of Clymenus) =

Wife of Nestor

In Greek mythology, according to Homer's Odyssey, Eurydice (/jʊəˈrɪdɪsi/; Ancient Greek: Εὐρυδίκη, Eurydikē "wide justice", derived from ευρυς eurys "wide" and δικη dike "justice"), the eldest daughter of Clymenus, was the wife of Nestor. However, according to the mythographer Apollodorus, the wife of Nestor and mother of his children (daughters Pisidice and Polycaste, and sons Perseus, Stratichus, Aretus, Echephron, Peisistratus, Antilochus, and Thrasymedes) was Anaxibia.
