= Persepolis (disambiguation) =

Persepolis is an ancient capital city that resided in Persia, in what is now Iran.

Persepolis may also refer to:

- Persepolis F.C., a professional football club based in Tehran, Iran
- Persepolis (comics), an autobiographical graphic novel by Marjane Satrapi
  - Persepolis (film), a 2007 French-American animated film
- Persepolis, a piece of music composed by Iannis Xenakis
- Iranian vessel Persepolis, a warship commissioned in 1885 and in service until 1925
- Persepolis, an Anomaly series of Ingress
- Persepolis (mythology), a minor figure in Greek mythology
