= Voidokilia beach =

Beach in Messenia, Greece

Coordinates: 36.9640°N 21.6596°E

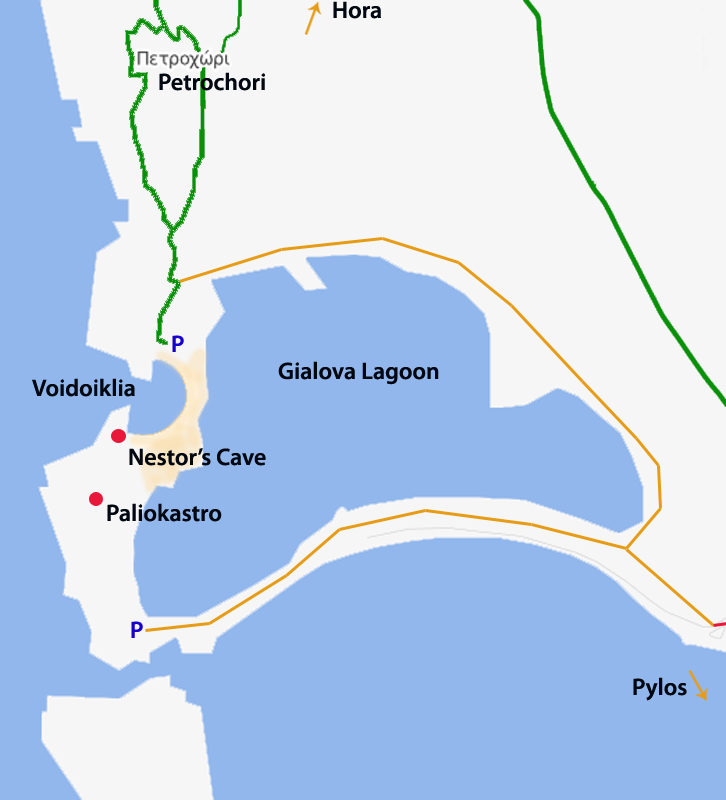
Voidokilia location map.

Voidokilia Beach (Greek: Παραλία Βοϊδοκοιλιά, pronounced [voʝðociˈʎa]) is a popular beach in Messinia, southern Greece, on the Ionian Sea. In the shape of the Greek letter omega (Ω), its sand forms a semicircular strip of dunes. On the land-facing side of the strip of dunes is Gialova Lagoon, an important bird habitat. The beach has been named "A Place of Particular Natural Beauty". It is part of a Natura 2000 protected area.

== Location ==
A hiking route begins from Voidokoilia. The climb towards Nestor's Cave begins at the south-west end of the beach, while after the cave the route continues towards Paliokastro. Voidokilia is next to Petrohori in Messinia, Greece. Though the ruins are not fenced off, the castle ruins are sign-posted as closed and tourists walk through the castle or around the walls at their own risk.

Gialova's aquatic habitat, being an important stop for a variety of migratory birds, has been declared the southernmost Habitat of National Importance in the Balkans. It is considered a protected area hosting 258 species of birds out of which the 79 are included in the "Red Book" (species under threat of extinction).

Parking for the beach is reached by sand tracks either from the Gialova Lagoon parking area (also used by bird-watchers) or by following the Northside route from Petrochori. The beach is considered friendly for naturists and gay tourists.

== History and myth ==
Above the beach is Nestor's Cave and above this are the ruins of thirteenth-century Frankish castle (Old Navarino or Palaiokastro). Overlooking the beach at the north eastern end is the tomb of Nestor's son, Thrasymedes of the Mycenaean period (1680–1060 BC) with Neolithic finds at the same site showing occupation as early as 4000 BC.

The beach is presumed to be Homer's "sandy Pylos" where Telemachus was welcomed by King Nestor when searching for his father, Odysseus. According to myth, Nestor's Cave is where Hermes hid the cattle stolen from Apollo.

== Archaeology ==
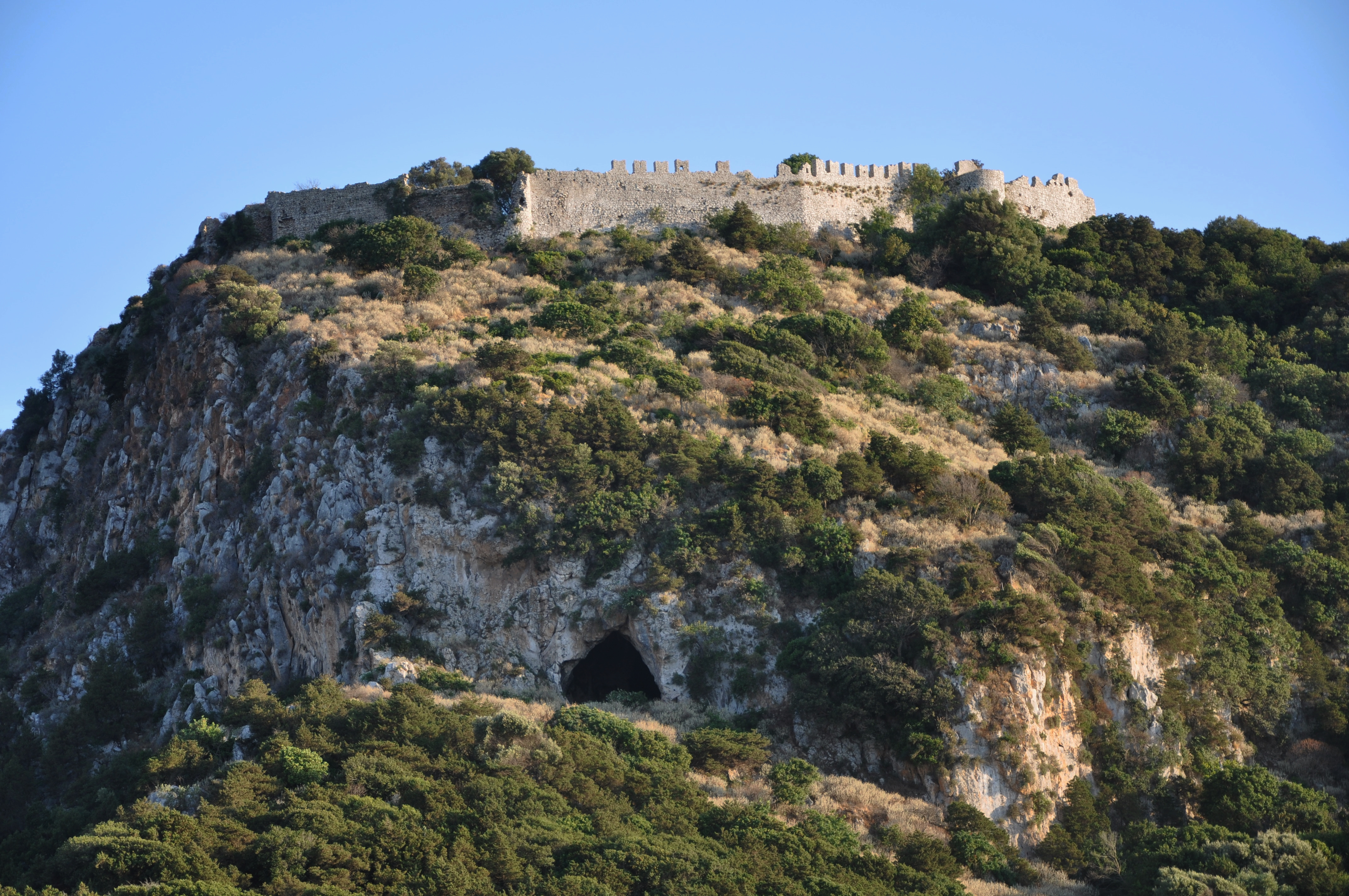
View of the castle and Nestor's cave from the beach

To the south of the beach stretches cape Koryphasion, where stood the classical city of Pylos. Nowadays very few remains of the city are still extant, as in the 13th century Nicholas de Saint'Omer built a castle on the top of the cape using the extant building material consisting of the ancient stones. Beneath the castle a triangular opening on the rock, visible from Voidokoilia, marks the Cave of Nestor, where, according to mythology Hermes had hidden the stolen oxen of Helios, whereas according to Pausanias (36.2) it was the place where were kept the cattle of the king Neleus. The cave has been archaeologically investigated in various periods, starting from H Schliemann in 1874 and continuing with the research by Laucent and Kourouniotis in the beginning of the 20th century, C. Blegen and W Mc Donald, Sp. Marinatos in the 1950s and finally G. Korres and A. Samson in the 1980s. It has yielded finds dating from the Final Neolithic period down to the Late Helladic period as well as some later, classical and early Hellenistic traces. The dimensions of the cave are 20x16 with a height which reaches 30 meters.

The tomb of Thrasymedes, on the other hand, has been excavated by Spyridon Marinatos in the 1950s and by G.S. Korres in the 1970s, since the latter noticed a pithos burial which had not been recorded by his predecessor. The tholos is 5 meters wide and its floor is covered with pebbles. It contained about seven burials. Among the movable finds of the (otherwise looted in the past) tomb count arrow heads, necklaces made of carnelian and amethyst, two Mycenaean pottery vessels, etc. The first use of the tumulus (pithos burials' phase) dates to the Middle Helladic Period whereas the prime time of the beehive tomb was the Mycenaean period. Around the tomb were found Late Classical and Hellenistic votive tablets as well as a small model of an altar, which points to some kind of hero or ancestors' cult.

== Gallery ==
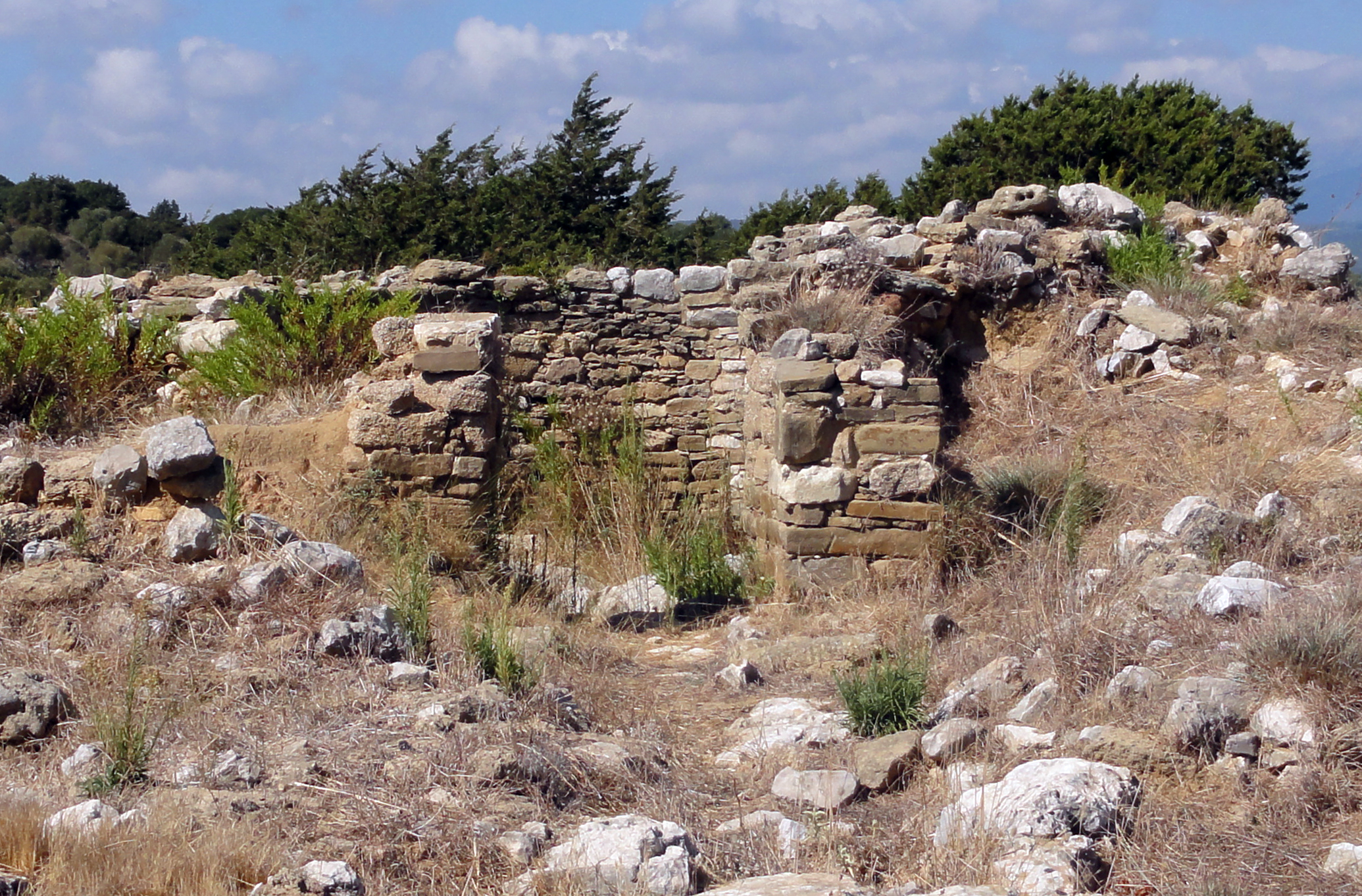
Thrasymedes' tomb

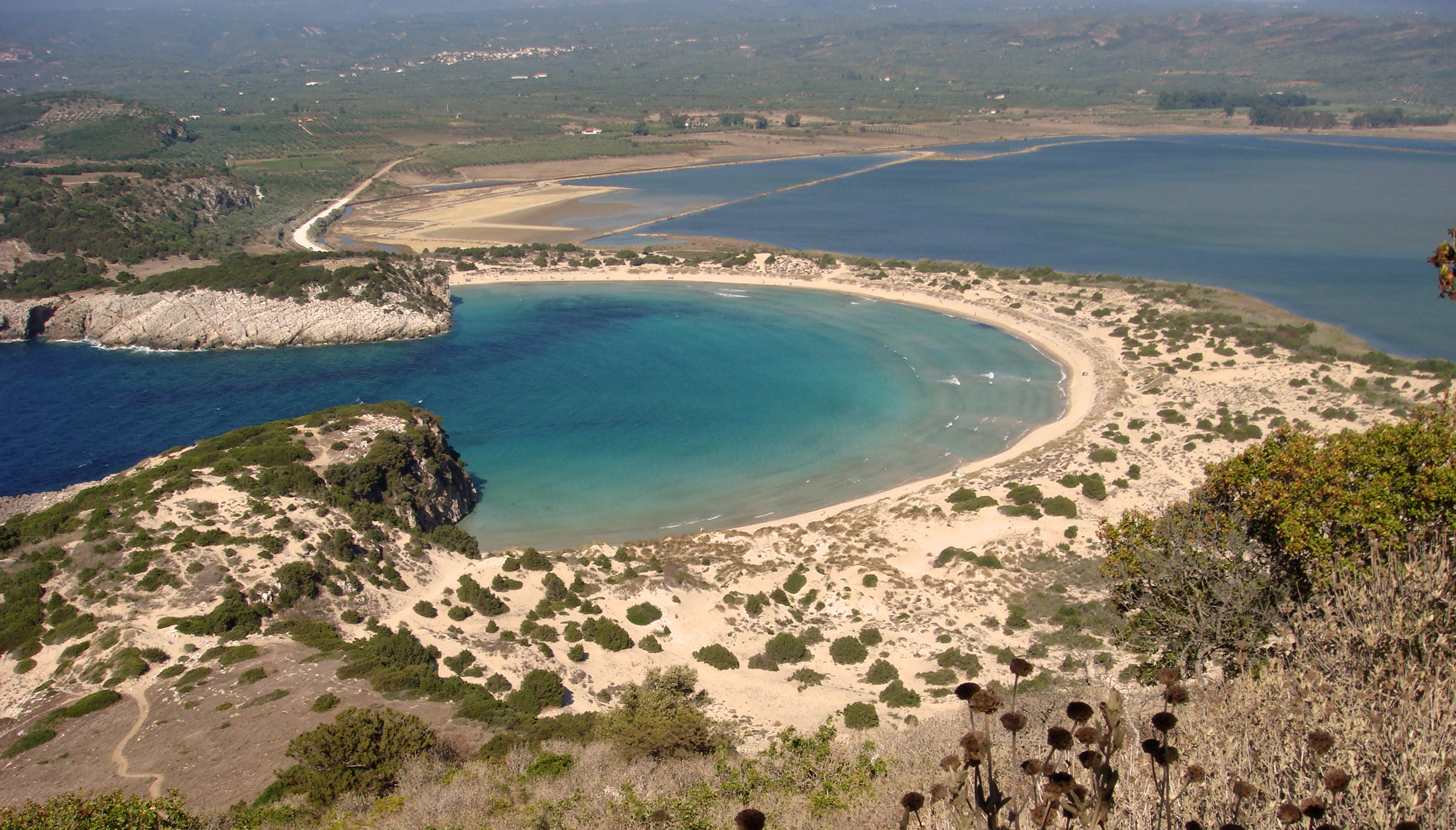
View from Nestor's Cave looking down to the beach and the lagoon

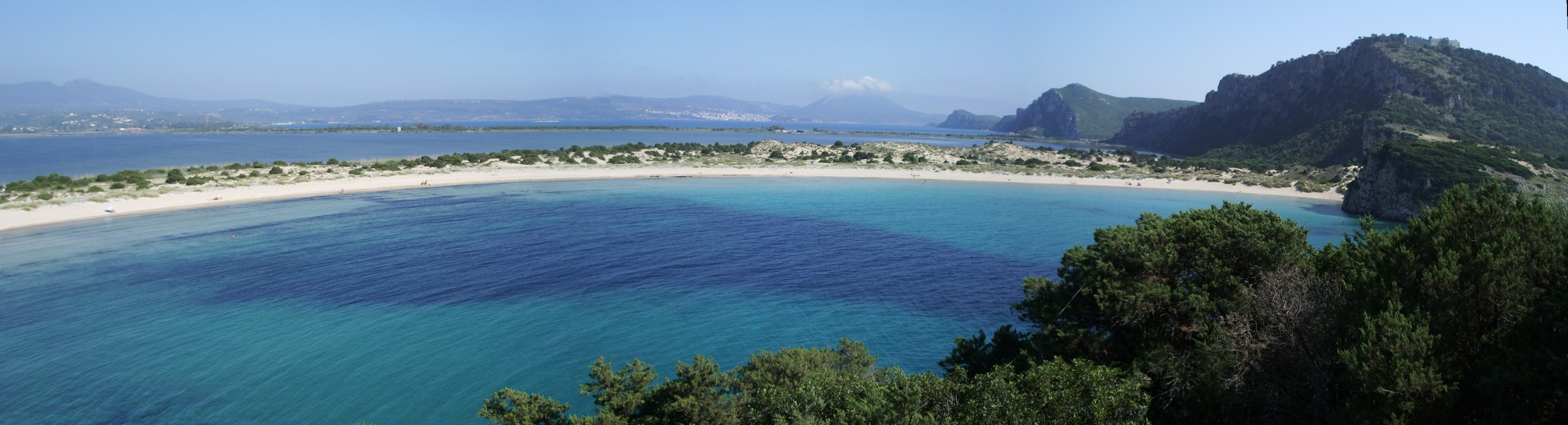
View from Thrasymedes' tomb
