= Echephron =

Multiple Greek mythological figures

Echephron (/ɪˈkɛfrən, -ˌrɒn/; Ancient Greek: Ἐχέφρων, gen.: Ἐχέφρωνος) is the name of three characters in Greek mythology.

- Echephron, a prince of Pylos and son of King Nestor and Eurydice (or Anaxibia). He was the brother of Thrasymedes, Pisidice, Polycaste, Perseus, Stratichus, Aretus, Pisistratus and Antilochus.
- Echephron, a Trojan prince as one of the sons of Priam, king of Troy.
- Echephron, son of Heracles and Psophis, daughter of Eryx, a Sicilian despot. He changed the name of the city Phegia (the old Erymanthus) to Psophis.
