= Perseus of Pylos =

Son of Nestor in Greek mythology

In Greek mythology, Perseus (/ˈpɜːrsiəs, -sjuːs/; Ancient Greek: Περσεύς) was a prince of Pylos in Messenia.

== Biography ==
Perseus was the son of King Nestor either by Eurydice or Anaxibia. He was the brother to Thrasymedes, Pisidice, Polycaste, Peisistratus, Stratichus, Aretus, Echephron and Antilochus.
