= Peisistratus (son of Nestor) =

Son of Nestor

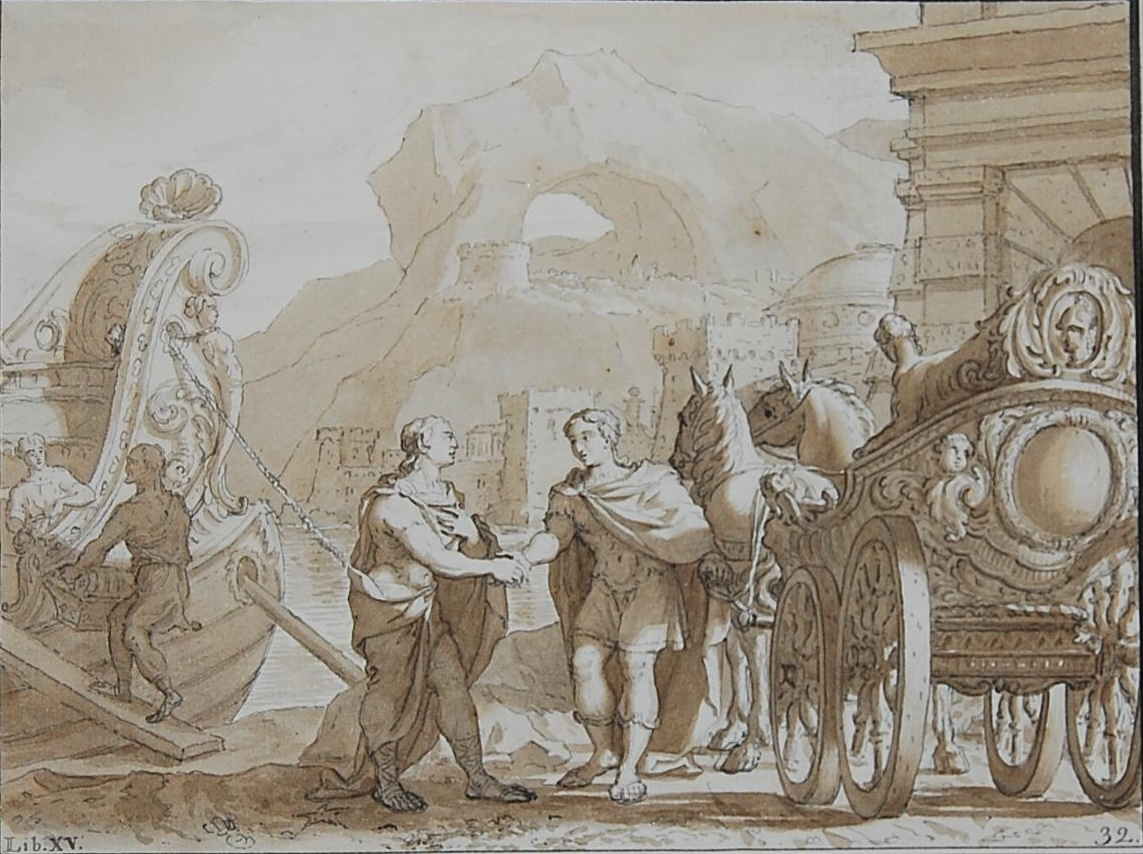
Drawing of Telemachus and Peisistratus parting at Pylos by Tako Hajo Jelgersma

In Greek mythology, Peisistratus (Ancient Greek: Πεισίστρατος, romanized: Peisistratos) was a prince of Pylos in Messenia.

== Family ==
Peisistratus was the youngest son of King Nestor either by Eurydice or Anaxibia. He was the brother to Thrasymedes, Pisidice, Polycaste, Perseus, Stratichus, Aretus, Echephron, and Antilochus.

== Mythology ==
Peisistratus became an intimate friend of Telemachus, son of Odysseus, and travelled with him on his unsuccessful search for his father. Like Telemachus, Peisistratus was only a small boy when his father (and brothers Antilochus and Thrasymedes) left to fight in the Trojan War.
