= Persepolis (mythology) =

Son of Telemachus in Greek mythology

In Greek mythology, Persepolis (Ancient Greek: Περσέπολις) or Perseptolis (Περσέπτολις) was the son of Telemachus.

The 12th-century AD Byzantine scholar Eustathius of Thessalonica, in his commentary on the Odyssey, writes that the 8th- or 7th-century BC poet Hesiod considered the mother of Persepolis to be Polycaste, the daughter of Nestor. In the same place in his commentary, Eustathius also states that Nausicaa, the daughter of Alcinous, was said to be his mother by the 5th-century BC logographer Hellanicus of Lesbos and the 4th-century BC philosopher Aristotle.
