= Hippothoe =

In Greek mythology, Hippothoe (Ancient Greek: Ἱπποθόη, romanized: Hippothoê or Hippothoē, lit. 'swift as a mare' or 'swift-running horse') is the name of five distinct characters.

- Hippothoe, the "lovely" Nereid and one of the 50 marine-nymph daughters of the 'Old Man of the Sea' Nereus and the Oceanid Doris. Her name means running horses (i.e. waves).
- Hippothoe, a Libyan princess as one of the Danaïdes, daughters of King Danaus. She married and killed her cousin Obrimus, son of King Aegyptus of Egypt.
- Hippothoe, daughter of Mestor, son of Perseus, and of Lysidice, daughter of Pelops. Poseidon abducted Hippothoe from her family and took her to the Echinades islands. There, he sired Taphius who later founded the city of Taphos.
- Hippothoe, one of the Peliades, daughters of Pelias, King of Iolcus. Her mother was either Anaxibia, daughter of Bias, or Phylomache, one of the Niobids.
- Hippothoe, the 'fierce-souled' Amazon who fought with their queen, Penthesilea at Troy. She was killed by Achilles.

Hippothoe is also the scientific name of Lycaena hippothoe, the "Purple-edged Copper" butterfly.
