= Alphesiboea =

Ancient Greek mythological figures

Alphesiboea (Ancient Greek: Ἀλφεσίβοια, romanized: Alphesíboia) was the name of several characters in Greek mythology:

- Alphesiboea, mother of Adonis with Phoenix.
- Alphesiboea, a Psophian princess as the daughter of King Phegeus in Arcadia. She was the sister of Axion and Temenus, and married Alcmaeon who was purified by her father for the murder of his mother Eriphyle. Alphesiboea was deserted by her husband for the love of Callirhoe, daughter of the river-god Achelous. In revenge, her brothers Axion and Temenus at the command of their father treacherously slew their brother-in-law. Phegeus was also said to have murdered Alcmaeon himself and also Alphesiboea's unnamed daughter. Later on, the widowed sister, Alphesiboea killed her own brothers in revenge of her husbands's death. In some versions of this myth, she is called Arsinoe.
- Alphesiboea, a daughter of Bias and Pero, and sister to Aretus and Perialkes. She was the wife of Pelias. This character, however, is usually called Anaxibia or other sources had Phylomache, Minyan daughter of King Amphion of Orchomenus as the spouse of Pelias.
- Alphesiboea, an Indian nymph, who was obsessively coveted by Dionysus, but she refused to yield to his wishes, that is until the god changed himself into a tiger, and thus compelled her by fear of threat to allow him to carry her across the river Sollax, which from this circumstance received the name of Tigris. With him, she eventually became mother of Medes.
