= Aretus =

Several characters in Greek mythology

Aretus (/əˈriːtəs/; Ancient Greek: Ἄρητος, Árētos) was one of several characters in Greek mythology:

- Aretus, son of Bias and Pero, and brother of Perialces and Alphesiboea, wife of King Pelias of Iolcus.
- King Aretus of Pylos, son of Nestor and Eurydice (or Anaxibia). He was the brother to Thrasymedes, Pisidice, Polycaste, Perseus, Stratichus, Peisistratus, Echephron and Antilochus.
- Aretus, armed his force under compulsion and joined King Deriades of India against Dionysus in the Indian War. His sons were dumb because while he was sacrificing to Aphrodite the day of his marriage, a pregnant sow gave birth to a bastard brood of marine creatures. A seer was asked and he foretold a succession of dumb children to come, like the voiceless generation of the sea. After the war Dionysus restored their voices. His sons, whom he had by Laobie, were Lycus, Myrsus, Glaucus, Periphas and Melaneus.
- Aretus, a warrior in the army of Dionysus during the Indian War. He was killed by King Deriades of India.
- Aretus, prince of Troy and one of fifty sons of Priam. He was killed by Automedon. In another account, Aretus and his brother Echemmon were instead slain by Odysseus.
- Aretus, a Bebrycian who helped to bind gauntlets about the hands of Amycus for his boxing-match. He was later killed by Clytius, one of the Argonauts.
