= Polycaste =

Character from Greek mythology, daughter of Nestor

Polycaste (/ˌpɒlɪˈkæsti/; Ancient Greek: Πολυκάστη) is the name of several different women in Greek mythology:

- Polycaste, a princess of Pylos and daughter of King Nestor and Eurydice (or Anaxibia). She was sister to Thrasymedes, Peisistratus, Pisidice, Perseus, Stratichus, Aretus, Echephron and Antilochus. Polycaste bathed Telemachus on his way to Pylos and later married him. They had a son, Perseptolis.
- Polycaste, daughter of Lygaeus. She was married to Icarius, by whom she became the mother of Penelope, Alyzeus and Leucadius.
- Polycaste, sister of Daedalus and the mother of Perdix. Because her brother killed her son, she laughed with joy when she saw Icarus (Daedalus' own son) fall into the sea and drown when he had flown too close to the sun.
