= Stratichus =

Prince of Pylos in Greek mythology

In Greek mythology, Stratichus (/ˈstrætɪkəs/; Ancient Greek: Στράτιχος Strátikhos), also known as Stratius, was a prince of Pylos and the son of King Nestor and either Eurydice or Anaxibia. He was the brother to Thrasymedes, Pisidice, Polycaste, Perseus, Peisistratus, Aretus, Echephron and Antilochus. Stratichus appears in The Odyssey.
