= Dias (mythology) =

Disambiguation article

In Greek mythology, Dias (Ancient Greek: Δίας) is a name shared by two individuals:

- Dias, according to one tradition, was the son of Pelops and Hippodamia, and the brother of Atreus, and the father of Cleolla. Most accounts have Agamemnon and Menelaus, as the sons of Atreus and Aerope. However according to the Byzantine scholar John Tzetzes (citing "Hesiod, Aeschylus, and some others"), Cleolla was, by her first cousin Pleisthenes (the son of Atreus and Aerope), the mother of Agamemnon, Menelaus and Anaxibia, while, according to the scholia to Euripides Orestes 4, she was married to her uncle Atreus, and was the mother by him of Pleisthenes who became the father of Agamemnon and Menelaus and Anaxibia (by Eriphyle).
- Dias, according to Stephanus of Byzantium, was the son of Abas the brother of Alcon and Arethusa and said to be the founder of the city of Athens in Euboea, naming it after his fatherland.
