= Anaxibia =

Set index of characters in Greek mythology

Anaxibia (/ænəkˈsɪbiə/; Ancient Greek: Ἀναξίβια, lit. 'lord of force' or 'master of might') is the name of six characters in Greek mythology.

- Anaxibia, one of the 50 Danaïdes, daughters of King Danaus of Libya (and later Argos) by an Ethiopian woman. On the instructions of her father, she married and eventually murdered her cousin-husband Archelaus, son of Aegyptus and a Phoenician woman.
- Anaxibia, daughter of Bias and Iphianassa, and niece of Melampus. She married Pelias, King of Iolcus, to whom she bore Acastus, Pisidice, Pelopia, Hippothoe, Alcestis, and Medusa. She was sometimes called Alphesiboea or Phylomache, daughter of Amphion.
- Anaxibia, daughter of Cratieus. She married Nestor and is the mother of Pisidice, Polycaste, Perseus (son of Nestor), Stratichus, Aretus, Echephron, Peisistratus, Antilochus, and Thrasymedes. More commonly, Eurydice of Pylos is considered to be Nestor's wife and the mother of these children.
- Anaxibia, daughter of Atreus and Aerope or, alternatively, of Pleisthenes and Aerope or Pleisthenes and Cleolla (daughter of Dias), and sister of Agamemnon and Menelaus. She married Strophius, king of Phocis, becoming mother of Pylades. Anaxibia was also known as Astyoche or Cydragora.
- Anaxibia, a naiad of the Ganges river. She fled from the advances of Helios, but she disappeared in Artemis's sanctuary on Mount Koryphe.
- Anaxibia, mother of Maeander by Cercaphus.
