= Pisidice =

Person or people from Greek mythology

In Greek mythology, Pisidice or Peisidice (/paɪˈsɪdɪsiː/, Ancient Greek: Πεισιδίκη, romanized: Peisidíkē, lit. 'persuading justice' or 'to convince or persuade [by] justice') was one of the following individuals:

- Pisidice, a Thessalian princess as the daughter of King Aeolus of Aeolia and Enarete, daughter of Deimachus. She was the sister of Salmoneus, Athamas, Sisyphus, Cretheus, Perieres, Deioneus, Magnes, Calyce, Canace, Alcyone and Perimede. Peisidice was the mother of Antiphus and Actor by Myrmidon. She may also be the mother of Myrmidon's other children: Erysichthon, Dioplethes, Hiscilla and Eupolemeia.
- Pisidice, an alternate name for Demonice, mother of Thestius by Ares.
- Pisidice, a princess of Iolcus as the daughter of Pelias, who, together with her sisters, killed their father, as Medea tricked them into believing this was needed to rejuvenate him.
- Pisidice, a Pylian princess and daughter of King Nestor and Anaxibia or Eurydice. She was sister to Polycaste, Perseus, Stratichus, Aretus, Echephron, Pisistratus, Antilochus and Thrasymedes. She was probably the Pisidice who became the mother of Borus by Periclymenus, brother of Nestor and consequently her uncle.
- Pisidice of Methymna, a princess of Methymna, who fell in love with Achilles as he besieged her city, and promised to put Methymna into his possession if he would marry her. He agreed to her terms but, as soon as the city was his, he ordered that she be stoned to death as a traitor.
- Pisidice, a queen of Haliartus as wife of King Copreus. She was of royal descent as well as the daughter of King Leucon of Boeotia. By her husband, Pisidice became the mother of Hippoclus and Argynnos, who was loved by Agamemnon and drowned in River Cephissus.
