= Cleolla =

In Greek mythology the daughter of Dias

In Greek mythology, Cleolla or Cleola (Ancient Greek: Κλεόλλα) was the daughter of Dias, the son of Pelops, and by some accounts the mother, or grandmother, of Agamemnon and Menelaus.

Most accounts have Agamemnon and Menelaus, as the sons of Atreus, the son of Pelops, and Aerope. However according to the Byzantine scholar John Tzetzes (citing "Hesiod, Aeschylus, and some others"), she was, by her first cousin Pleisthenes (the son of Atreus and Aerope), the mother of Agamemnon, Menelaus and Anaxibia, while, according to the scholia to Euripides Orestes 4, she was married to her uncle Atreus, and was the mother by him of Pleisthenes who became the father of Agamemnon and Menelaus and Anaxibia (by Eriphyle).
