= Leipsydrium =

Ancient Greek fortress

Coordinates: 38°07′38″N 23°43′27″E

Leipsydrium, or Leipsydrion (Ancient Greek: Λειψύδριον), was a fortress of ancient Attica, in which the Alcmaeonidae fortified themselves after the death of Hipparchus, but was taken by the Peisistratidae after defeating the opposite party. Herodotus describes it as situated above Paeonia, and other authorities place it above Mount Parnes.

The site of Leipsydrium is tentatively located near modern Gaitana.
