= Antilochus =

Mythological Greek hero in the Trojan War

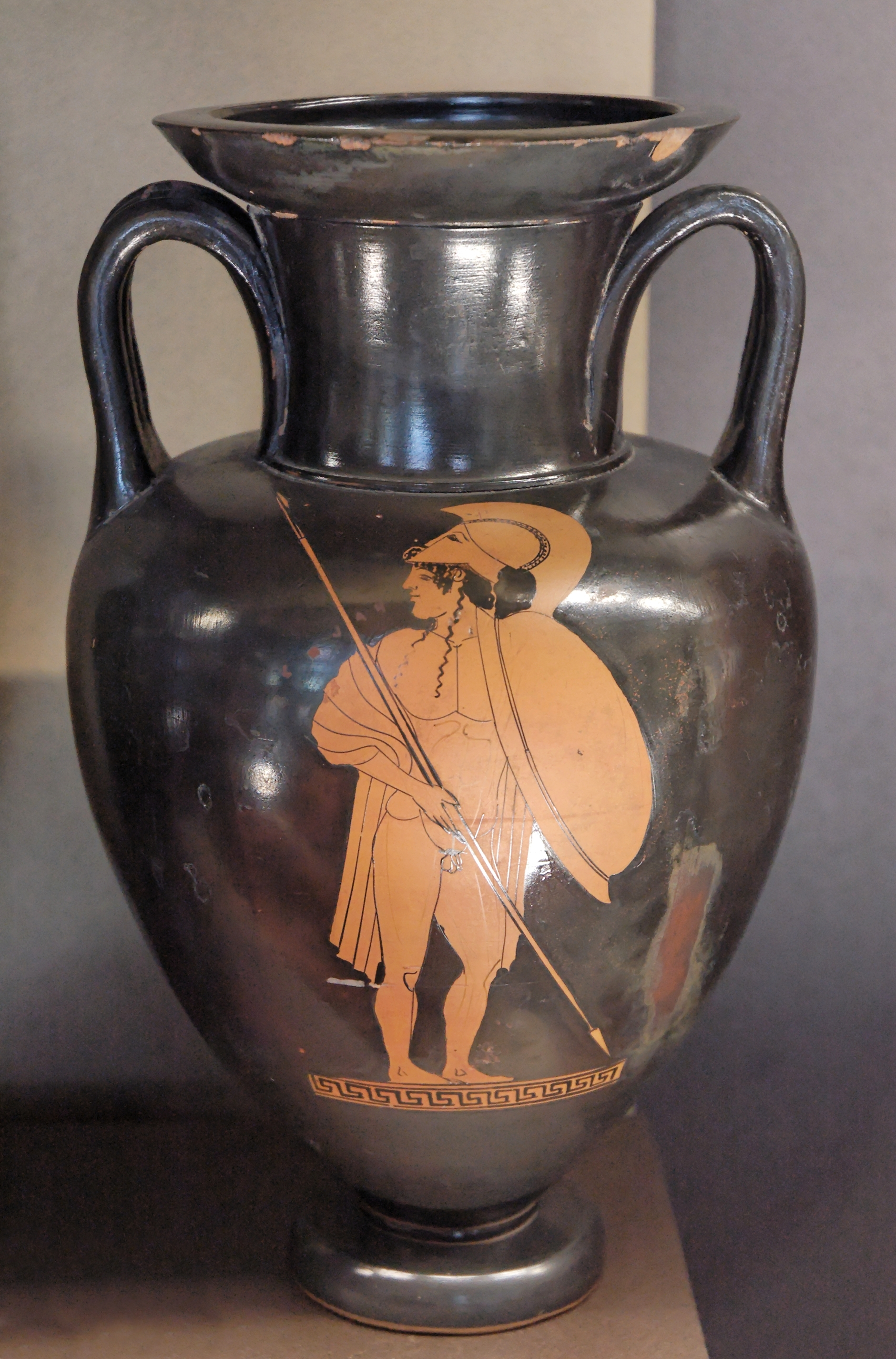
Antilochus on an Attic red-figure amphora ca. 470 BC from the Louvre

In Greek mythology, Antilochus (/ænˈtɪləkəs/; Ancient Greek: Ἀντίλοχος Antílokhos) was a prince of Pylos and one of the Achaeans in the Trojan War. He was the youngest prince to command troops.

== Family ==
Antilochus was the son of King Nestor either by Anaxibia or Eurydice. He was the brother to Thrasymedes, Pisidice, Polycaste, Perseus, Stratichus, Aretus, Echephron and Peisistratus.

== Mythology ==
The Iliad tells of Antilochus' actions during the Trojan War. One of the suitors of Helen, Antilochus accompanied his father Nestor and his brother Thrasymedes to the war (According to Philostratus, Antilochus only arrived in the fifth year of the war, as he was too young to fight in the beginning. He had pleaded with Achilles to convince Nestor to allow him to join). When fighting there resumed after the aborted duel of Paris and Menelaus, Antilochus was first to kill a Trojan captain (named Echepolus). Antilochus was distinguished for his beauty, swiftness of foot, and skill as a charioteer. Though the youngest among the Greek princes, he commanded the Pylians in the war and performed many deeds of valour. He was a favourite of the gods and a close friend of Achilles.

In an early battle, Menelaus ill-advisedly goes to the front lines to face Aeneas, a Trojan prince and a great warrior. Antilochus goes to join Menelaus, causing Aeneas to withdraw rather than fight them both. Later, Menelaus directs Antilochus to lead a fight against the Trojans during a low period for the Greeks. Antilochus obeys and fights well.

=== Death of Patroclus ===
Antilochus was commissioned to tell Achilles of the death of his beloved Patroclus. Ajax believed Antilochus was obviously the best person to share the news, and asked Menelaus to find Antilochus. According to Philostratus, Menelaus believed that Antilochus would be the best choice because Achilles already loved Antilochus. While they lamented Patroclus together, Antilochus made sure that Achilles did not commit suicide. Antilochus held Achilles' hands because he feared that Achilles would cut his own throat. Antilochus' touch, and his relationship with Achilles, served to comfort and distract Achilles from his grief. From this point, Achilles and Antilochus' relationship grew to replace the one between Achilles and Patroclus, but never fully eclipsed the prior relationship.

At the funeral games of Patroclus, Antilochus finished second in the chariot race and last in the foot race. Antilochus entered the chariot race with the slowest horses of any of the heroes, and listened to detailed advice from his father before competing. During the competition, the leading hero, Eumelus, crashed via divine sabotage. Antilochus was later able to slip past Menelaus by aggressively making Menelaus fall back at a point in the track where both of their chariots could not fit side-by-side anymore. When prizes were given, Achilles felt sorry for Eumelus and suggested giving him second place instead of Antilochus. Antilochus objected, saying he would fight Achilles to keep the prize. This made Achilles smile, likely for the first time since Patroclus' death, and Achilles left the prize to Antilochus.

Menelaus then contested Antilochus' prize, stating that Antilochus insulted him by defying him at the narrow point in the race. As their argument grew, Menelaus demanded that Antilochus swear the win came without treachery. Antilochus defused the situation by deferring to Menelaus, stating that the king was older and superior. Still, Antilochus did not admit fault. He and Menelaus then alternated public offers to give their prize to the other man. Later, when Antilochus lost the foot race, he made a speech declaring that the others were all older than him, and thus honored by the gods. He then complimented Achilles, and Achilles doubled Antilochus' prize.

=== Death and afterlife ===
The epic cycle of the Aethiopis details Antilochus' death during the Trojan War. When Antilochus' father, Nestor, was attacked by Memnon, Antilochus sacrificed himself to save Nestor, thus fulfilling an oracle which had warned to "beware of an Ethiopian". Because of the prophecy, Nestor had earlier assigned Antilochus a guardian named Chalcon of Cyparissus. However, Chalcon, instead of protecting him, fell in love with Penthesilea, the Amazon queen, betrayed the Greeks, and was slain by Achilles upon trying to help her.

The Achaeans retrieved Antilochus' body on the battlefield and lamented him. Achilles embraced Antilochus and lamented as well, promising him a glorious funeral and vengeance, in the same way Achilles had honored Patroclus. Achilles then killed Memnon to avenge Antilochus' death, and drove the Trojans back to the gates, where Achilles was killed by Paris. In later accounts, Antilochus was slain by Hector or by Paris in the temple of the Thymbraean Apollo, together with Achilles.

Nestor deeply grieved the death of Antilochus after the war. Peisistratus also mourned Antilochus, even though the brothers had never met.

Antilochus' ashes, along with those of Achilles and Patroclus, were enshrined in a mound on the promontory of Sigeion, where the inhabitants of Ilion offered sacrifice to the dead heroes. The ashes of Achilles and Patroclus were mixed together in one urn, with Antilochus's ashes kept separately but nearby in the mound. Antilochus is described as the companion Achilles honoured most after Patroclus. In the Odyssey, the three are represented as always united in the underworld and walking together in the Asphodel Meadows. However, according to Pausanias, they dwell together on the island of Leuke.

=== Legacy ===
Among the Trojans Antilochus killed were Melanippus, Ablerus, Atymnius, Phalces, Echepolos, and Thoon, although Hyginus records that he only killed two Trojans.

Antilochus left behind in Messenia a son Paeon, whose descendants were among the Neleidae expelled from Messenia by the descendants of Heracles.

== Analysis ==
There are strong parallels between the trio of Achilles, Patroclus, and Hector in the Iliad, and Achilles, Antilochus, and Memnon in the Aethiopis. This has led scholars to wonder if one of the trios was inspired by the other, and which set were the original. Neo-analysts claim that an early version of the Aethiopis inspired the Iliad, and some scholars claim that both epics influenced and contaminated each other.

Some classicists and queer studies scholars interpret Antilochus, Achilles, and Patroclus as in love or as lovers. Their relationships could then be interpreted as successive or triadic. Triadic readings pinpoint the impact that Patroclus' and Antilochus' death had on Achilles, and the trio's unique eternal bond via their burials and afterlives. Other analysis focuses on whether Antilochus even had a close relationship with Achilles in the Iliad resembling that of Achilles and Patroclus. Some readings find Antilochus begins to take Patroclus' place: these focus on how Antilochus was dispatched to inform Achilles of Patroclus' death, how Antilochus physically held Achilles from suicide, and how Antilochus was the first to make Achilles smile thereafter. Other scholars disagree that Antilochus is portrayed as growing significantly close to Achilles in the Iliad, stating that the text could have done much more to show a growing relationship and that Achilles and Patroclus were the only ones to be buried together originally.

Louis Gernet, and later scholars, have claimed that the argument between Menelaus and Antilochus over who earned the second-place prize in their chariot race was one of the earliest examples of a judicial case in Greek history.
