= Nestor (mythology) =

Greek mythological figure

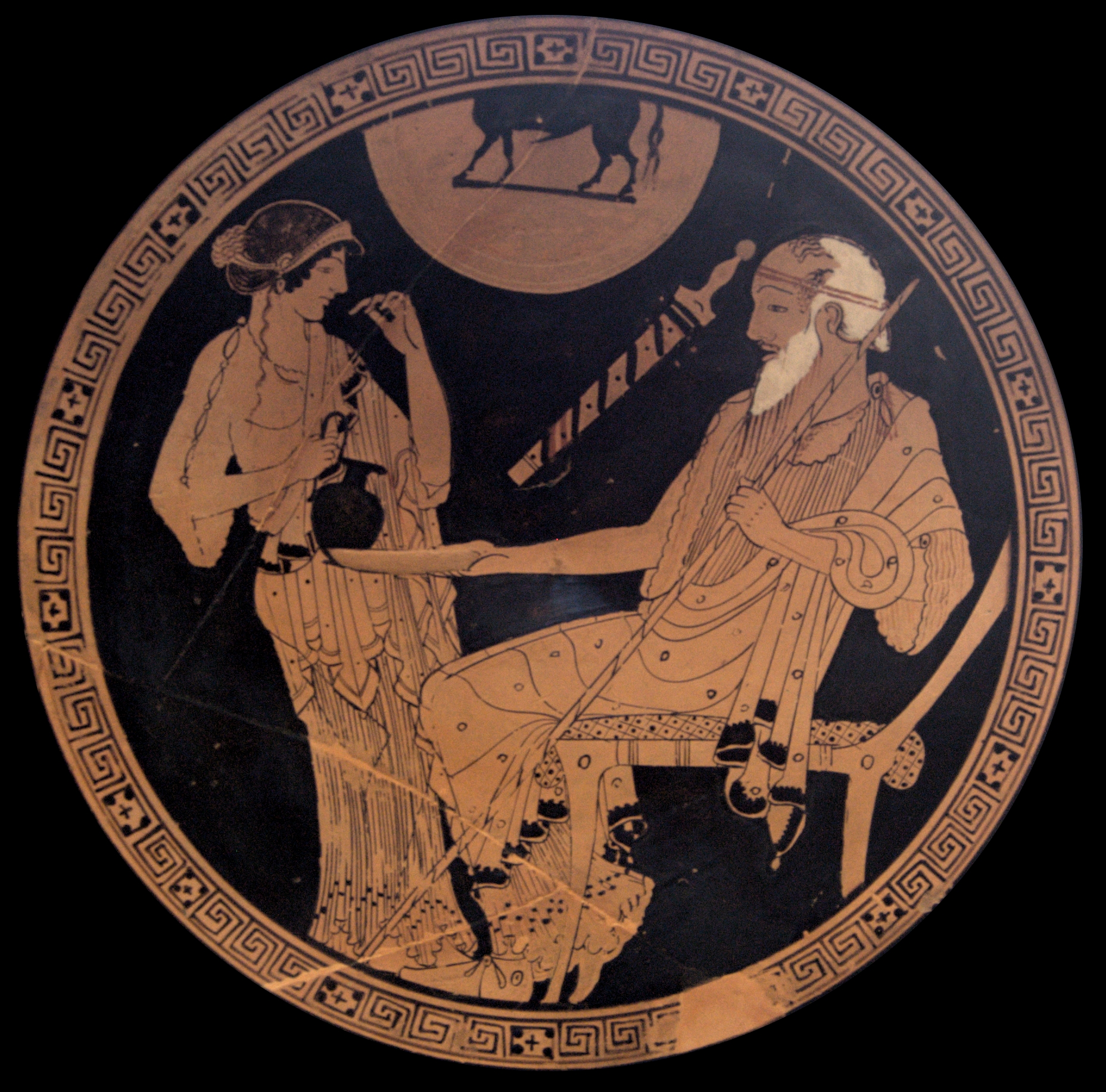
According to some sources, this cup shows Hecamede mixing kykeon for Nestor. Tondo of an Attic red-figure cup, c. 490 BC. From Vulci.

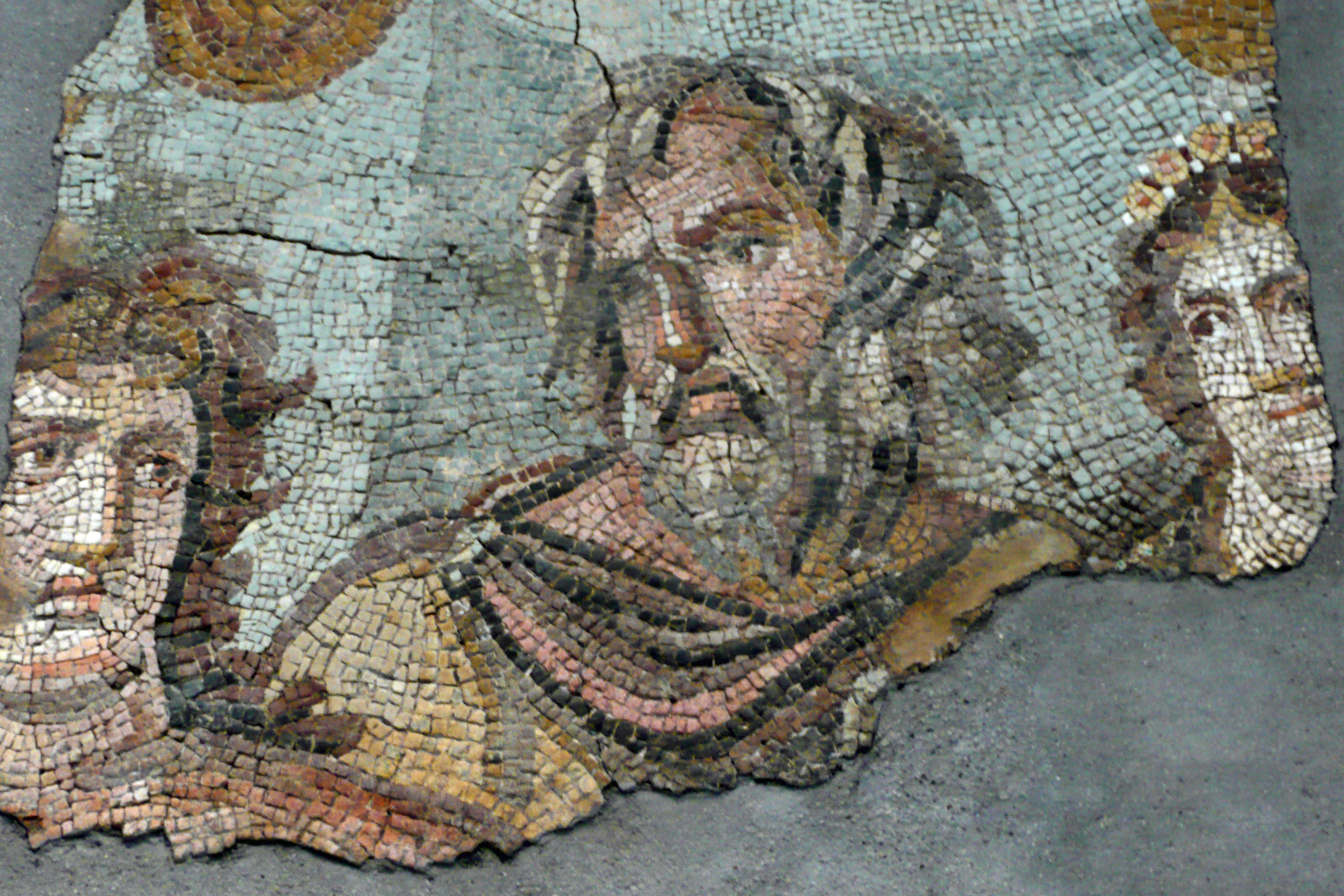
A Roman mosaic probably depicting Nestor, between Achilles and Briseis, 2nd century

In Greek mythology, Nestor of Gerenia (Ancient Greek: Νέστωρ Γερήνιος, romanized: Nestōr Gerēnios) was a legendary king of Pylos. He is a prominent secondary character in Homer's Iliad and Odyssey, where he appears as an elderly warrior who frequently offers advice to the other characters.

The Mycenaean-era palace at Pylos is known as the Palace of Nestor, though there is no evidence that he was an actual person.

== Description ==
In the account of Dares the Phrygian, Nestor was illustrated as "... large, broad and fair. His nose was long and hooked. He was a wise adviser."

== Family ==
Nestor was the son of King Neleus of Pylos and Chloris, daughter of King Amphion of Orchomenus. Otherwise, Nestor's mother was called Polymede.

His wife was either Eurydice or Anaxibia; their children included Peisistratus, Thrasymedes, Pisidice, Polycaste, Perseus, Stratichus, Aretus, Echephron, and Antilochus. In late accounts, Nestor’s daughter Polycaste became the mother of Epicaste by Telemachus.

== Mythology ==
=== Adventures ===
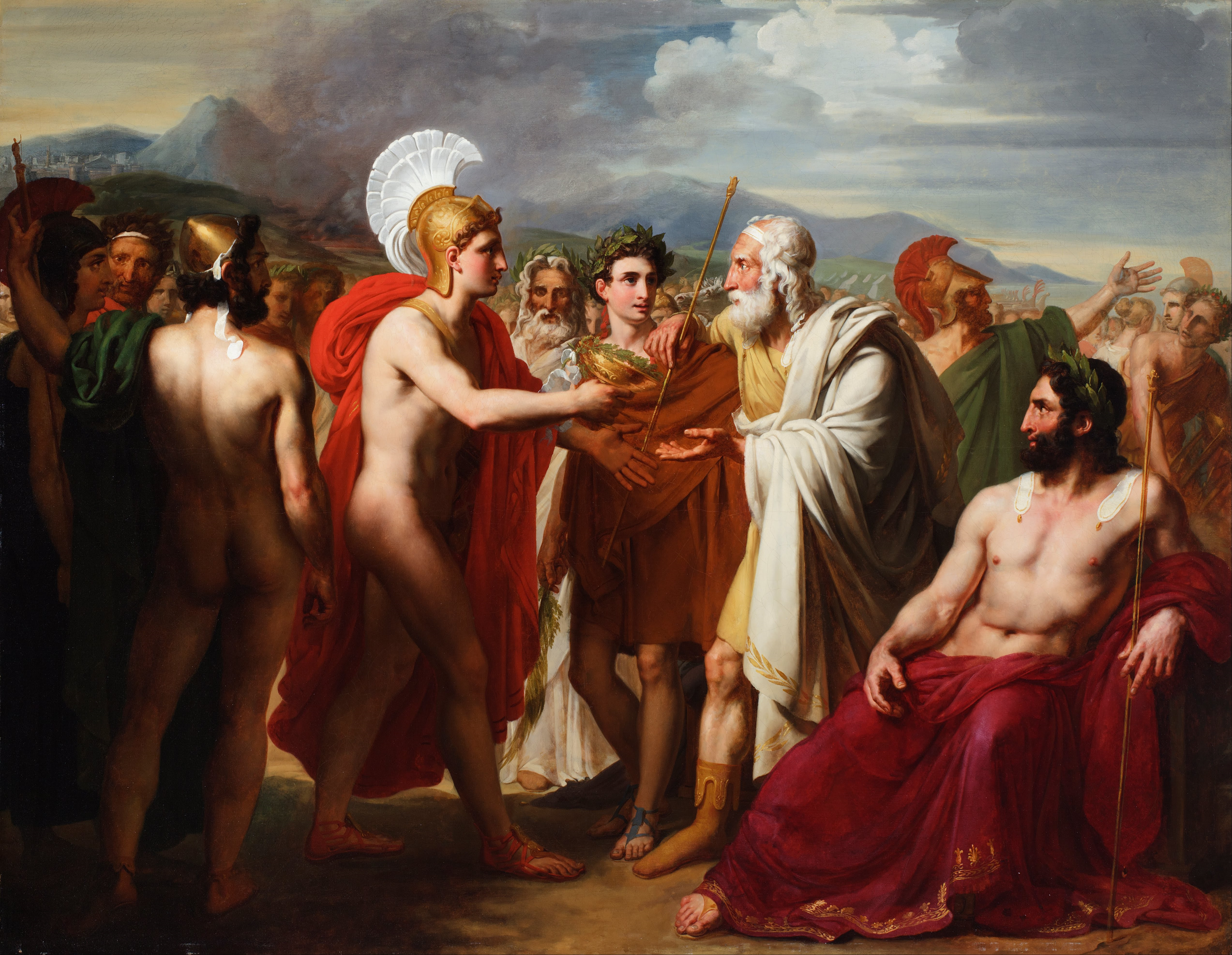
Achilles presenting the prize of Wisdom to Nestor during the funeral games, painting by Charles-Philippe Larivière

Originally from Gerenia, Nestor was an Argonaut, helped to fight the centaurs, and also participated in the hunt for the Calydonian Boar. He became the King of Pylos after Heracles killed Neleus and all of Nestor's brothers. He was said to have lived three generations by favour of Apollo: the years that the god had taken from Chloris and her brothers, he granted to Nestor.

He and his sons, Antilochus and Thrasymedes, fought on the side of the Achaeans in the Trojan War. Though Nestor was already very old when the war began, he was noted for his bravery and speaking abilities. In the Iliad, he often gives advice to the younger warriors and advises Agamemnon and Achilles to reconcile. He is too old to engage in combat himself, but he leads the Pylian troops, riding his chariot; one of his horses is killed by an arrow shot by Paris. He also had a solid gold shield. Homer frequently calls him by the epithet "the Gerenian horseman." At the funeral games of Patroclus, Nestor advises Antilochus on how to win the chariot race. Antilochus was later killed in battle by Memnon.

In the Odyssey, Nestor and those who were part of his army had safely returned to Pylos, having chosen to leave Troy immediately after plundering the city rather than staying behind with Agamemnon to appease Athena, who was angered by the heinous actions of some of the Greeks (probably Ajax the Lesser). Odysseus's son Telemachus travels to Pylos to inquire about the fate of his father. Nestor receives his friend's son, Telemachus, kindly and entertains him lavishly but is unable to furnish any information on his father's fate. Also appearing in the Odyssey are Nestor's wife Eurydice and their remaining living sons: Echephron, Stratichus, Aretus, Thrasymedes and Peisistratus. Nestor also had two daughters named Pisidice and Polycaste.

=== Advice ===
Nestor's advice in the Iliad, while always respected by his listeners due to his age and experience, is always tempered with a subtext of humor at his expense due to his boastfulness, as he is never able to dispense the advice without first spending several paragraphs recounting his own heroic actions in the past when faced with similar circumstances.

In the Odyssey, too, Homer's admiration of Nestor is tempered by some humor at his expense: Telemachus, having returned to Nestor's home from a visit to Helen of Troy and Menelaus (where he has sought further information on his father's fate), urges Peisistratus to let him board his vessel immediately to return home rather than being subjected to a further dose of Nestor's rather overwhelming sense of hospitality. Peisistratus readily agrees, although ruefully stating that his father is bound to be furious when he learns of Telemachus's departure.

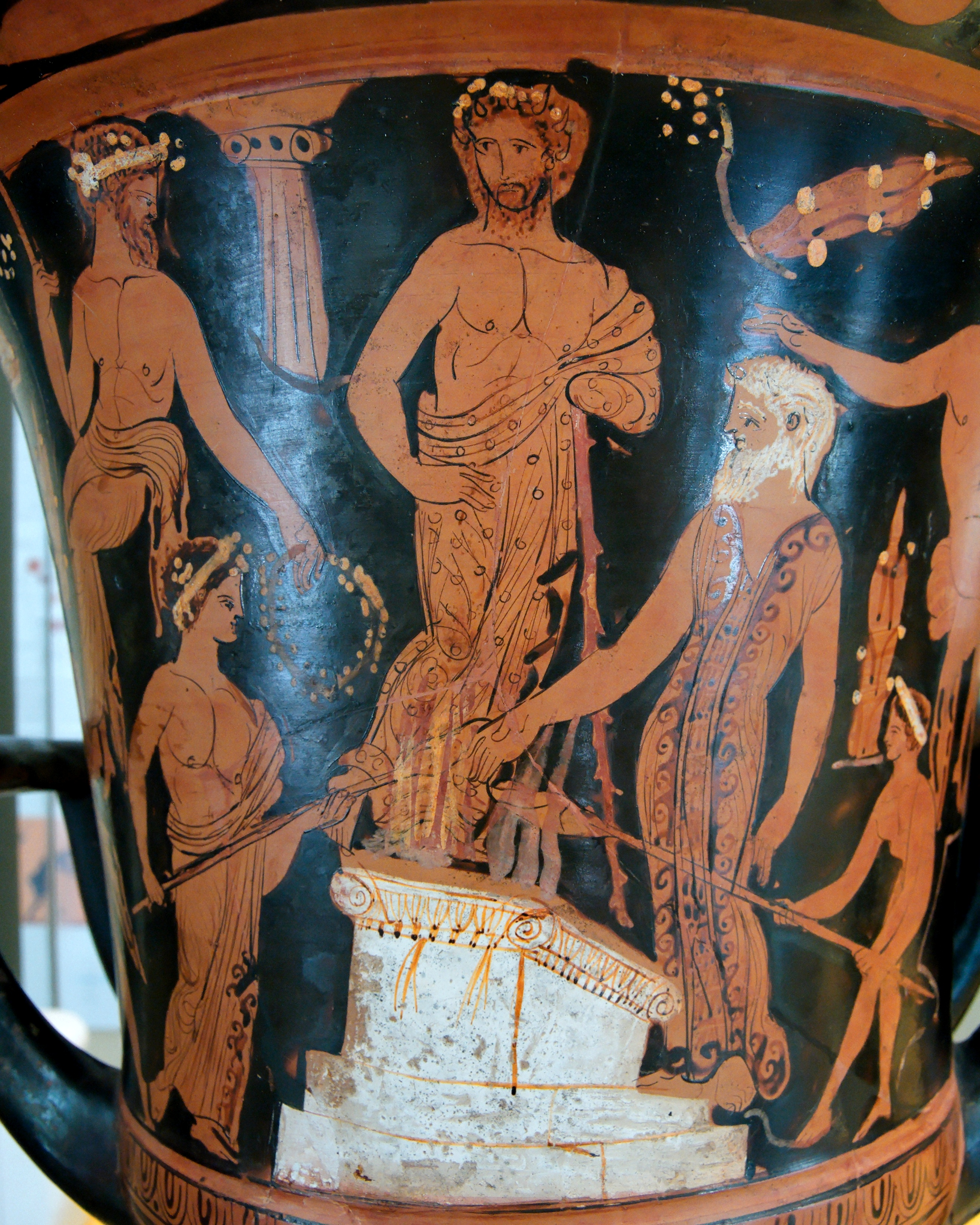
Nestor and his sons sacrifice to Poseidon on the beach at Pylos (Attic red-figure calyx-krater, 400–380 BC).

Nestor's advice in the Iliad has also been interpreted to have sinister undertones. For example, when Patroclus comes to Nestor for advice in Book 11, Nestor persuades him that it is urgent for him to disguise himself as Achilles. Karl Reinhardt argues that this is contrary to what Patroclus really originally wanted—in fact, he is only there to receive information on behalf of Achilles about the wounded Machaon. Reinhardt notes that an "unimportant errand left behind by an all-important one ... Patroclus' role as messenger is crucial and an ironic purpose permeates the encounter."

Homer offers contradictory portrayals of Nestor as a source of advice. On one hand, Homer describes him as a wise man; Nestor repeatedly offers advice to the Achaeans that has been claimed to be anachronistic in Homer's time—for example, arranging the armies by tribes and clans or effectively using chariots in battle. Yet at the same time Nestor's advice is frequently ineffective. Some examples include Nestor accepting without question the dream Zeus plants in Agamemnon in Book 2 and urging the Achaeans to battle, instructing the Achaeans in Book 4 to use spear techniques that in actuality would be disastrous, and in Book 11 giving advice to Patroclus that ultimately leads to his death. Yet Nestor is never questioned and instead is frequently praised.

Hanna Roisman explains that the characters in the Iliad ignore the discrepancy between the quality of Nestor's advice and its outcomes because, in the world of the Iliad, "outcomes are ultimately in the hands of the ever arbitrary and fickle gods ... heroes are not necessarily viewed as responsible when things go awry". In the Iliad, people are judged not necessarily in the modern view of results, but as people. Therefore, Nestor should be viewed as a good counselor because of the qualities he possesses as described in his introduction in Book 1—as a man of "sweet words", a "clear-voiced orator", and whose voice "flows sweeter than honey". These are elements that make up Nestor, and they parallel the elements that Homer describes as part of a good counselor at Iliad 3.150–152. Therefore, "the definition tells us that Nestor, as a good advisor, possesses the three features ... that it designates". Nestor is a good counselor inherently, and the consequences of his advice have no bearing on that, a view that differs from how good counselors are viewed today.

== See also ==
- Nestor's Cup
