= Thrasymedes (mythology) =

Greek mythological characters

In Greek mythology, Thrasymedes (/ˌθræsɪˈmiːdiz/; Ancient Greek: Θρασυμήδης, romanized: Thrasumḗdēs, lit. 'bold of thought') may refer to

- Thrasymedes, son of King Nestor of Pylos and an Achaean warrior.
- Thrasymedes, one of the Suitors of Penelope who came from Dulichium along with other 56 wooers. He, with the other suitors, was slain by Odysseus with the help of Eumaeus, Philoetius, and Telemachus.
