= Danaus (mythology) =

In Greek mythology, Danaus (/ˈdæneɪ.əs/; Ancient Greek: Δαναός Danaós) may refer to the following individuals:

- Danaus, king of Libya and father of the Danaides.
- Danaus, a soldier in the army of the Seven Against Thebes.
- Danaus, father of Argus, one of the Argonauts and builder of the Argo. Otherwise, his son was called the child of Arestor or of Polybus and Argia.
- Danaus, father of Phocus who was counted among the Achaean Leaders.
