= Polybus (mythology) =

Greek mythological characters

In Greek mythology, Polybus (Ancient Greek: Πόλυβος) may refer to the following persons:

- Polybus, father by Argia of Argus, builder of the ship Argo. Others credited Danaus or Arestor to be this Argonaut's father.
- Polybus of Corinth, king of Corinth who was best known for having reared Oedipus.
- Polybus of Sicyon, son of Hermes and king of Sicyon.
- Polybus of Thebes, king of the Egyptian Thebes.
- Polybus (Odyssey), father of Eurymachus, one of the suitors of Penelope.
- Polybus (son of Antenor), son of Antenor.
- Polybus, a skilled Phaeacian craftsman who made a beautiful ball for Halius and Laodamas to play with.
- Polybus, one of the suitors of Penelope who came from Zacynthus along with other 43 wooers. He was killed by Eumaeus, a swineheard and friend of Odysseus.
- Polybus, another suitor of Penelope from Zacynthus. He suffered the same fate as his above namesake.
