= Jason and the Argonauts (miniseries) =

2000 American television miniseries

- Written by: Matthew Faulk
- Directed by: Nick Willing
- Starring: Jason London; Frank Langella; Natasha Henstridge; Derek Jacobi
- Music by: Simon Boswell
- Country of origin: United States
- Original language: English

Production
- Producer: Dyson Lovell
- Cinematography: Sergei Kozlov
- Editor: Sean Barton
- Running time: 180 minutes (2 episodes)
- Production companies: Hallmark Entertainment; Panfilm
- Budget: $30,000,000

Original release
- Network: NBC
- Release: May 7, 2000

Jason and the Argonauts, (also known as Jason and the Golden Fleece) is a 2000 American two-part television miniseries directed by Nick Willing and produced by Hallmark Entertainment. It is based on the Greek myth of Jason and the Argonauts.

== Plot ==
Led by Pelias, brother of Iolcus's King, Aeson, soldiers invade the city of Iolcus. Inside the temple Pelias goes to embrace his brother but produces a dagger and kills him during the embrace. This is witnessed by Aeson's wife Polymele and his son Jason. Pelias intends to do the same to Jason but one of the guards rescues the boy and takes him out of the palace through a secret tunnel.

It is then revealed that this is a memory, experienced as a nightmare by an older Jason, who awakes. He does not remember who he is, so the centaur Chiron, who has raised Jason, reveals to him that he is the true heir of Iolcus. Then, he decides to take revenge on Pelias and recover his throne, so he goes to Iolcus, where he is ordered by his uncle to retrieve the Golden Fleece as a condition to give him the throne.

He recruits a crew from the simple folk of Iolcus, including shepherds and farmers. He is joined by Hercules, Orpheus, Atalanta and the brothers Castor and Pollux. Acastus stows away on the ship, the Argo. The Argonauts run aground on a strange island in the middle of the ocean that is actually the sea god Poseidon. In the ensuing storm, they lose the map. The crew make their way to the Isle of Lemnos, an island of warrior women (Amazons), to recover from the experience and repair the ship. The men pleasure themselves with the women while their ship is repaired (except Orpheus and Atalanta) and Jason sleeps with the queen Hypsipyle. Atalanta discovers that the women have killed all the men on the island and are planning to sacrifice the crew. She warns Jason, and the Argonauts flee the island.

The crew become rebellious and Jason has Zetes, a young man with brilliant vision, see the stars and find their route to Tabletop Island, where they find Phineus. They are attacked by the Harpies - the winged monsters that torment Phineus - and kill them. In return, Phineus tells them the Golden Fleece is in Colchis. Meanwhile, on Colchis, the princess Medea has visions of the crew and her brother Aspyrtes goes out to find them. Jason finds the ship wrecked and rescues Aspyrtes. They approach the "Dark Rocks" and send a dove through before sailing through themselves.

The Argo docks at Colchis and Jason goes ashore with Aspyrtes, Castor and Pollux. Hera asks Eros to shoot Medea so she falls in love with Jason. King Aeëtes wants Jason killed but Medea convinces him to face the Bulls of Colchis (sometimes called the Menaian Bull). Medea gives Jason magic oil that protects Jason from the bull's fiery-breath. Jason yokes the bull and ploughs a field and sows it with dragon's teeth. Warriors sprout up from the earth, and Jason tricks them into attacking each other. Medea tells Jason she must go with the Fleece. Aspyrtes overhears this and sends soldiers out after them.

The other Argonauts debate whether to leave or not. Hercules, Orpheus and Argos sail the ship around the island to make it seem as if they have left while the others hide in the water and then join Jason and Medea. When the soldiers attack, Medea kills her brother and leads them to the Fleece which is guarded by a dragon. Some Argonauts are killed before Jason sets a noose around the dragon's neck and makes it fall off a precipice. They take the Fleece and sail away from Colchis.

Acastus has been wounded and Medea uses magic to heal him. Atalanta confesses she loves Jason but he says he will marry Medea. She has a vision of her father's death and the two kiss. Zeus attempts to seduce Medea but she says she loves Jason, even when he pulls out Eros's arrow. The ship arrives back in Iolcus and Jason learns his mother killed herself, believing him and Acastus to be dead. They rest in the bay and Acastus steals the Fleece and goes into town. Pelias kills him and takes the Fleece. Medea then goes and says he will marry her. Jason and the others sneak into the palace through the secret tunnel. Argos is killed by one of the guards. Pelias tries to kill Jason but is stabbed by his own knife.

To cremate the dead Argos, his corpse is burned with the Argo. Then Jason marries Medea and they live as King and Queen of Iolcus.

== Cast ==
- Jason London as Jason
- Frank Langella as King Aeëtes
- Natasha Henstridge as Hypsipyle
- Derek Jacobi as Phineus
- Olivia Williams as Hera
- Angus Macfadyen as Zeus
- Dennis Hopper as Pelias
- Jolene Blalock as Medea
- James Callis as Aspyrtes
- Brian Thompson as Hercules
- Adrian Lester as Orpheus
- Ciarán Hinds as King Aeson
- Diana Kent as Polymele
- David Calder as Argos
- Mark Lewis Jones as Mopsus
- Hugh Quarshie as Chiron, The Centaur
- Olga Sosnovska as Atalanta
- Kieran O'Brien as Actor
- Tom Harper as Acastus
- Omid Djalili as Castor
- John Sharian as Pollux
- Rhys Miles Thomas as Zetes, Son of Idas
- Mark Folan Deasy as Iphicles
- Elliot Levey as Canthus
- Xavier Anderson as Phanos
- Charles Cartmell as Laertes, Father of Odysseus
- Dodger Phillips as Tiphys, Helmsman
- Peter Gevisser as Butes
- Norman Roberts as Echion
- Greg Hicks as Priest
- Adam Cooper as Eros
- Mickey Churchill (credited as Micky Churchill) as Boy Jason
- John Bennett as Idas, The Mapmaker
- Andrew Tansey as Aeëtes' 1st General
- Richard Bonehill as Aeëtes' 2nd General
- Freda Dowie as Hera as Old Peasant Woman
- Zeta Graff as Hypsipyle's 1st General
- Zoë Eeles (credited as Zoe Eeles) as Actor's Lemnite Girl
- Alit Kreiz as High Priestess
- Andrew Scarborough as Aeson's Soldier
- Alan Stocks as Pelias' Bodyguard
- Suzanne Harbison as Mopsus' Lemnite Girl
- Freya Archard (uncredited) as Zetes' Lemnite Girl
- Joseph Gatt (uncredited) as Atlas
- Mike Savva (uncredited) as Pelias' Bodyguard

== Soundtrack ==
In 2010, Perseverance Records released the soundtrack album with music by Simon Boswell.

== See also ==
- List of historical drama films
- List of films featuring Hercules
- Greek mythology in popular culture
- Jason and the Argonauts (1963 film)
