= Argonauts =

Band of heroes in Greek mythology

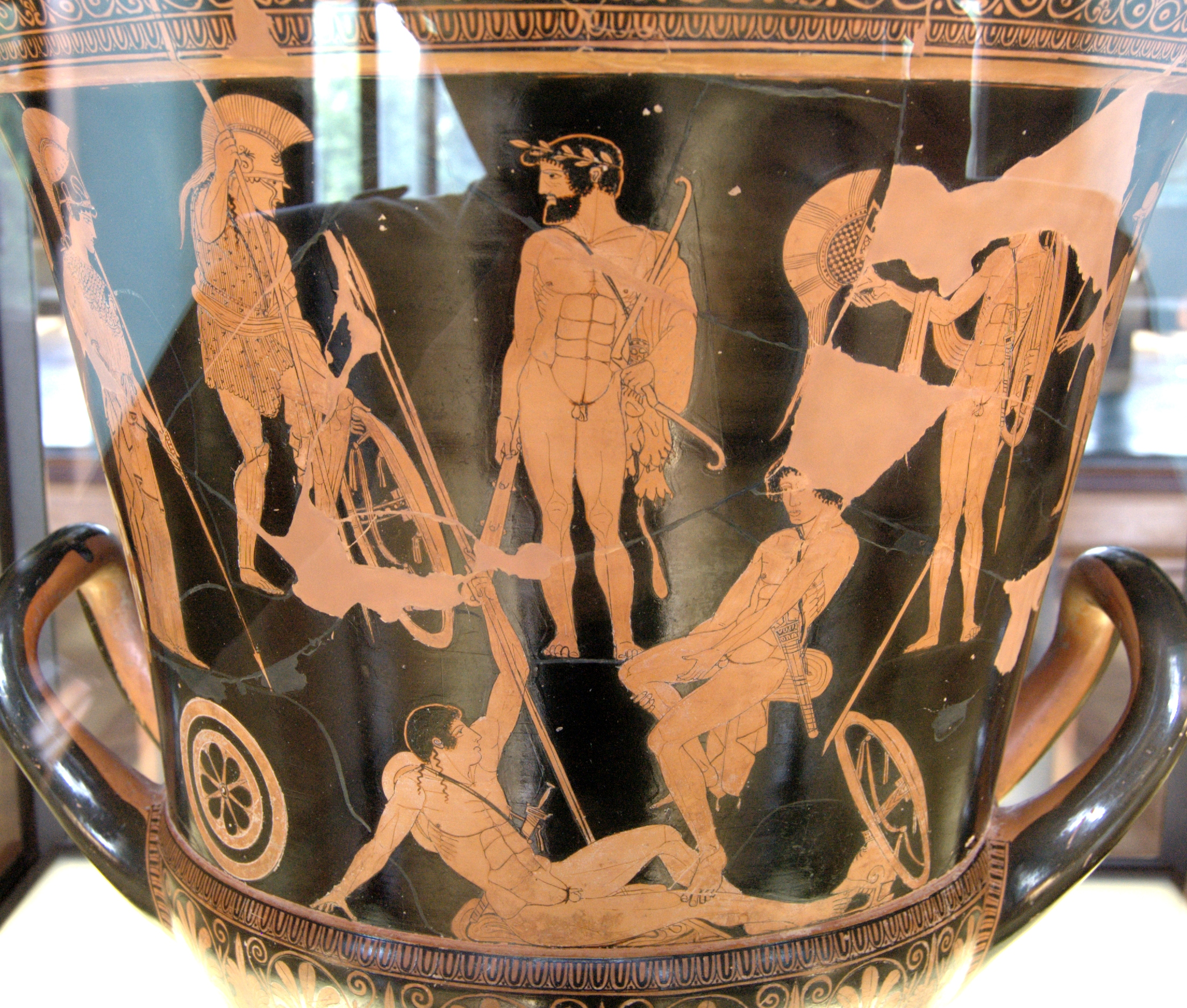
Gathering of the Argonauts, Attic red-figure krater, 460–450 BC (Louvre G 341)

The Argonauts (/ˈɑːrɡənɔːt/ AR-gə-nawt; Ancient Greek: Ἀργοναῦται, romanized: Argonaûtai, lit. 'Argo sailors') were a band of heroes in Greek mythology, who in the years before the Trojan War (around 1300 BC) accompanied Jason to Colchis in his quest to find the Golden Fleece. Their name comes from their ship, Argo, named after its builder, Argus. They were sometimes called Minyans, after a prehistoric tribe in the area.

== Mythology ==
=== The Golden Fleece ===
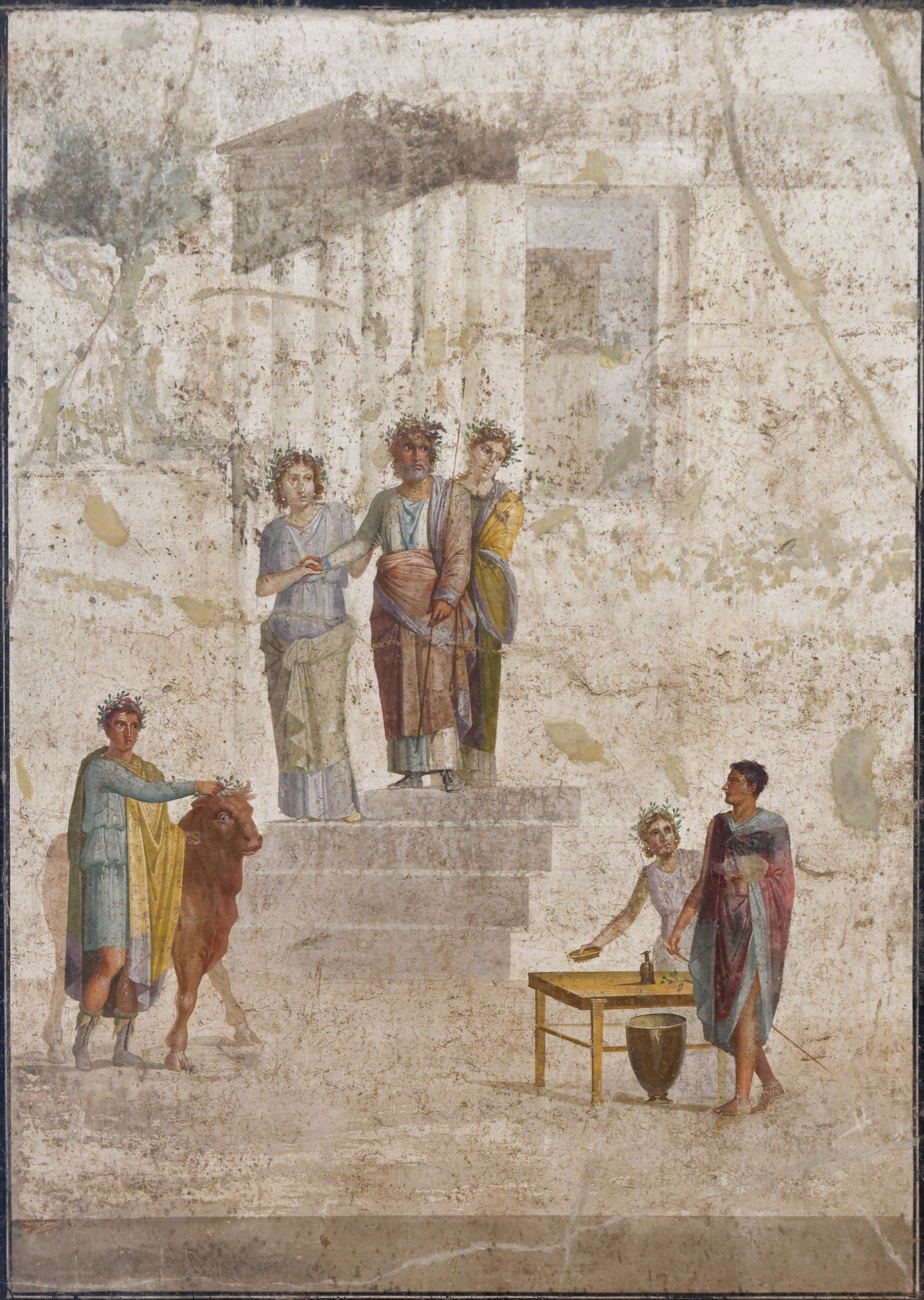
Pelias recognises young Jason by his missing sandal (fresco from Pompeii, 1st-century AD)

After the death of King Cretheus, the Aeolian Pelias usurped the throne from his half-brother Aeson and became king of Iolcus in Thessaly (near the modern city of Volos). Because of this unlawful act, an oracle warned him that a descendant of Aeolus would seek revenge. Pelias put to death every prominent descendant of Aeolus he could, but spared Aeson because of the pleas of their mother Tyro. Instead, Pelias kept Aeson prisoner and forced him to renounce his inheritance. Aeson married Alcimede, who bore him a son named Jason. Pelias intended to kill the baby at once, but Alcimede summoned her kinswomen to weep over him as if he were stillborn. She faked a burial and smuggled the baby to Mount Pelion. He was raised by the centaur Chiron, the trainer of heroes.

When Jason was 20 years old, an oracle ordered him to dress as a Magnesian and head to the Iolcan court. While traveling Jason lost his sandal crossing the muddy Anauros river while helping an old woman (Hera in disguise). The goddess was angry with King Pelias for killing his stepgrandmother Sidero after she had sought refuge in Hera's temple.

Another oracle warned Pelias to be on his guard against a man with one shoe. Pelias was presiding over a sacrifice to Poseidon with several neighboring kings in attendance. Among the crowd stood a tall youth in leopard skin with only one sandal. Pelias recognized that Jason was his nephew. He could not kill him because prominent kings of the Aeolian family were present. Instead, he asked Jason: "What would you do if an oracle announced that one of your fellow-citizens were destined to kill you?" Jason replied that he would send him to go and fetch the Golden Fleece, not knowing that Hera had put those words in his mouth.

Jason learned later that Pelias was being haunted by the ghost of Phrixus. Phrixus had fled from Orchomenus riding on a divine ram to avoid being sacrificed and took refuge in Colchis where he was later denied proper burial. According to an oracle, Iolcus would never prosper unless his ghost was taken back in a ship, together with the golden ram's fleece. This fleece now hung from a tree in the grove of the Colchian Ares, guarded night and day by a dragon that never slept. Pelias swore before Zeus that he would give up the throne at Jason's return while expecting that Jason's attempt to steal the Golden Fleece would be a fatal enterprise. However, Hera acted in Jason's favour during the perilous journey.

=== The crew of Argo ===
There is no definite list of the Argonauts. H. J. Rose explains this was because "an Argonautic ancestor was an addition to even the proudest of pedigrees." The following list is collated from several lists given in ancient sources.

Crew	Sources					Appearance	Abode	Parentage and Notes	
Crew	Names	Apollonius	Pseudo-Apollodorus	Valerius	Hyginus	Appearance	Abode	Parentage and Notes	Orphic
Beginning of Journey
Acastus	✓	✓	✓	✓	✓	7	Pherae or Iolcus	son of Pelias and Anaxibia or Phylomache; he joined the Argonauts as a volunteer and at his own accord	
Actor		✓		✓		4	Pellene, Peloponnesus	son of Hippasus	
Admetus	✓	✓	✓	✓	✓	7	Pherae	son of Pheres and Periclymene; his flocks they say were pastured by Apollo	
Aethalides	✓		✓	✓	✓	5	Larissa, Thessaly	son of Hermes and Eupolemeia	
Amphiaraus		✓		✓*		4	Argos	son of Oicles and Hypermnestra; *he could fit the description of Hyginus "...Thestius' daughter, an Argive." which could be interpreted as Amphiaraus, son of Oicles and Hypermnestra, Thestius' daughter and an Argive.	
Amphidamas or Iphidamas	✓		✓	✓	✓	5	Tegea, Arcadia	son of Aleus and Cleobule	
Amphion	✓		✓	✓	✓	5	Pellene, Peloponnesus	son of Hyperasius and Hypso or of Hippasus	
Ancaeus	✓		✓	✓	✓	6	Parthenia or Samos	son of Poseidon and Astypalaea or Althaea	
Ancaeus	✓	✓	✓	✓	✓	7	Tegea, Arcadia	son of Lycurgus and Eurynome or Cleophyle; he went clad in the skin of a Maenalian bear and wielded a huge two-edged battleaxe	
Areius	✓				✓	3	Argos	son of Bias and Pero	
Argus	✓		✓		✓	5	Argos	son of Arestor or Polybus and Argia or Danaus; builder of Argo	
Armenus						1	Armenium, Thessaly	-	
Ascalaphus		✓				3	Orchomenus	son of Ares and Astyoche; later one of the Suitors of Helen and led the Orchomenians in the Trojan War.	
Asclepius				✓		2	Tricca	son of Apollo and Coronis or Arsinoe	
Asterion or Asterius	✓	✓	✓	✓	✓	7	Peiresiae, Thessaly	son of Cometes and Antigona or of Hyperasius; he was probably conflated by Hyginus with Asterius below when saying Asterion as the son of Hyperasius.	
Asterius or Asterion or Deucalion	✓		✓*	✓	✓	5	Pellene, Peloponnesus	son of Hyperasius and Hypso or of Hippasus; in the account of Valerius, Deucalion was the name of the brother of Amphion instead of Asterius.	
Atalanta		✓				3	Arcadia	daughter of Schoeneus or Iasus; Atalanta is included on the list by Pseudo-Apollodorus, but Apollonius claims that Jason forbade her because she was a woman and could cause strife in the otherwise all-male crew. Other sources state that she was asked, but refused.	
Augeas	✓	✓		✓	✓	6	Pisa, Elis	son of Helios and Nausidame, or Eleios, or Poseidon or Phorbas and Hyrmine	
Azorus						1	-	the helmsman of Argo according to Hesychius of Alexandria he could be the same as the Azorus mentioned by Stephanus as founder of the city Azorus in Pelagonia.	
Buphagus						1	-	-	
Butes	✓	✓	✓	✓	✓	7	Athens (Cecropia)	son of Teleon	
Caeneus		✓		✓		4	Gyrton	father of Coronus	
Calaïs	✓	✓	✓	✓	✓	7	Thrace	son of Boreas and Oreithyia	
Canthus	✓		✓*	✓	✓	6	Chalcis or Cerinthus, Euboea	son of Canethus or Abas; *name appeared in some notes of the book	
Castor	✓	✓	✓	✓	✓	7	Sparta	son of Tyndareus or Zeus and Leda	
Cepheus	✓	✓	✓	✓	✓	7	Tegea, Arcadia	son of Aleus and Cleobule	
Cius						1	-	-	
Clymenus			✓			1	Phylace, Thessaly	possibly son of Phylacus and Clymene as the brother of Iphiclus	
Clytius	✓			✓		3	Oechalia	son of Eurytus and Antiope	
Coronus	✓			✓	✓	5	Thessaly	son of Caeneus	
Deucalion				✓		2	Crete	son of Minos and Pasiphae	
Echion	✓		✓	✓	✓	6	Alope	son of Hermes and Antianeira or Laothoe	
Eneus					✓	1		son of Caeneus	
Erginus	✓	✓	✓	✓	✓	7	Miletus, Caria	son of Poseidon	
Eribotes	✓		✓	✓		4	Opus	son of Teleon	
Erytus or Eurytus	✓	✓	✓	✓	✓	6	Alope	son of Hermes and Antianeira or Laothoe	
Euphemus	✓	✓	✓	✓	✓	7	Taenarus, Peloponesse	son of Poseidon and Europe	
Euryalus		✓				3	Argos	son of Mecisteus	
Eurydamas	✓			✓	✓	5	Ctimene, Dolopia	son of Ctimenus or of Irus and Demonassa	
Eurymedon				✓		1	Phlius	son of Dionysus and Ariadne	
Eurytion	✓		✓	✓	✓	5	Opus	son of Irus and Demonassa or Actor	
Glaucus						1	-	-	
Heracles	✓	✓	✓	✓	✓	7	Thebes	son of Zeus and Alcmene	
Hippalcimus				✓		1	Pisa, Elis	son of Pelops and Hippodamia	
Hylas	✓	✓	✓	✓	✓	6	Oechalia or Argos	son of Theiodamas and Menodice	
Ialmenus		✓				2	Orchomenus	son of Ares and Astyoche	
Idas	✓	✓	✓	✓	✓	7	Messenia	son of Aphareus and Arene	
Idmon	✓		✓	✓	✓	6	Argos	son of Apollo or Abas or by Cyrene or Antianeira or of Asteria or of Ampycus	
Iolaus				✓		2	Argos	son of Iphicles and Automedusa	
Iphiclus	✓		✓	✓	✓	5	Phylace, Thessaly	son of Phylacus and Clymene	
Iphiclus	✓	✓		✓		5	Aetolia	son of Thestius and Leucippe	
Iphis			✓			2	Mycenae	son of Sthenelus	
Iphis						1	Argos	son of Alector	
Iphitos	✓			✓		3	Oechalia	son of Eurytus and Antiope	
Iphitos	✓	✓	✓	✓	✓	6	Phocis or Peloponnesse	son of Naubolus or Hippasus	
Jason	✓	✓	✓	✓	✓	7	Iolcus	son of Aeson and Alcimede	
Laërtes		✓				3	Cephalonia	son of Arcesius and Chalcomedusa, father of Odysseus	
Laocoon	✓			✓		3	Calydon	son of Porthaon and half-brother of Oeneus; tutor of Meleager	
Leitus		✓				2	Boeotia	son of Alector (Alectryon) and Polybule or of Lacritus and Cleobule or an earthborn, thus a son of Gaea	
Leodocus or Laodocus	✓		✓		✓	4	Argos	son of Bias and Pero	
Lynceus	✓	✓	✓	✓	✓	7	Messenia	son of Aphareus and Arene	
Melampus						1	Pylos	son of Poseidon	
Meleager	✓	✓	✓	✓	✓	7	Calydon	son of Oeneus and Althaea	
Menoetius	✓	✓	✓	✓	✓	6	Opus	son of Actor	
Mopsus	✓		✓	✓	✓	6	Titaressa	son of Ampyx and Chloris or Aregonis	
Nauplius	✓		✓	✓	✓	6	Nauplia	son of Clytoneus or of Poseidon and Amymone	
Neleus				✓		2	Pylos	son of Poseidon or Hippocoon	
Nestor			✓			2	Pylos	son of Neleus and Chloris	
Oileus	✓		✓	✓	✓	6	Narycea, Opus	son of Hodoedocus (Leodocus) and Agrianome	
Orpheus	✓	✓	✓	✓	✓	7	Bistonian Pieria, Thrace	son of Calliope and Oeagrus	
Palaemon or Palaimonius	✓	✓		✓	✓	6	Olenus, Aulis or Calydon	son of Hephaestus or Lernus or Aetolus	
Peleus	✓	✓	✓	✓	✓	7	Phthia	son of Aeacus and Endeis. Father of Achilles	
Peneleos		✓				3	Boeotia	son of Hippalmus and Asterope	
Periclymenus	✓	✓	✓	✓	✓	7	Pylos	son of Chloris and Neleus, son of Poseidon	
Phalerus	✓		✓	✓	✓	6	Athens, Attica	son of Alcon	
Phanus		✓				3	Crete	son of Dionysus and Ariadne	
Philoctetes			✓	✓		3	Meliboea	son of Poeas and Methone or Demonassa	
Phlias	✓		✓	✓	✓	5	Araethyrea, Phlius	son of Dionysus and Ariadne	
Phocus				✓		2	Magnesia	son of Caeneus and brother of Priasus	
Pirithous				✓		2	Larissa	son of Ixion or Zeus by Dia	
Poeas		✓				3	Meliboea	son of Thaumacus and father of Philoctetes	
Pollux	✓	✓	✓	✓	✓	7	Sparta	son of Zeus and Leda	
Polyphemus	✓	✓	✓	✓	✓	7	Larisa	son of Elatus and Hippea; one of the Lapiths	
Priasus				✓		2	Magnesia	son of Caeneus and brother of Phocus	
Staphylus		✓				2	Phlius or Crete	son of Dionysus and Ariadne	
Talaus	✓		✓		✓	4	Argos	son of Bias and Pero	
Telamon	✓	✓	✓	✓	✓	6	Salamis	son of Aeacus and Endeis. Father of Ajax the Great and Teucer	
Thersanon				✓		1	Andros	son of Helios and Leucothea/Leucothoe	
Theseus		✓		✓		3	Troezen	son of Poseidon or Aegeus by Aethra; slayer of the Minotaur; other Theseus myths preclude his joining the Argonauts	
Tiphys	✓	✓	✓	✓	✓	7	Thespia, Boeotia or Elis	son of Hagnias or of Phorbas and Hyrmine. According to various accounts, he is the helmsman of the Argo.	
Tydeus			✓			1	Calydon	son of Oeneus and father of Diomedes	
Zetes	✓	✓	✓	✓	✓	6	Thrace	son of Boreas and Oreithyia	
TOTAL	55	46	51*	66*	51	50	85		
During or After the Journey
Argus				✓		1	Colchis	sons of Phrixus and Chalciope; they joined the crew only after being rescued by the Argonauts: the four had been stranded on a desert island not far from Colchis, from where they initially sailed with an intent to reach their father's homeland. However, Argus is not to be confused with the other Argus, son of Arestor or Polybus, constructor and eponym of the ship Argo and member of the crew from the beginning.	
Cytissorus				✓		1	Colchis	sons of Phrixus and Chalciope; they joined the crew only after being rescued by the Argonauts: the four had been stranded on a desert island not far from Colchis, from where they initially sailed with an intent to reach their father's homeland. However, Argus is not to be confused with the other Argus, son of Arestor or Polybus, constructor and eponym of the ship Argo and member of the crew from the beginning.	
Melas				✓		1	Colchis	sons of Phrixus and Chalciope; they joined the crew only after being rescued by the Argonauts: the four had been stranded on a desert island not far from Colchis, from where they initially sailed with an intent to reach their father's homeland. However, Argus is not to be confused with the other Argus, son of Arestor or Polybus, constructor and eponym of the ship Argo and member of the crew from the beginning.	
Phrontis				✓		1	Colchis	sons of Phrixus and Chalciope; they joined the crew only after being rescued by the Argonauts: the four had been stranded on a desert island not far from Colchis, from where they initially sailed with an intent to reach their father's homeland. However, Argus is not to be confused with the other Argus, son of Arestor or Polybus, constructor and eponym of the ship Argo and member of the crew from the beginning.	
Autolycus	✓		✓	✓		3	Thessaly	sons of Deimachus	
Demoleon or Deileon	✓		✓	✓		3	Thessaly	sons of Deimachus	
Phlogius	✓		✓	✓		3	Thessaly	sons of Deimachus	
Phronius				✓		1	Thessaly	sons of Deimachus	
Medea	✓	✓	✓	✓	✓	5	Colchis	daughter of Aeetes; joined when the Fleece was recovered	

In Pindar's Pythian Odes, the following heroes are either named or implied as part of the Argonauts: Jason, Heracles, Castor, Polydeuces, Euphemus, Periclymenus, Echion, Erytus, Orpheus, Zetes, Calais and Mopsus.

Several more names are discoverable from other sources:

- Amyrus (son of Poseidon), eponym of a Thessalian city, is given by Stephanus of Byzantium as "one of the Argonauts"; he is otherwise said to have been a son of Poseidon and to have given his name to the river Amyrus.
- Philammon, son of Apollo was also reported one of the Argonauts.

== The journey ==
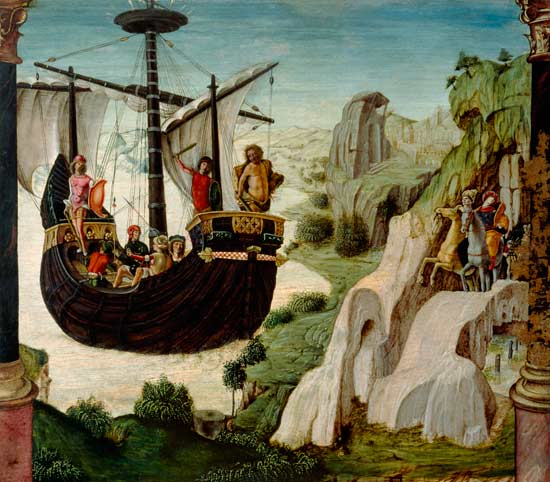
Escape of the Argonauts from Colchis (c. 1500–1530), painting by Lorenzo Costa

Jason, along with his other 49 crew-mates, sailed off from Iolcus to Colchis to fetch the golden fleece.

=== Women of Lemnos ===
The Argonauts first stopped at Lemnos where they learned that all the males had been murdered. The reason of which was as follows: for several years, the women did not honor and make offerings to Aphrodite and because of her anger, she visited them with a noisome smell. Therefore, their spouses took captive women from the neighboring country of Thrace and bedded with them. Dishonored, all the Lemnian women, except Hypsipyle, were instigated by the same goddess in conspiring to kill their fathers and husbands. They then deposed King Thoas, who should have died along with the whole tribe of men, but was secretly spared by his daughter Hypsipyle. She put Thoas on board a ship which a storm carried to the island of Taurica.

In the meantime, the Argonauts sailing along, the guardian of the harbour Iphinoe saw them and announced their coming to Hypsipyle, the new queen. Polyxo who by virtue of her middle age, gave advice that she should put them under obligation to the gods of hospitality and invite them to a friendly reception. Hypsipyle fell in love with their captain Jason. They had sons, Euneus and Nebrophonus or Deipylus. The other Argonauts consorted with the Lemnian women, and their descendants were called Minyans, since some among them had previously emigrated from Minyan Orchomenus to Iolcus. (Later, these Minyans were driven out from the island and came to Lacedaemon). The Lemnian women gave the names of the Argonauts to the children they had conceived by them. Delayed many days there, they were chided by Hercules and departed.

But later, when the other women learned that Hypsipyle had spared her father, they tried to kill her. She fled from them, but pirates captured and took her to Thebes where they sold her as a slave to King Lycus. (Hypsipyle reappeared years later, when the Argives marching against Thebes learned from her the way to a spring in Nemea, where she served as nurse to King Lycurgus' son Opheltes.) Her son Euneus later became king of Lemnos. In order to purify the island from blood guilt, he ordered that all Lemnian hearth-fires be put off for nine days and a new fire be brought on a ship from Apollo's altar in Delos.

=== Island of Cyzicus ===
After Lemnos, the Argonauts made their second stop at Bear Mountain, an island of the Propontis shaped like a bear. The locals, called the Doliones, were all descended from Poseidon. Their king Cyzicus, son of Eusorus, who had just gotten married, received the Argonauts with generous hospitality and decided to have a huge party with them. During that event, the king tried to tell Jason not to go to the eastern side of the island, but he got distracted by Heracles, and forgot to tell Jason.

The Argonauts left the island, and encountered winds that pushed them towards a landmass that was, unbeknownst to them, the island they had just exited. The Argonauts then disembarked at night, causing the Doliones to mistakenly think that they were Euboean attackers and to fight them. The Argonauts inflicted many casualties, with Jason himself killing Cyzicus. The new day reveals their identities to one another; a funeral is held, and Cleite, Cyzicus's wife, kills herself.

=== Lost comrades ===
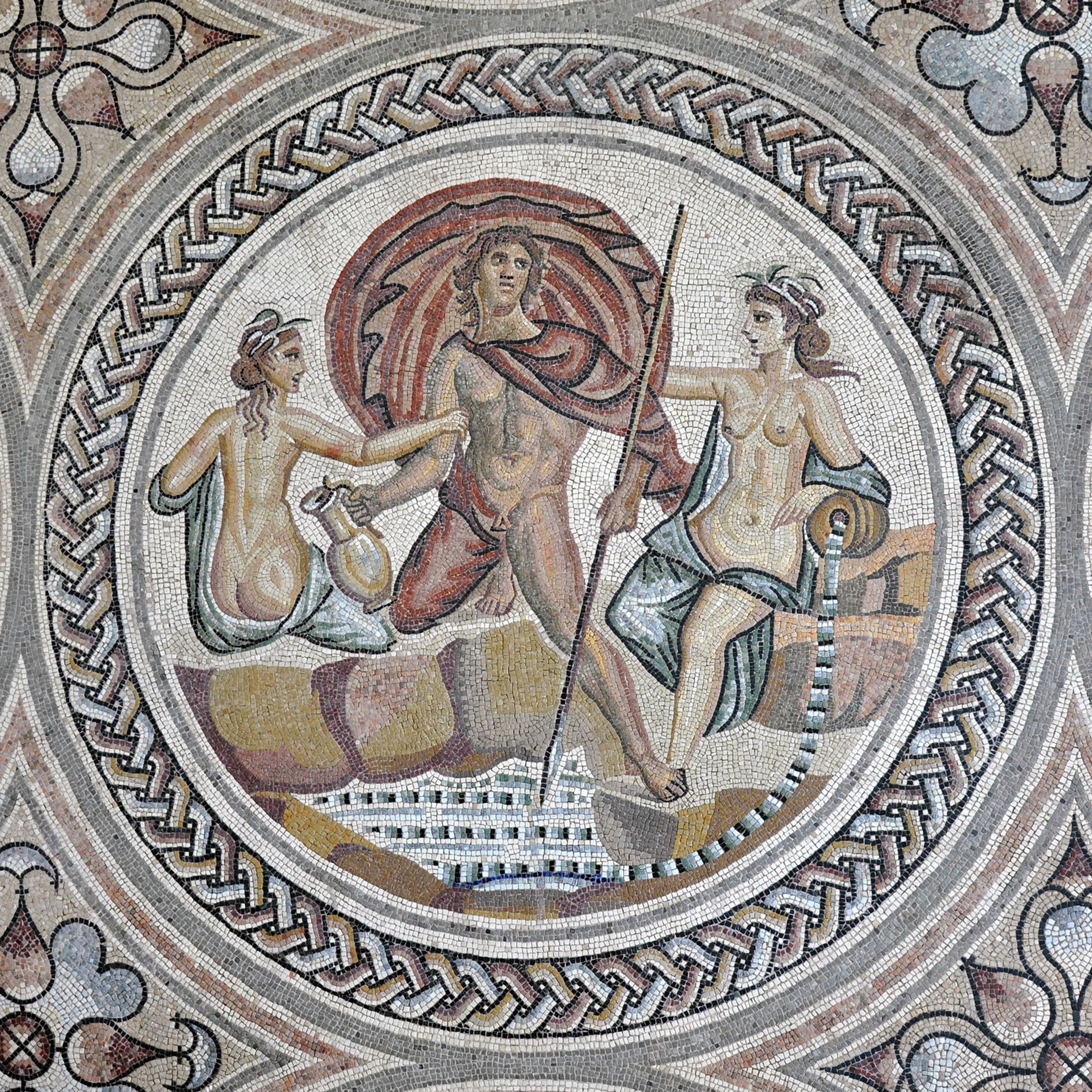
Hylas and the nymphs, Gallo-Roman mosaic (3rd century)

The Argonauts left the island again and made their way to Mysia, where they lost Heracles, Hylas, and Polyphemus. Hylas went to collect water and was carried away by a spring nymph (or multiple, depending on the version) on account of his beauty. Polyphemus heard him cry out and informed Heracles, but the pair were unable to locate Hylas. The following morning, the ship left without the other Argonauts being aware of the absence of their companions. Polyphemus would eventually establish the city of Cius in Mysia, and Hylas would marry the nymph who captured him. Ancient sources record multiple version of Heracles's involvement in the Argo's voyage. He was sometimes not counted amongst the Argonauts, particularly in early sources. In versions that did consider him part of the crew, he often does not remain for the entirety of the trip. Different reasons given for his being left behind include that he was a clumsy rower, that he was too hefty for the ship; otherwise, he was accidentally left whilst collecting water. A small number of Hellenistic accounts consider him to have been the leader of the quest, and to have been present for the entire voyage.

=== Land of the Bebryces ===
From Mysia, they departed to the land of the Bebryces which was ruled by King Amycus, son of Poseidon and Melie, a Bithynian nymph. Being a doughty man, he challenged the strangers who came to his kingdom to boxing and slew those who lost. When he challenged the best man of the crew to a boxing match, Pollux fought against him and defeated him with a blow on the elbow. The Bebryces then rushed him, beat him, and forced the Argonauts to flee.

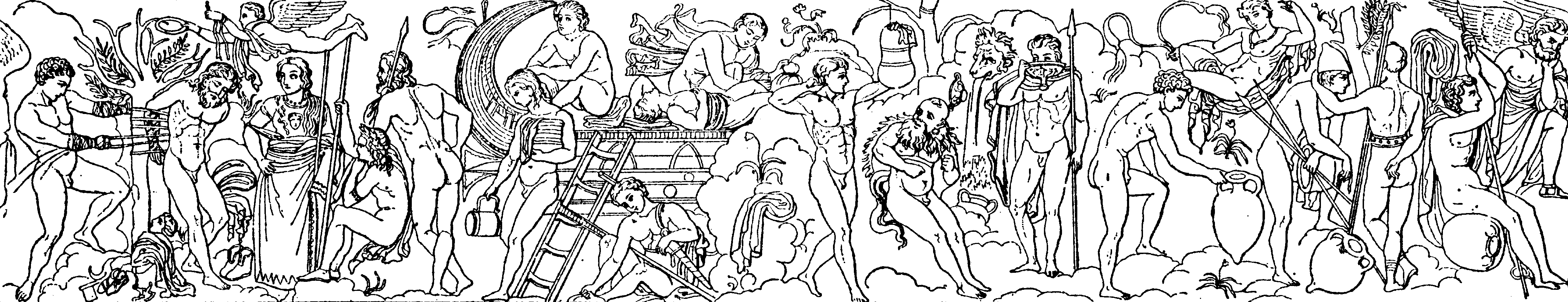
Drawing from an Etruscan cista (340–330 BC) depicting the arrival of the Argonauts in the land of the Bebryces, with Pollux training at a punching bag (center) and leading to the punishment of Amycus (left); the bit of wing at top left shows how the scene would align continuously with the winged figure at right on the surface of the circular vessel

=== Phineus and the Harpies ===
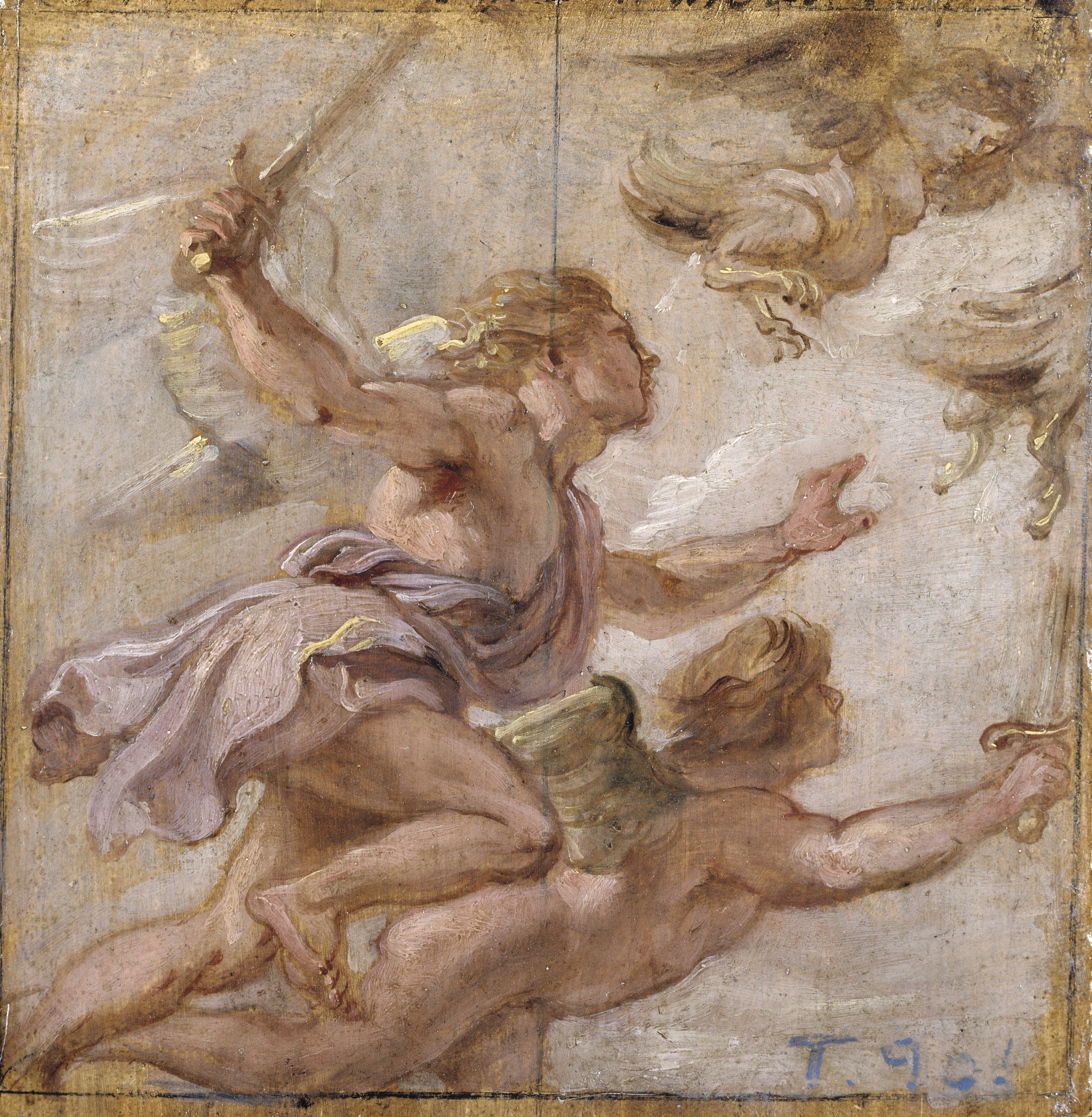
The Persecution of the Harpies (1636/1637) by Rubens

After successfully escaping Bebryces, the Argo landed at Salmydessus in Thrace, where Phineus lived. Phineus was said to be a seer who was bestowed by Apollo with the gift of prophecy. Phineus had been blinded by one of the gods, though exactly who and for what reason varies by author. He was blinded either: by Zeus, because he revealed the deliberations of the gods and foretold the future to men; by Boreas and the Argonauts, because his stepmother tricked him into blinding his own two sons (by Cleopatra); or by Poseidon, because he revealed to the children of Phrixus how they could sail from Colchis to Greece.

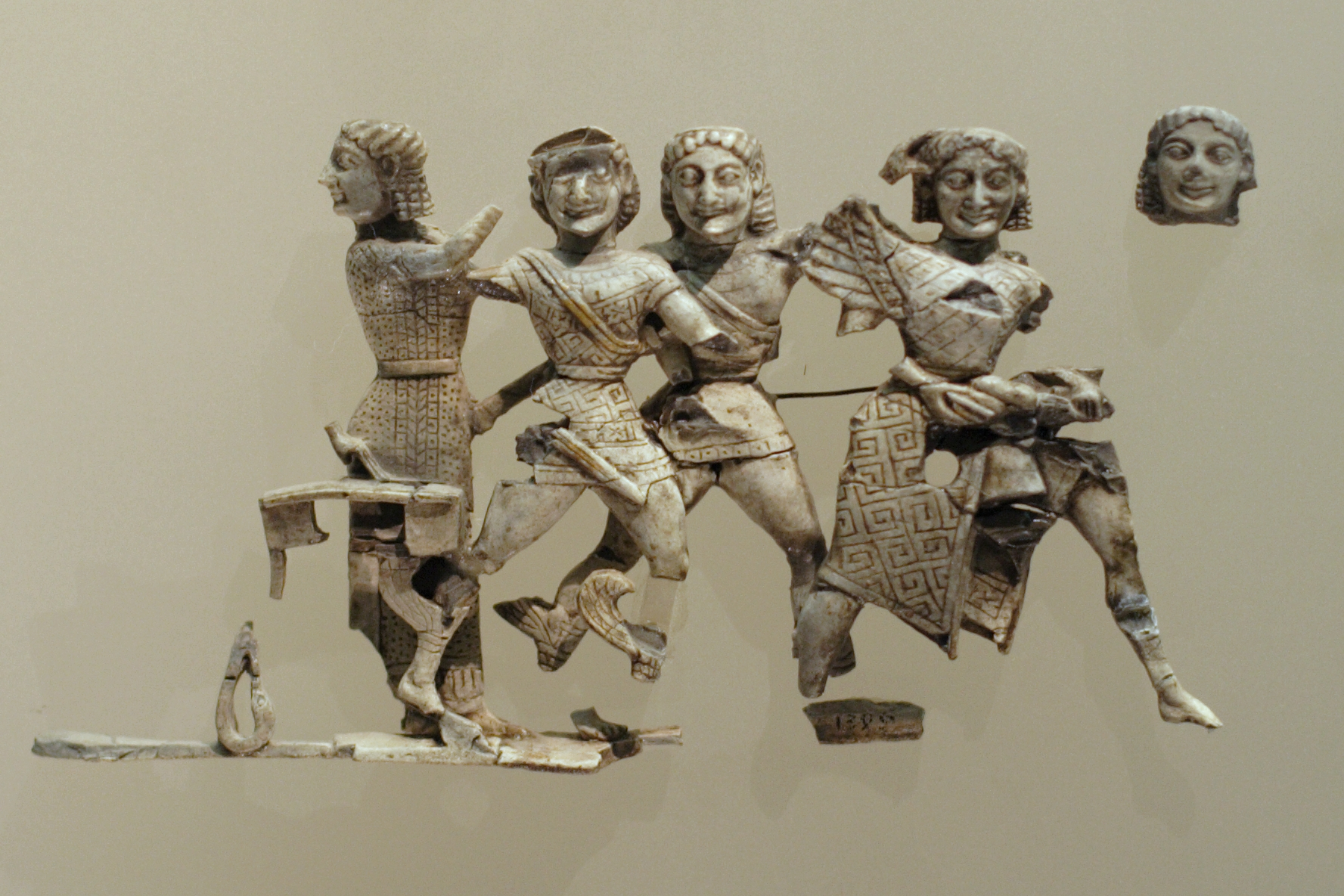
Fragments of an ivory relief (570 BC) depicting the Harpies and a male figure, likely an Argonaut (Archaeological Museum of Delphi)

After the offense, Zeus sent the Harpies to punish him. The Harpies waited until he had set a table and then ensured he could not eat. When the Argonauts consulted him about the voyage, he agreed to join them if they freed him from his punishment. So the Argonauts laid a table for him, and the Harpies with a shriek suddenly pounced down and snatched away the food. When Zetes and Calais, the sons of Boreas, saw this, they drew their swords and, having wings of their own, pursued the Harpies through the air. It was fated that the Harpies should perish by the sons of Boreas, and that the sons of Boreas would die when they could not catch a fugitive. So the Harpies were pursued and one of them fell into the river Tigres in the Peloponnese. The other fled by the Propontis till she came to the Echinadian Islands, where she fell on account of weariness. But Apollonius in the Argonautica says that the Harpies were pursued to the Strophades Islands and suffered no harm, having sworn an oath that they would wrong Phineus no more. Eventually, the Argonauts freed Phineus from the punishment.

=== The clashing rocks ===
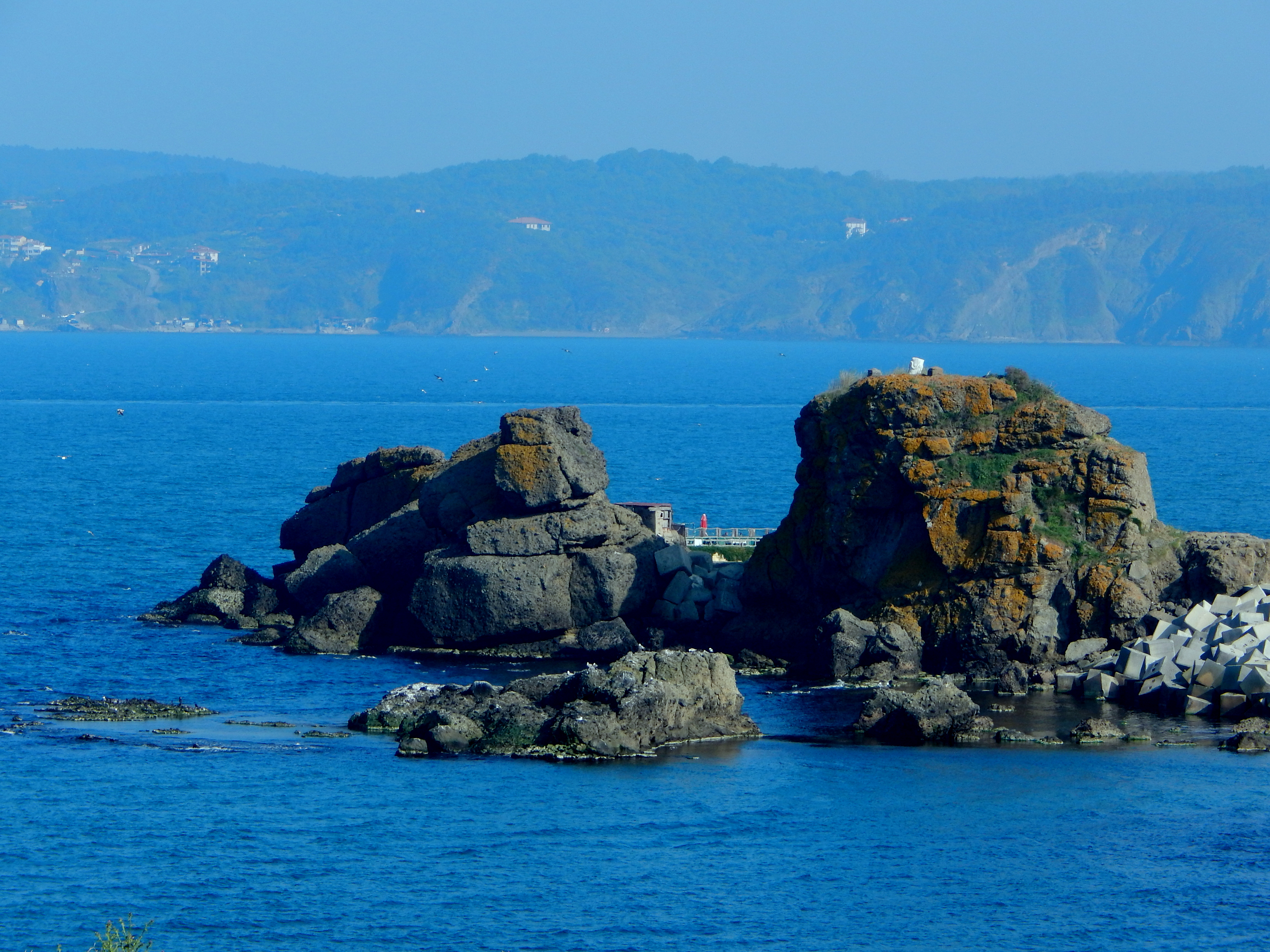
A rock formation off the coast of Istanbul thought to have inspired the Symplegades myth

Being rid of the Harpies, Phineus revealed to the Argonauts the best course and warned them about the Symplegades. The Symplegades (also called the Cyanean Cliffs) were huge rocky cliffs, which could move and close the sea passage thereby crushing those attempting to pass. Thick was the mist that swept over them. Phineus told them to let a dove fly between the rocks, and, if they saw it pass through safely, to continue with their ship; if they saw it be crushed, then they should not sail through. The Argonauts did as advised: the dove survived, but the rocks closed on her tail feathers. Waiting till the rocks had recoiled, with hard rowing and the help of Hera, they passed through, the extremity of the ship's ornamented prop being crushed just like the dove's tail. It was fated that, as soon as a ship had made the passage, the Clashing Rocks should come to rest completely; accordingly, the rocks never moved again.

=== Lycus ===
The Argonauts next arrived among the Mariandynians. There King Lycus received them kindly, grateful because they had killed Amycus, who had often attacked him. While the Argonauts were staying with Lycus and going out to gather straw, the seer Idmon, son of Apollo, was wounded by a wild boar and died. Tiphys also died on the island, and Ancaeus steered the ship from that point on.

=== Island of Dia ===
By the will of Hera they ended up at the island of Dia. There the Stymphalian Birds wounded them, using their feathers as arrows. Following Phineus' advice they seized shields and spears, and dispersed the birds by making noise. The Argonauts also found shipwrecked men on the island, naked and helpless. They were the sons of Phrixus and Chalciope: Argus, Phrontis, Melas, and Cylindrus. They spoke of their misfortunes to Jason; they had suffered shipwreck whilst travelling to their grandfather Athamas. Jason welcomed and aided them.

The Argonauts, having sailed past the Thermodon and the Caucasus, came to the river Phasis, which is in the Colchian land. The sons of Phrixus led Jason to land and told the Argonauts to conceal the ship. They themselves went to their mother Chalciope and explained why they had come. Chalciope told them about Medea (who was her sister), who she brought with her as she and her sons returned to Jason. When Medea saw Jason, she recognized him as the one she had loved deeply in dreams (which had been sent be Hera), and promised him everything. Jason was then brought to the temple.

=== Aeëtes ===
An oracle told Aeëtes, son of Helios, that he would keep his kingdom as long as the fleece which Phrixus had dedicated remained at the shrine of Ares. When the ship was brought into port, Jason repaired to Aeëtes, and setting forth the charge laid on him by Pelias invited him to give him the fleece. The other promised to hand it over if he single-handedly yoked with adamant the brazen-footed bulls. These were two wild bulls of enormous size that he had received as a gift from Hephaestus; they had brazen feet and puffed flames from their mouths and nostrils. These creatures Aeëtes ordered him to yoke and plow, and to sow from a helmet the dragon's teeth; for he had got from Athena half of the dragon's teeth which Cadmus sowed in Thebes. These tribe of armed men should arise and slay each other. While Jason puzzled how he could yoke the bulls, Hera wished to save him because once when she had come to a river and wished to test the minds of men, she assumed an old woman's form, and asked to be carried across. He had carried her across when others who had passed over despised her. And so, since she knew that Jason could not perform the commands without help of Medea, she asked Aphrodite to inspire Medea, daughter of Aeëtes and the Oceanid Idyia, with love.

At Aphrodite's instigation, the witch conceived a passion for the man. Fearing that Jason might be destroyed by the bulls, she, keeping the thing from her father, promised to help him yoke the bulls and deliver the fleece to him. Medea also asked the hero to swear to have her become his wife and take her with him on the voyage to Greece. When Jason swore to do so, she aided him to be freed from all danger, for she gave him a drug with which she bade him anoint his shield, spear, and body when he was about to yoke the bulls; for she said that, anointed with it, for a single day he could be harmed neither by fire nor by iron. She signified to him that when the teeth were sown, armed men would spring up from the ground against him; and when he saw a knot of them he was to throw stones into their midst from a distance. When the men fought each other about that, he was taken to kill them. On hearing that, Jason anointed himself with the drug. He arrived to the grove of the temple and sought the bulls. And, even though they charged him with a flame of fire, he managed to yoke them. Then, when he had sown the teeth, armed men rose from the ground; and where he saw several together, he pelted them unseen with stones, and when they fought each other, he drew near and slew them. However, though the bulls were yoked, Aeëtes did not give Jason the fleece for he wished to burn down the Argo and kill the crew. But before he could do so, Medea brought Jason by night to the shrine. Having lulled the dragon that guarded it to sleep with her drugs, she possessed herself of the fleece. In Jason's company, she came to the Argo, and the Argonauts put to sea by night to set off to their country.

=== Apsyrtus ===
Medea was attended by her brother Apsyrtus when they escaped from Colchis. When he discovered the daring deeds done by Medea, he started off in pursuit of the ship. Medea noticed her brother's ship and murdered him. Then, she cut his body limb from limb and threw the pieces into the deep. Gathering his child's limbs, Aeëtes fell behind in the pursuit; wherefore he turned back, and, having buried the rescued limbs of his child, he called the place Tomi. He sent out many of the Colchians to search for the Argo, threatening that if they did not bring Medea to him, they should suffer the punishment due to her; so they separated and pursued the search in diverse places. When the Argonauts were already sailing past the Eridanus river, Zeus, in his anger at the murder of Apsyrtus, sent a furious storm upon them which drove them out of their course. And, as they were sailing past the Apsyrtides Islands, the ship spoke, saying that the wrath of Zeus would not cease unless they journeyed to Ausonia and were purified by Circe for the murder of Apsyrtus. So when they had sailed past the Ligurian and Celtic nations and had voyaged through the Sardinian Sea, they skirted Tyrrhenia and came to Aeaea, where they supplicated Circe and were purified.

=== Sirens ===
As the Argonauts sailed past the Sirens, Orpheus restrained them by chanting a counter-melody. Butes alone swam off to the Sirens, but Aphrodite carried him away and settled him in Lilybaion. After the Sirens, the ship encountered Charybdis and Scylla and the Wandering Rocks, above which a great flame and smoke were seen rising. Thetis with the Nereids steered the ship safely through them at the summons of Hera.

=== Phaeacians ===
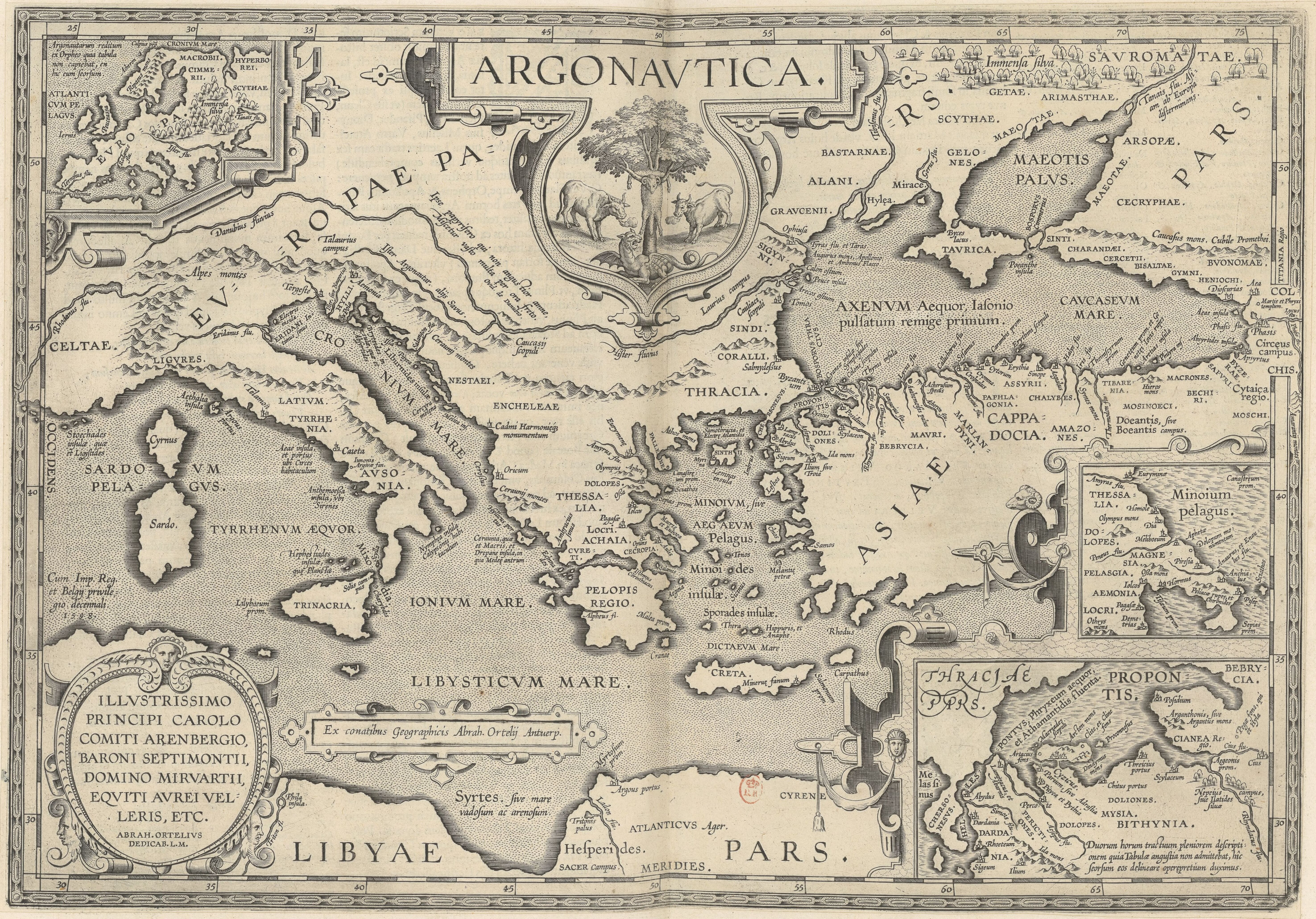
Conjectural map (1598) of the Argonauts' voyage by the Flemish cartographer Ortelius

Having passed by the Island of Thrinacia, where are the kine of the Sun, they came to Corcyra, the island of the Phaeacians, of which Alcinous was king. But when the Colchians could not find the ship, some of them settled at the Ceraunian mountains, and some journeyed to Illyria and colonized the Apsyrtides Islands. But some came to the Phaeacians, and finding the Argo there, they demanded of Alcinous that he should give up Medea. He answered, that if she already knew Jason, he would give her to him, but that if she were still a maid he would send her away to her father. However, Arete, wife of Alcinous, anticipated matters by marrying Medea to Jason.

In some accounts, however, Absyrtus with armed guards was sent in pursuit of the Argo by his father Aeëtes. When the latter had caught up with her in the Adriatic Sea in Histria at King Alcinous' court, and would fight for her, Alcinous intervened to prevent their fighting. They took him as arbiter, and he put them off till the next day. When he seemed depressed and Arete, his wife, asked him the cause of his sadness, he said he had been made arbiter by two different states, to judge between Colchians and Argives. When Arete asked him what judgment he would give, Alcinous replied that if Medea were a virgin, he would give her to her father, but if not, to her husband. When Arete heard this from her husband, she sent word to Jason, and he lay with Medea by night in a cave. Then next day when they came to court, and Medea was found to be a wife she was given to her husband. Nevertheless, when they had left, Absyrtus, fearing his father's commands, pursued them to the island of Athena. When Jason was sacrificing there to Athena, and Absyrtus came upon him, he was killed by Jason. Medea gave him burial, and they departed. The Colchians who had come with Absyrtus, fearing Aeëtes, settled down among the Phaeacians and founded a town which from Absyrtus' name they called Absoros. Now this island is located in Histria, opposite Pola.

Sailing by night, the Argonauts encountered a violent storm, and Apollo, taking his stand on the Melantian ridges, flashed lightning down, shooting a shaft into the sea. Then they perceived an island close at hand, and anchoring there they named it Anaphe, because it had loomed up (anaphanenai) unexpectedly. So they founded an altar of Radiant Apollo, and having offered sacrifice they betook them to feasting; and twelve handmaids, whom Arete had given to Medea, jested merrily with the chiefs; whence it is still customary for the women to jest at the sacrifice.

=== Talos ===
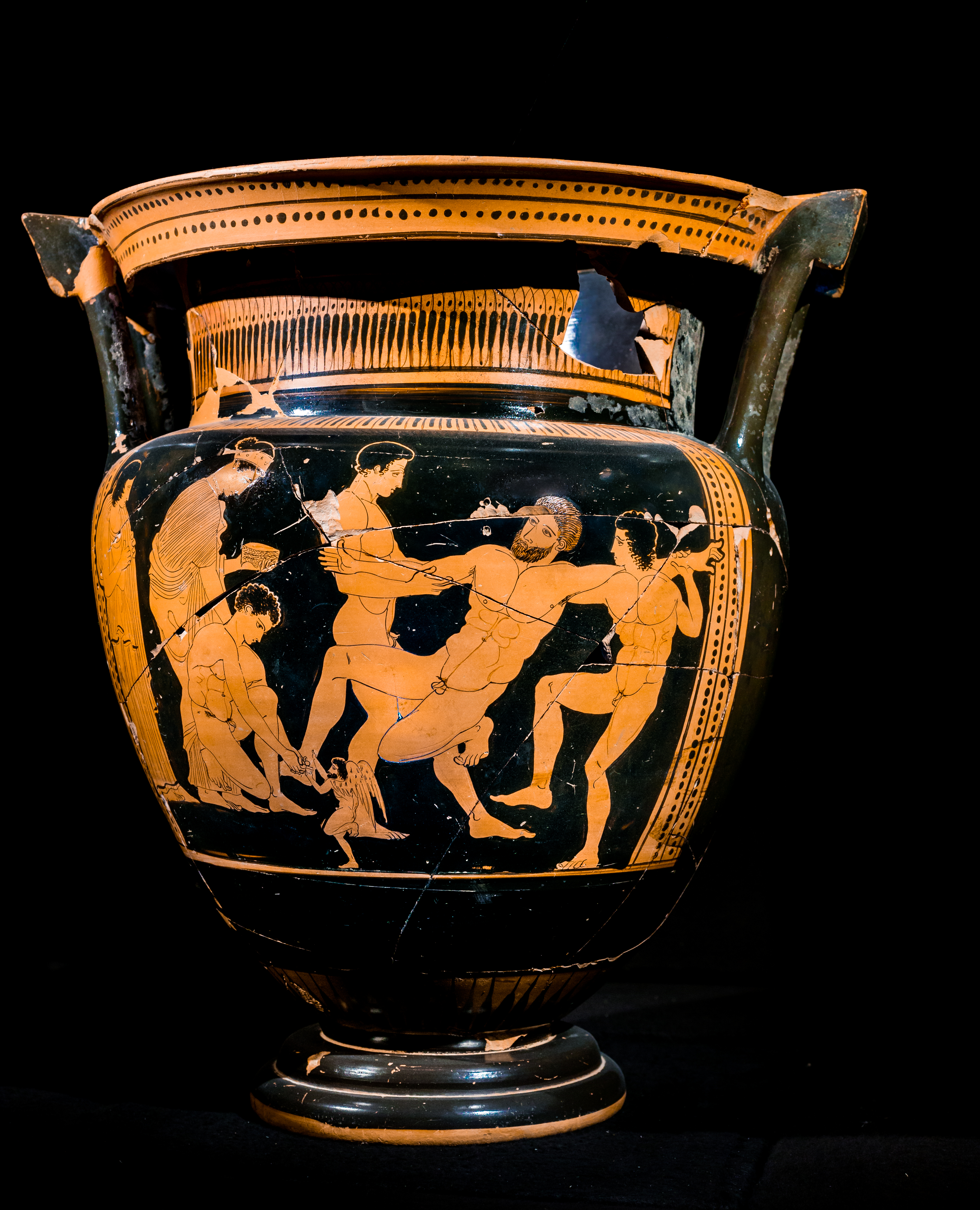
Pulling the plug on Talos as Medea stands by with her magic box (Attic red-figure column-krater, 450-400 BC)

Putting to sea from there, they were hindered from touching at Crete by Talos. Some say that he was a man of the Brazen Race, others that he was given to Minos by Hephaestus; he was a brazen man, but some say that he was a bull. He had a single vein extending from his neck to his ankles, and a bronze nail was rammed home at the end of the vein. This Talos kept guard, running round the island thrice every day; wherefore, when he saw the Argo standing inshore, he pelted it as usual with stones. His death was brought about by the wiles of Medea, whether, as some say, she drove him mad by drugs, or, as others say, she promised to make him immortal and then drew out the nail, so that all the ichor gushed out and he died. But some say that Poeas shot him dead in the ankle.

=== Homecoming ===
After staying on Aegina a single night to recover from their encounter with Talos, there was a skirmish/competition to see who could collect the most fresh water. After they sailed between Euboea and Locris and to arrive in Iolcus, having completed the whole voyage in about four months.

=== Alternative stories for the returned route ===
Sozomen wrote that when the Argonauts left from the Aeëtes, they returned from a different route, crossed the sea of Scythia, sailed through some of the rivers there, and when they were near the shores of Italy, they built a city in order to stay at the winter, which they called Emona (Ancient Greek: Ἤμονα), part of modern-day Ljubljana in Slovenia. At summer, with the assistance of the locals, they dragged the Argo to the Aquilis river (Ancient Greek: Ἄκυλιν ποταμὸν), which falls into the Eridanus. The Eridanus itself falls into the Adriatic Sea.

Zosimus wrote that after they left from the Aeëtes, they arrived at the mouth of the Ister river which it discharges itself into the Black Sea and they went up that river against the stream, by the help of oars and convenient gales of wind. After they managed to do it, they built the city of Emona as a memorial of their arrival there. Afterwards placing the Argo, on machines they drew it as far as the sea-side and from there they went at the Thessalian shore.

Pliny the Elder wrote that some writers claim that the Argo came down some river into the Adriatic Sea, not far from Tergeste but that river is now unknown. While other writers say that the ship was carried across the Alps on men's shoulders, having passed along the Ister river, then along the Savus river, and then to Nauportus which is lying between the Emona and the Alps.

== Legacy ==
The Porto Ferraio on the island of Elba, was known in ancient times as the portus Argous (Ἀργῶος λιμήν), because it was believed that the Argonauts landed there on their return voyage, while sailing in quest of Circe.

The Slovenian municipality of Vrhnika also depicts a ship on its coat of arms, as it is believed to have been the starting point to the final journey by foot of the Argonauts.

== See also ==
- Argo Navis
- Argonaut Mine
- Toronto Argonauts, a Canadian Football League team
- Argonaut Rowing Club, a rowing club based in Toronto
- University of West Florida; the mascot of the University
- In the 1898 short novel The Story of Perseus and the Gorgon's Head, the mythical story of the Argonauts is described.
