= Richard H. Wilkinson =

American egyptologist (born 1951)

Richard H. Wilkinson (born 1951) is an archaeologist in the field of Egyptology. He is Regents Professor Emeritus, Ph.D. at the University of Arizona and founding director of the University of Arizona Egyptian Expedition. He conducted research and excavation in Egypt for 25 years, mainly in the Valley of the Kings, and most recently excavating the royal temple of Twosret, a queen of the Nineteenth Dynasty of Egypt who ruled Egypt as a king.

Wilkinson has held a number of professional offices. He is the founding editor of the Journal of Ancient Egyptian Interconnections, a scholarly journal dedicated to the interactions of ancient Egypt with other ancient Near Eastern and Mediterranean cultures. He is the author of many scholarly articles and books on Egyptology and his books have been translated into many languages. He is best known for his studies of Egyptian symbolism and his work in Egyptian archaeology.

In 2013, the University of Arizona Egyptian Expedition published a major 367 page book in his honour titled: "ARCHAEOLOGICAL RESEARCH IN THE VALLEY OF THE KINGS AND ANCIENT THEBES. Papers Presented in Honor of Richard H. Wilkinson" PDF of Book edited by Pearce Paul Creasman.

== Publications ==
- Reading Egyptian Art: A Hieroglyphic Guide to Ancient Egyptian Painting and Sculpture (1992)
- Symbol and Magic in Egyptian Art (1994)
- Valley of the Sun Kings: New Explorations of the Tombs of the Pharaohs, (editor: Richard H. Wilkinson), The University of Arizona Egyptian Expedition, 1995 PDF
- The Complete Valley of the Kings With C. Nicholas Reeves (1996)
- The Complete Temples of Ancient Egypt (2000)
- The Complete Gods and Goddesses of Ancient Egypt (2003)
- Egyptology Today (2008)
- Egyptian Scarabs (2008)
- Richard H. Wilkinson, (editor), THE TEMPLE OF TAUSRET: Tausret Temple Project, 2004-2011 The University of Arizona Archaeology Expedition, 2011 PDF
- Tausret: Forgotten Queen and Pharaoh of Egypt (2012) Archived Book Review
- The Oxford Handbook of the Valley of the Kings With Kent R. Weeks (2015)
- Pharaoh’s Land and Beyond: Ancient Egypt and its Neighbours With Pearce Paul Creasman (2017)

== Publication in Honor of Richard H. Wilkinson ==
- ARCHAEOLOGICAL RESEARCH IN THE VALLEY OF THE KINGS AND ANCIENT THEBES. Papers Presented in Honor of Richard H. Wilkinson (editor: Pearce Paul Creasman), University of Arizona Egyptian Expedition, Wilkinson Egyptology Series, Volume I 2013
