= Armenus =

Argonaut from Greek mythology

In Greek mythology, Armenus or Armenius (Ancient Greek: Ἄρμενος) was one of the Argonauts, though he was obscure and rarely discussed.

He was believed to have been a native of Rhodes or of Armenion in Thessaly, and to have settled in the country which was called, after him, Armenia.
