= Tausret =

Pharaoh of Egypt from 1191 to 1188 BC

- Twosret, Tawosret
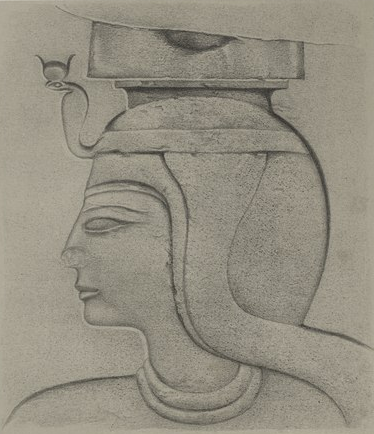
- Drawing of a relief of Tausret, from Lepsius' Monuments from Egypt and Ethiopia

Pharaoh
- Reign: 8-9 regnal years: 1191–1188 BC (Note: Tausret reigned de jure 2-4 years, but she retroactively counted her time as Siptah's regent into her regnal years.)
- Predecessor: Siptah
- Successor: Setnakhte
Royal titulary
Horus name
Kanakht Merymaat
Kꜣ-nḫt-mrj-Mꜣꜥ.t
Strong bull, beloved of Maat
G5	E1 D40 C10 U6 i i
Kanakht Merymaat Nebanemnisutmiitum
Kꜣ-nḫt-mrj-Mꜣꜥ.t-nb-ꜥn-m-nsw-mj-Jtm
Strong bull, beloved of Maat, Lord beautiful of kingship, like Atum
G5	E1 D40 C10 U6 M17 M17 V30 D36 N35 D6 Aa15 M23 X1 N35 A41 W19 A45
Nebty name
Geregkemet Wafkhasut
Grg-Kmt-wꜥf-ḫꜣswt
Founder of Egypt, who vainquishes foreign countries
G16	U17 Y1 I6 Aa13 X1 O49 G43 D40 I9 N25 X1 Z2ss
Prenomen
Sitre Meryamun
Sꜣt-Rꜥ-mrj(t)-Jmn
Daughter of Ra, beloved of Amun
M23 t L2 t < H8 t C2 C12 mr i i >
Hieroglyphic variants:
M23 t L2 t < C2 C12 N36 n G39 t >
M23 t L2 t < C2 C12 N36 H8 t >
M23 t L2 t < N5 G39 X1 Z1 U6 M17 Y5 N35 G7 >
Nomen
Tausret [Setepenmut]
Tꜣ-wsr.t-[stp-n-Mwt]
Mighty Lady, [chosen of Mut]
G39 N5 < X1 G1 F12 S29 D21 D40 B7 >
Tausret-Setepen[mut]
Tꜣ-wsr.t-[stp-n-Mwt]
Mighty Lady, chosen [of Mut]
G39 N5 < t&A wsr B1 t stp n >
- Consort: Seti II
- Children: child from KV56 (?)
- Died: 1188 BC
- Burial: KV14 in the Valley of the Kings
- Monuments: Mortuary temple in Western Thebes
- Dynasty: 19th Dynasty

Tausret, also spelled Tawosret or Twosret (d. 1188 BC) was the last known ruler and the final pharaoh of the Nineteenth Dynasty of Egypt.

She is recorded in Manetho's Epitome as "Thuoris, who in Homer is called Polybus, husband of Alcandra, and in whose time Troy was taken." She was said to have ruled Egypt for seven years, but this figure included the nearly six-year reign of Siptah, her predecessor. Tausret simply assumed Siptah's regnal years as her own.

While her sole independent reign could have lasted for perhaps one to one and a half years, from 1191 to 1189 BC, this number now appears more likely to be closer to three full years instead. Excavation work by the University of Arizona Egyptian Expedition on her memorial temple ("temple of millions of years") at Gournah strongly suggests that it was completed and functional during her reign and that Tausret started a regnal year 9, which means that she had two and more likely three independent years of rule, once one deducts the nearly six-year reign of Siptah. Her royal name, Sitre Meryamun, means "Daughter of Re, beloved of Amun."

== Family ==
=== Parentage ===
Twosret or Tausret's birth date is unknown. She did not hold title of "King's Daughter", meaning she was not daughter of any Pharaoh and her later claim to kingship would come solely through her marriage to Seti II.

=== Marriage and Children ===
She was thought to be the second royal wife of Seti II. There are no children for Tausret and Seti II, unless tomb KV56 represents the burial of their child.

==== Unidentified KV 56 ====
Theodore Davis identified Tausret and her husband's names in a cache of jewelry found in tomb KV56 in the Valley of the Kings. This tomb also contained objects bearing the name of Rameses II. There is no consensus about the nature of this tomb. Some (Aldred) thought this was the tomb of a daughter of Seti II and Tawosret, but others (Maspero) thought this was a cache of objects originally belonging with the tomb of Tawosret herself.

== Reign ==
During the reign of Ramesses III, a list of kings at Medinet Habu shows Merneptah, Seti II followed directly by Setnakhte (founder of the 20th Dynasty), omitting Amenmesse, Tausret and Siptah as illegitimate. Her relationship with Seti II and the chronology of Amenmesse, Tausret and Siptah are based on much speculation and conjecture.

=== Regent ===
After her husband's death, she became first regent to Seti's heir Siptah jointly with Chancellor Bay, a West Asian. Siptah was likely a stepson of Tausret since his mother is now known to be a certain Sutailja or Shoteraja from Louvre Relief E 26901.

=== Pharaoh ===
When Siptah died, Tausret officially assumed the throne for herself as the "Daughter of Re, Lady of Ta-merit, Twosret of Mut", and assumed the role of a Pharaoh.

While it was commonly believed that she ruled Egypt with the aid of Chancellor Bay, a recently published document by Pierre Grandet in a BIFAO 100 (2000) paper shows that Bay was executed on Siptah's orders during Year 5 of this king's reign. The document is a hieratic ostracon or inscribed potshard and contains an announcement to the workmen of Deir al Madinah of the king's actions. No immediate reason was given to show what caused Siptah to turn against "the great enemy Bay," as the ostracon states. The recto of the document reads thus:

Year 5 III Shemu the 27th. On this day, the scribe of the tomb Paser came announcing 'Pharaoh, life, prosperity, and health!, has killed the great enemy Bay'.

This date accords well with Bay's last public appearance in Year 4 of Siptah. The ostracon's information was essentially a royal order for the workmen to stop all further work on Bay's tomb since the latter had now been deemed a traitor to the state. Aidan Dodson believes that Tausret engineered Bay's downfall so that she would have total control at the palace court and need no longer share power with her political rival. As Dodson writes:

Although [this act was nominally] carried out in the name of the still young Siptah, one can probably safely assume that the initiative was taken by Tawosret, signaling her intention to share power no longer with her erstwhile colleague in regency [Bay]. While Bay’s name remained intact on many of his monuments, it was probably at this point that his extraordinary representations in the bark-shrine at Karnak were erased.

Meanwhile, Egyptian territories in Canaan seem to have become effectively independent under the overlordship of a man called Irsu. Papyrus Harris I, the main source on these events, claims that Irsu and Tausret had allied themselves, leaving Irsu free to plunder and neglect the land.

=== Year 8 ===
==== Mortuary Temple Foundations ====
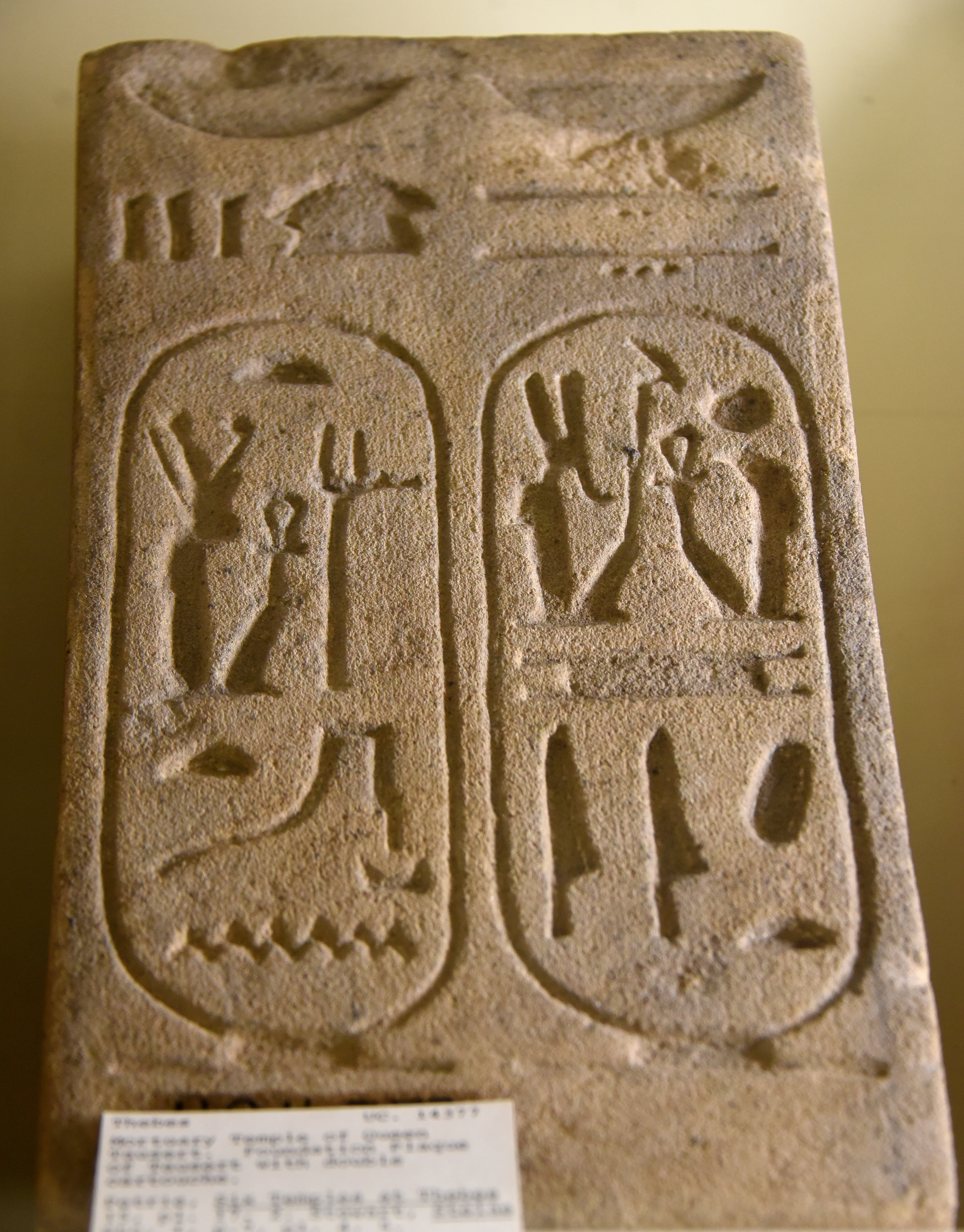
Foundation plaque bearing the double cartouches of Queen Tausret. From the mortuary temple of Tausret at Thebes, Egypt. 19th Dynasty. Petrie Museum, London

Tausret's highest known date is a Year 8 II Shemu day 29 hieratic inscription found on one of the foundation blocks (FB 2) of her mortuary temple at Gournah in 2011 by the University of Arizona Egyptian Expedition. Since this was only a foundation inscription and Tausret's temple, although never finished as planned, was at least built and completed, it is logical to assume that some time must have passed before her downfall and the termination of work on her temple project. Richard H. Wilkinson stressed that Tausret's mortuary temple was "structurally completed" with a roof over the temple and walls bearing plastered walls with minimal decoration before work was halted. Wilkinson notes:

A key indicator of the advanced completion of the building of a stone structure is found in the areas of what modern Egyptians call dekka – mudgypsum flooring – found in patches on many of the floor surfaces we have uncovered (and still visible if largely destroyed on others), indicating that walls had already been built around these areas, as the dekka floor surfaces would have been destroyed in the building process if they had been put in before the walls were built. In addition to the presence of mud-gypsum flooring of surface areas, plaster found on and around many of the stone chunks we have uncovered would also seem to indicate that walls and other features were built and plastered before being later demolished for their stone. The presence of plastered walls would indicate roofing was in place on the temple, as no one would plaster a wall before the roof was built. Most of the plaster is undecorated, however, suggesting that while the temple had been largely structurally completed, decoration had perhaps only been begun in a few areas before the work was halted.

Therefore, Tausret must have ruled for one or a maximum of two more years beyond II Shemu 29 of her 8th Year for her temple to reach completion. As Richard Wilkinson wrote in 2011:

[The discovery of the Year 8, 2nd month of shemu day 29 hieratic inscription] ... has particular significance, for it confirms the text we discovered in 2006 on an adjacent foundation block (FB1) which was dated also to the eighth year of the queen’s reign. Although Tausert’s reign (including her regency for Siptah) has been understood commonly as being seven years (as stated by Manetho in his Aegyptiaca History), or eight at the most, the inscriptions on the foundation blocks show otherwise. Because they were made when the temple was begun, and we now have archaeological evidence that the temple was completed or nearly so (it must have taken a couple of years), these texts indicate clearly that Tausert must have reigned nine, or perhaps, even ten years.

=== Reign length ===
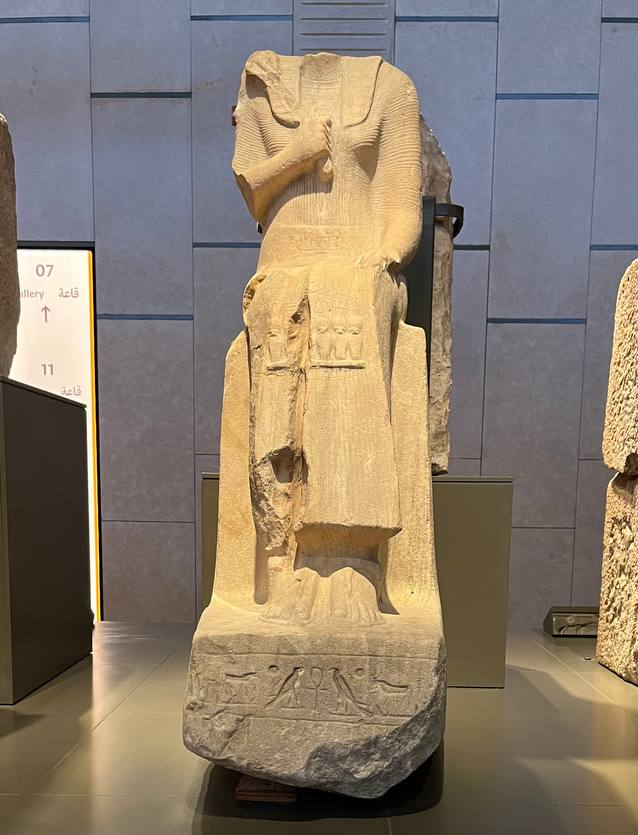
Headless statue of Tausret, now in the Grand Egyptian Museum, Cairo

==== Manetho ====
In the tradition of Manetho, Africanus preserves Thuris (7 years), Eusebius has Thuris (7 years), and Jerome has Thuoris (7 years).

==== Year 9? ====
Further study by Pearce Paul Creasman has concluded that:

"Tausret's temple was very close indeed to completion in terms of construction, and a suggestion can be offered that the sanctuary was functional before its destruction. Given the relative brevity of Tausret's reign, it would not be surprising if the sanctuary, as the “center of movement” of the temple, had received a full complement of preparations even while the remainder of the temple lacked it. The temple seems to have been at least functionally operational prior to its destruction." Tausret should, hence, have ruled for 1 or perhaps 2 more years after the Year 8 foundation temple inscription date to achieve these levels of completion, thus starting her 9th regnal year around the interval of IV Akhet/I Peret—when her husband died (since she assumed Siptah's reign as her own) or perhaps longer—before Setnakhte's rule began. Or she could have had a nearly full 9th-regnal year reign, including the 6-year reign of Siptah.

Pearce Creasman writes in 2013, "if the foundations of [Tausret's temple] were laid in her eighth year and construction of the temple was completed, or nearly so, Tausret must have ruled long enough past her eighth regnal year to see this accomplished. At least an additional year, maybe two, would likely have been needed"

Evidence that Tausret reigned closer to 9, rather than 8, full years since her mortuary temple was mostly completed under her reign is also provided by a sandstone fragment found in the blockyard at Medinet Habu (MH bl. 0936) which:

shows two stages of carving on adjoining faces, the later of which, bearing the names of Ramesses III, is part of a frieze from the destroyed inner chambers of his mortuary temple. The earlier inscription is found to contain the name and royal titles of Tausret, with cartouches erased but not reinscribed, and it is shown that this block must originally have come from her [ie. Tausret's] destroyed mortuary temple. This piece thus demonstrates for the first time that Tausret's temple was dismantled for building material and its blocks reused in the Medinet Habu complex early in Ramesses III's reign.

The fragment—and Richard Wilkinson's analysis that the stone mortuary temple was 'structurally completed' with a roof over the temple and walls bearing plastered walls with minimal decoration in "The Temple of Tausret: The University of Arizona Egyptian Expedition Tausret Temple Project, 2004–2011" proves that Tausret's temple was actually built after the Year 8 temple foundations were set in the ground—and minimally decorated which means that she would have ruled Egypt for 9 and possibly 10 years—including the first 5 and a half years of Siptah. A reign of 9 years seems likely—meaning 3 separate full years for Tausret. When the Year 8 II Shemu day 29 hieratic inscription foundation block was placed into the ground of Tausret's mortuary temple, she had ruled Egypt for 7 years and almost 6 months—including the reign of Siptah on the Egyptian dating system—since she counted her reign from the death of Siptah's predecessor and her husband—Seti II—who is believed to have died around I Peret day 2. Tausret could not have built her temple in the short 6 month time interval from II Shemu day 29 to I Peret day 2 when her Regnal Year changed from Year 8 to Year 9 around I Shemu day 2 given her substantially completed mortuary temple at Gournah with its erected temple walls, temple roof and partly decorated walls—with a nearly functioning temple sanctuary. Since Paul Creasman maintains that it would have taken 1 to 2 years before work on Tausret's temple nearly complete mortuary temple was stopped, she certainly started a Regnal Year 9 (and a less likely Regnal Year 10) and had a reign of around 9 full years.

=== End of Tausret's reign ===
Tausret's reign ended in a civil war, documented in the Elephantine stela of her successor Setnakhte, who became the founder of the Twentieth dynasty. While it is not known if she was overthrown by Setnakhte or whether she died peacefully in her own reign and a conflict broke out at court over her succession; the former scenario is the most likely. Her immediate 20th dynasty successor Setnakhte and his son Ramesses III described the late 19th dynasty as a time of chaos. Setnakhte usurped the joint KV14 tomb of Seti II and Tausret but reburied Seti II in tomb KV15, while deliberately replastering and redrawing all images of Tausret in tomb KV14 with those of himself. Setnakhte's decisions here may demonstrate his dislike and presumably hatred for Tausret since he chose to reinter Seti II but not Tausret.

Setnakhte himself does not seem to have harboured any animosity towards Siptah. Tausret likely erased Siptah's own royal cartouches in his KV47 royal tomb and replaced the cartouches of Siptah with those of Seti II in KV14, Tausret's own tomb, once she had presumably begun her own reign as pharaoh. As Dodson writes:

"Taken together, it seems that although Tawosret appears to have granted Siptah a burial, it was one that denied his status as a king, and was combined with Tawosret's desire to refocus her royal affiliations on her husband, rather than the young man for whom she had ruled for half a decade."

Setnakhte, however, reinstated Siptah's cartouches in the young king's tomb which suggests that this person's opponent was not Siptah but rather Siptah's successor, Tausret. It appears most likely that Setnakhte overthrew Tausret from power in a civil war. Setnakhte's son and successor, Ramesses III, later decided to exclude both Tausret and even Siptah of the 19th dynasty from his Medinet Habu list of Egyptian kings thereby delegitimizing them in the eyes of the Egyptian citizenry.

== Death ==
=== Tomb ===
At Thebes, the Tomb of Tausret (KV14) was located in the Valley of the Kings. Tausret's KV14 tomb has a complicated history; it was started in the reign of Seti II. Tomb scenes show Tausret accompanying Siptah, but Siptah's name had later been replaced by that of Seti II presumably by Tausret who wished to associate herself with her late husband. The tomb was then usurped by Setnakhte, and extended to become one of the deepest royal tombs in the valley while Tausret's sarcophagus was reused by prince Amenherkhepeshef in KV13. Hartwig Altenmuller believes that Seti II was buried in one of the rooms in KV14 and later reburied in KV15. Others question this scenario.

=== Mummy ===
The Mummy of Tausret has not been found. A mummy found in KV35 and known as Unknown Woman D has been identified by some scholars as possibly belonging to Tausret, but there is no other evidence for this other than the correct Nineteenth Dynasty period of mummification.

=== Destruction of Tausret's mortuary temple and reuse of her tomb ===
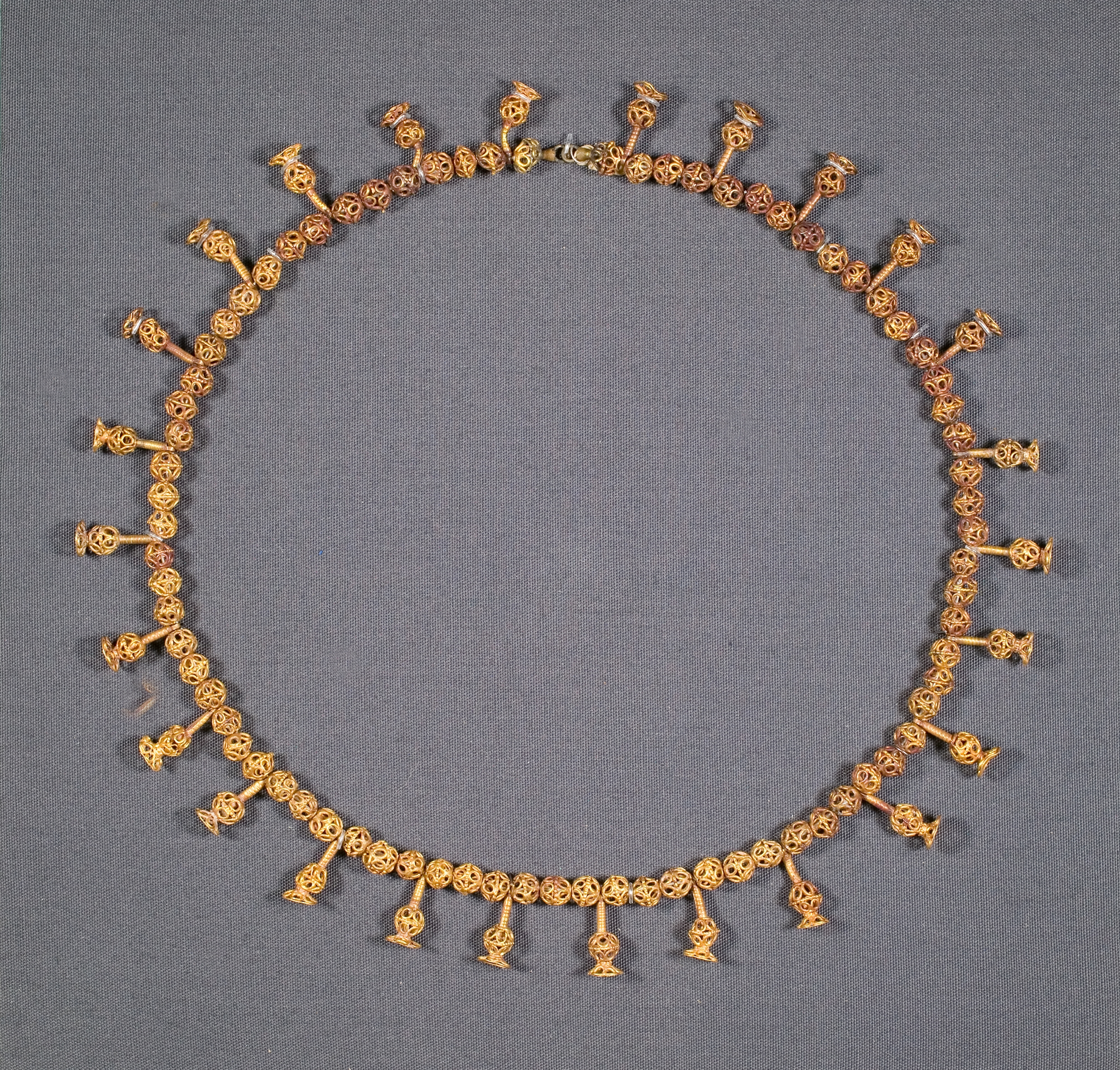
A gold necklace of cornflower beads found with the jewellery of Queen Tausret

Pearce Creasman writes in 2013 that Tausret's 20th dynasty successors felt the overwhelming need to usurp her KV14 tomb and comprehensively destroy her mortuary temple. Tausret was one of the last ruling descendants of Ramesses II (the Great) of the 19th dynasty, and thus the founders of the 20th dynasty of Egypt presumably feared the shadow cast by this female pharaoh. Therefore,

the founder of the 20th Dynasty, Sethnakht, or his long-ruling son, Ramesses III, set out against Tausret's memory and its physical manifestations. This dramatic refutation of the legitimacy of their unrelated 19th Dynasty predecessor likely made it easier for their own lineage to take root and overpower what must have been a substantial number of other potential claimants to the throne. Ramesses II, from whom Tausret is generally believed to be descended, had fathered as many as 100 children. Tausret’s royal cousins, and potential heirs, must have been legion....The attacks on Tausret’s monuments proved effective, so much so that when the site of Tausret's Theban temple was very briefly surveyed and selectively dug in 1896 by a team under the supervision of W. M. Flinders Petrie, "only a few stones of the foundation remained."

== Attestations ==
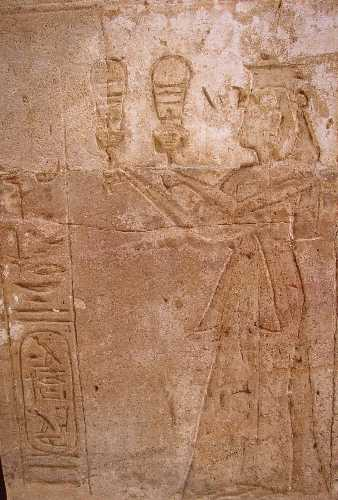
Relief of Tausret holding two sistrums at Amada Temple, Nubia

It is believed that expeditions were conducted during her reign to the turquoise mines in Sinai and in Palestine and statues have been found of her at Heliopolis and Thebes. Her name is also found at Abydos, Hermopolis, Memphis, and in Nubia.

Inscriptions with Tausret's name appear in several locations:

- The Bilgai Stela belonged to Tausret. It records the erection of a monument in the area of Sebennytos.
- A pair statue of Tawosret and Siptah is now in the Staatliche Sammlung für Ägyptische Kunst Munich (no 122). Siptah is shown seated on Tausret's lap.
- In the temple at Amada, Tausret is depicted as a Great Royal Wife and God's Wife.
- A statue from Heliopolis depicts Tausret and her names are inscribed with a mixture of male and female epithets. Tausret herself is depicted as a woman.
- A cartouche of hers believed to come from Qantir in the Delta has been found
- Tausret and Siptah's names have been found associated with the turquoise mines at Serabit el Khadim and Timna (in the Sinai and Palestine).
- A faience vase bearing a cartouche of Tausret was found at Tell Deir Alla in Jordan. A vase bearing the cartouche of Tausret was found at Tell Deir Alla in Jordan and a silicified sandstone statue found at Heliopolis represents Tausret whose names are inscribed with a mixture of masculine and feminine epithets. Tausret herself is represented as a woman, with the inscription she who is "beloved of Hathor, Lady of the Red Mountain."
- Tausret constructed a Mortuary temple next to the Ramesseum, but it was never finished and was only partially excavated (by Flinders Petrie in 1897), although recent re-excavation by Richard H. Wilkinson and Pearce Paul Creasman shows it is more complex than first thought. The temple was excavated by the Tausert Temple Project (2004 to present).

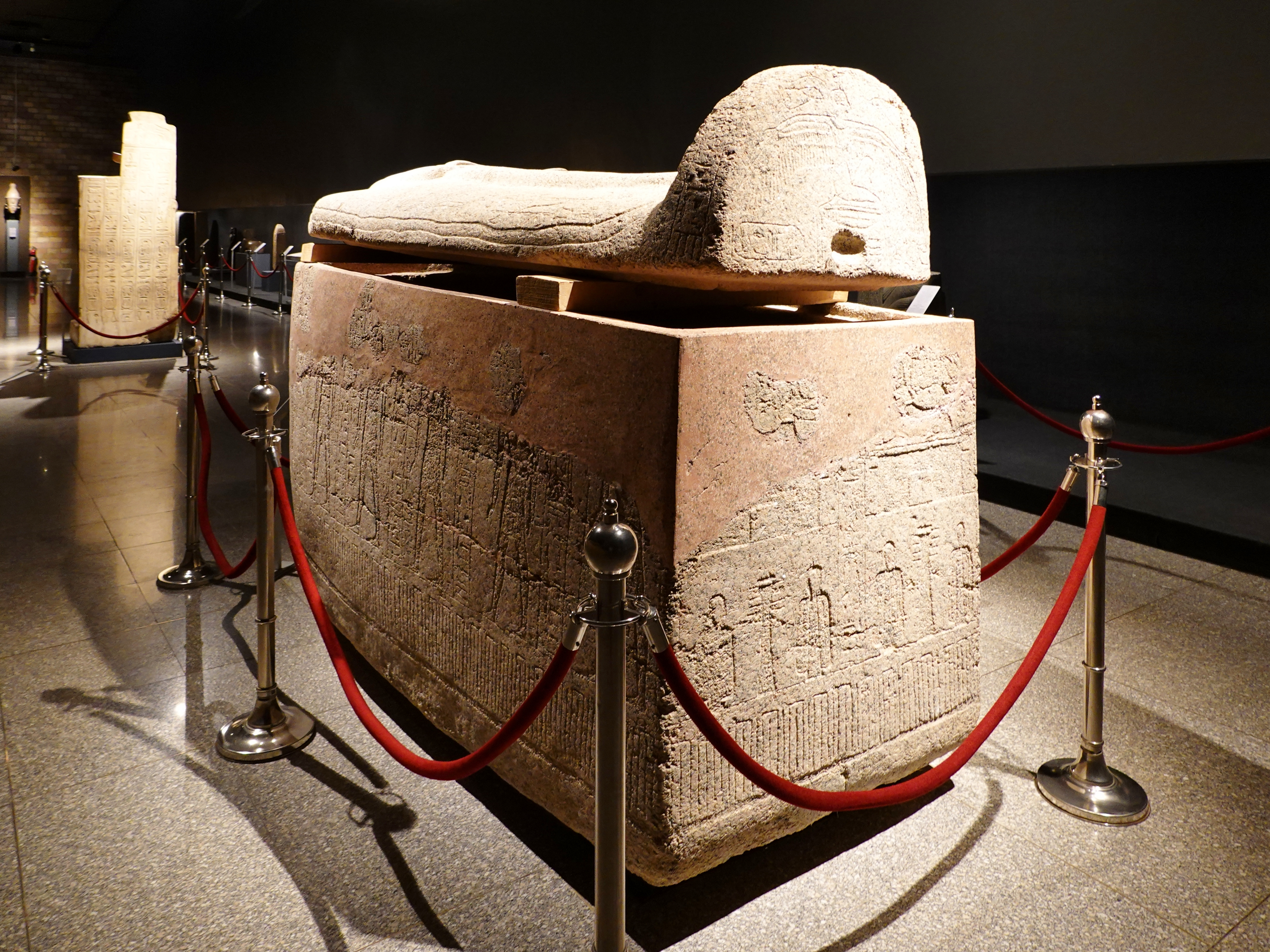
Tausret's coffin, later usurped by prince Amunherkhepeshef

== Bibliography ==
- Gae Callender, "The Cripple, the Queen & the Man from the North", KMT, Vol: 17 No. 1, Spring 2006, pp. 49–63
- Kevin Lee Johnson, Transition and Legitimation in Egypt's Nineteenth and Twentieth Dynasties: A Study of the Reigns, of Siptah, Tausret, and Setnakht PDF, The University of Memphis, August 2012
- Leonard H. Lesko, "A Little More Evidence for the End of the Nineteenth Dynasty", Journal of the American Research Center in Egypt, Vol. 5, (1966), pp. 29–32 (accessible through JSTOR)
- Richard H. Wilkinson, (eds), THE TEMPLE OF TAUSRET: Tausret Temple Project, 2004-2011 The University of Arizona Archaeology Expedition, 2011. (Dated texts found in the Temple are placed on pages 121-130)
- Richard H. Wilkinson (ed.), Tausret: Forgotten Queen & Pharaoh of Egypt, Oxford University Press, 2012.
