= Argia (mythology) =

Figures in Greek mythology

Argia /ɑːrˈdʒaɪə/, Argea /ɑːrˈdʒiːə/, or Argeia (Ancient Greek: Ἀργεία, romanized: Argeía) may refer to several figures in Greek mythology:

- Argia, one of the 3,000 Oceanids, water-nymph daughters of the Titans Oceanus and his sister-spouse Tethys. She was the mother of Phoroneus, by her brother Inachus, a river-god of Argos. Argeia may also have been the mother (by Inachus) of Io.
- Argia, wife of Polybus and mother of Argus. The later was the builder of the ship Argo from the story of Jason and the Argonauts. Others credited Danaus or Arestor to be this Argus' father.
- Argia, an Argive princess as the daughter of King Adrastus and Amphithea, daughter of Pronax. She married Polynices, son of Oedipus and bore him three sons: Thersander, Adrastus and Timeas.
- Argia, a Theban princess as the daughter of King Autesion. She married Aristodemus and became the mother of twins, Eurysthenes and Procles, the ancestors of the two royal houses of Sparta.
- Argeia, was also an epithet of the Greek goddess Hera derived from Argos, the principal seat of her worship.
