= Gerakari, Larissa =

Gerakari Γερακάρι
- Community
- Location within Greece
- Coordinates: 39°41.4′N 22°41.5′E
- Country: Greece
- Administrative region: Thessaly
- Regional unit: Larissa
- Municipality: Agia
- Municipal unit: Agia

Area
  - Community: 11.31 km^{2} (4.37 sq mi)
- Elevation: 90 m (300 ft)

Population (2021)
  - Community: 234
  - Density: 20.7/km^{2} (53.6/sq mi)
- Time zone: UTC+2 (EET)
  - Summer (DST): UTC+3 (EEST)
- Postal code: 400 03
- Area code: +30-2494
- Vehicle registration: PI

Gerakari (Greek: Γερακάρι, Greek pronunciation: [ʝεɾα'kaɾi]) is a village and a community of the Agia municipality. The community of Gerakari covers an area of 11.31 km^{2}.

== Population ==
Historical population
Year	Pop.	±%
2001	335	—
2011	266	−20.6%
2021	234	−12.0%

== History ==
The village is the site of the ancient city of Amyrus.

== See also ==
- List of settlements in the Larissa regional unit
