= Phanus (mythology) =

In Greek mythology, Phanus (Ancient Greek: Φᾶνος means "light, bright, torch") was one of the Argonauts who sailed to Colchis in the quest of retrieving the Golden Fleece. He was the son of Dionysus and brother of Staphylus, another of the Argo crew. Their mother was likely Ariadne of Crete. Phanus' other brothers were Thoas, king of Lemnos and Oenopion, king of Chios.
