= Tom Harper (actor) =

British actor (born 1977)

- Born: 1977 (age 48–49)
- Occupation: Actor
- Years active: Since 2000

Thomas L. Harper (born 1977) is a British actor.

== Early life and education ==
Harper attended the Webber Douglas Academy of Dramatic Art in London, where he was classically trained in acting.

== Career ==
Harper has appeared in over a dozen films and more than ten television productions. His first screen role was as Acastus in Jason and the Argonauts (2000), a two-part, fantasy-adventure television film. Harper has since appeared in other television productions including episodes of the television series Agatha Christie's Poirot, Foyle's War, Silent Witness, Midsomer Murders, and Spooks: Code 9.

His film work includes appearing in The Upside of Anger (2005) and Telstar: The Joe Meek Story (2008).
