= Pearce Paul Creasman =

American archaeologist

Pearce Paul Creasman (born 1981) is an American archaeologist in the fields of Egyptology, maritime archaeology, and dendrochronology. In recognition of his work he has been made a fellow of the Explorer's Club, the Royal Geographical Society, and the Linnean Society, among others. From 2009 to 2020, he was a professor and curator at the University of Arizona, where he served as director of the Egyptian Expedition. Beginning in 2020, he was appointed executive director of the American Center of Oriental Research. He has been conducting archaeological and environmental research in Egypt and Sudan since 2004 and is editor of the peer-reviewed Journal of Ancient Egyptian Interconnections. Prof. Creasman is author or co-author of more than 100 articles and edited books and has been awarded more than 60 competitive research grants, including from the National Geographic Society, the National Science Foundation, and the Save America's Treasures program. He has held a number of professional offices and received several academic and educational honors and awards, including recognition from the White House's Office of Science and Technology Policy and National Geographic. He earned his doctorate from the Nautical Archaeology Program at Texas A&M University. Prof. Creasman and his colleagues previously excavated the royal Theban temple of the pharaoh Tausret, a queen who ruled independently as king at the end of the 19th Dynasty, and is now primarily excavating at the pyramids and royal cemetery of Nuri, Sudan. His primary research interests are maritime life in ancient Egypt, Sudanese/Egyptian archaeology, underwater archaeology, and human/environment interactions. He is best known for his work regarding ancient maritime life and studies of human/environmental interactions.

== Publications ==
Books

- Culture in Crisis: Flows of People, Artifacts & Ideas 2 vols. (editor, with F. Balaawi and C.L. Sulosky Weaver), Department of Antiquities, Hashemite Kingdom of Jordan (2022).
- Origins and Afterlives of Kush (editor, with S.T. Smith), The Egyptian Expedition (2022).
- Udjahorresnet and His World: Diplomacy in the Ancient Near East (editor, with M. Wasmuth), The Egyptian Expedition (2020).
- Pharaoh's Land and Beyond: Ancient Egypt and Its Neighbors (editor, with R.H. Wilkinson), Oxford University Press (2017).
- Flora Trade Between Egypt and Africa in Antiquity (editor with I. Incordino), Oxbow Books (2017).
- Archaeological Research in the Valley of the Kings and Ancient Thebes (editor), Wilkinson Egyptology Series I. (2013).
