= Amyrus (mythology) =

In Greek mythology, Amyrus or Amyros (/ˈæ.mɜ.ːɹəs/; Ancient Greek: Ἄμυρος) was one of the Argonauts or a son of Poseidon. He later gave his name to the Thessalian city of Amyrus and to the river Amyrus.

== Sources ==
- Stephanus of Byzantium, Stephani Byzantii Ethnicorum quae supersunt, edited by August Meineike (1790-1870), published 1849. A few entries from this important ancient handbook of place names have been translated by Brady Kiesling. Online version at the Topos Text Project.
