= Armenium =

Coordinates: 39°30′07″N 22°45′15″E

Armenium or Armenion (Ancient Greek: Ἀρμένιον) was a town of Pelasgiotis in ancient Thessaly, situated between Pherae and Larissa, near Boebeis Lake, said to have been the birthplace of Armenus, who accompanied Jason to Asia, and gave his name to the country of Armenia. It is hardly necessary to remark, that this tale, like so many others, arose from the accidental similarity of the names. There is conjecture that this town may be the same as that of Ormenium, but others equivocate or disagree.

The site of Armenium is located near the modern site of Petra.
