= Polybus of Thebes =

Legendary king of Thebes

Polybus (Ancient Greek: Πόλυβος) was the king of Thebes (in Egypt) and husband of Alcandre. Menelaus and Helen stayed in his court for a while after the Trojan War. According to the Egyptian historian Manetho, Polybus was identical to king Thuoris, who can be identified with the ruling queen Tausret.
