= Argus (Argonaut) =

Character from Greek mythology

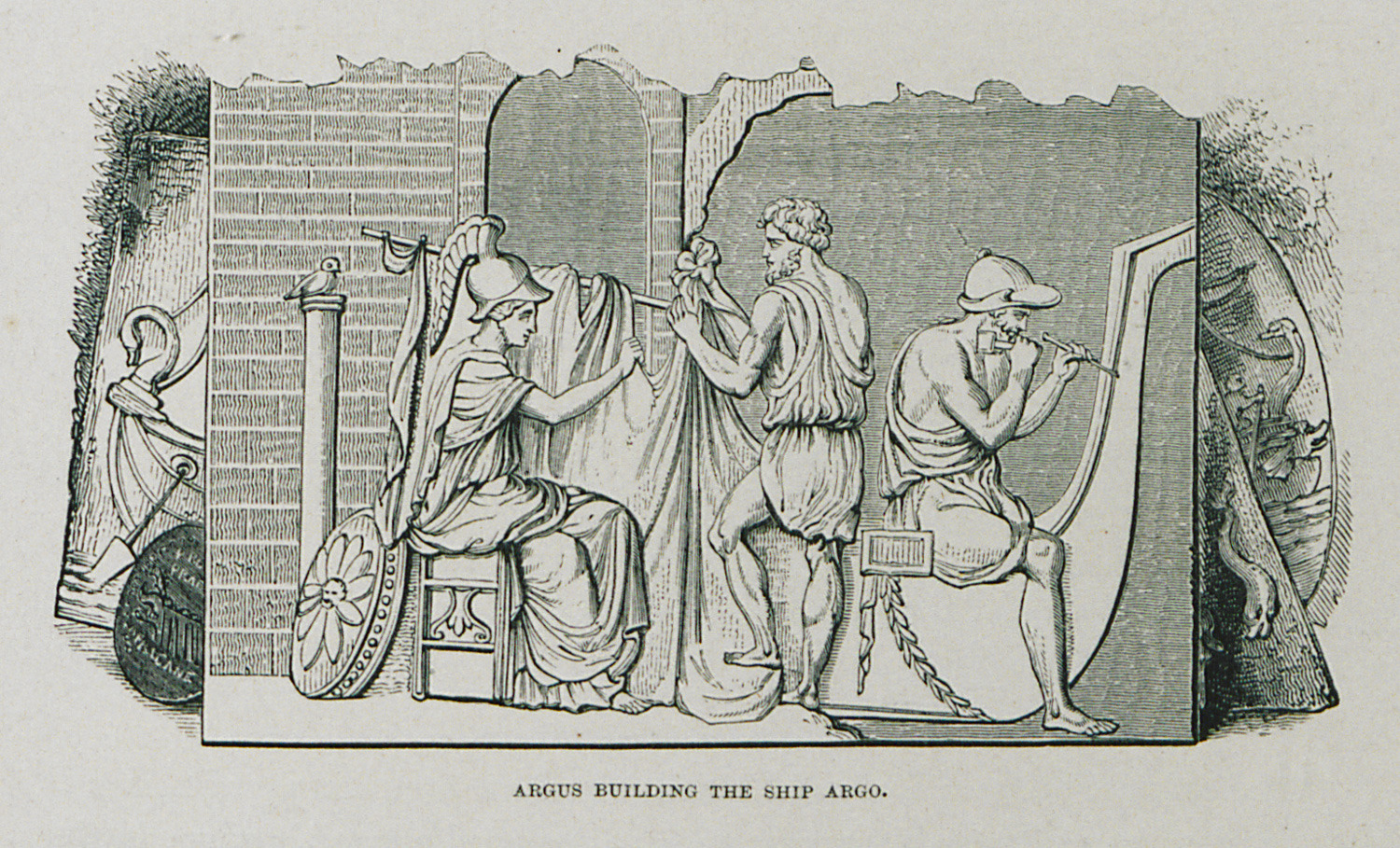
Argus building the Argo, with the help of Athena

In Greek mythology, Argus (/ˈɑːrɡəs/ AR-gəs; Ancient Greek: Ἄργος, romanized: Árgos) was the builder and eponym of the ship Argo, and consequently one of the Argonauts; he was said to have constructed the ship under Athena's guidance. Argus was commissioned to build the Argo by King Pelias (ruler of Iolcus) so that the crew that would come to be known as the Argonauts could find and bring the Golden Fleece back to Iolcus, which was in Thessaly.

== Family ==
Argus' parentage is debated, but most often he is referred to be the son of Arestor. The latter was a member of the Argive royal house, is given as his father by Apollonius Rhodius and John Tzetzes, but Hyginus says Argus' parents were Polybus and Argia or Danaus to be his father.

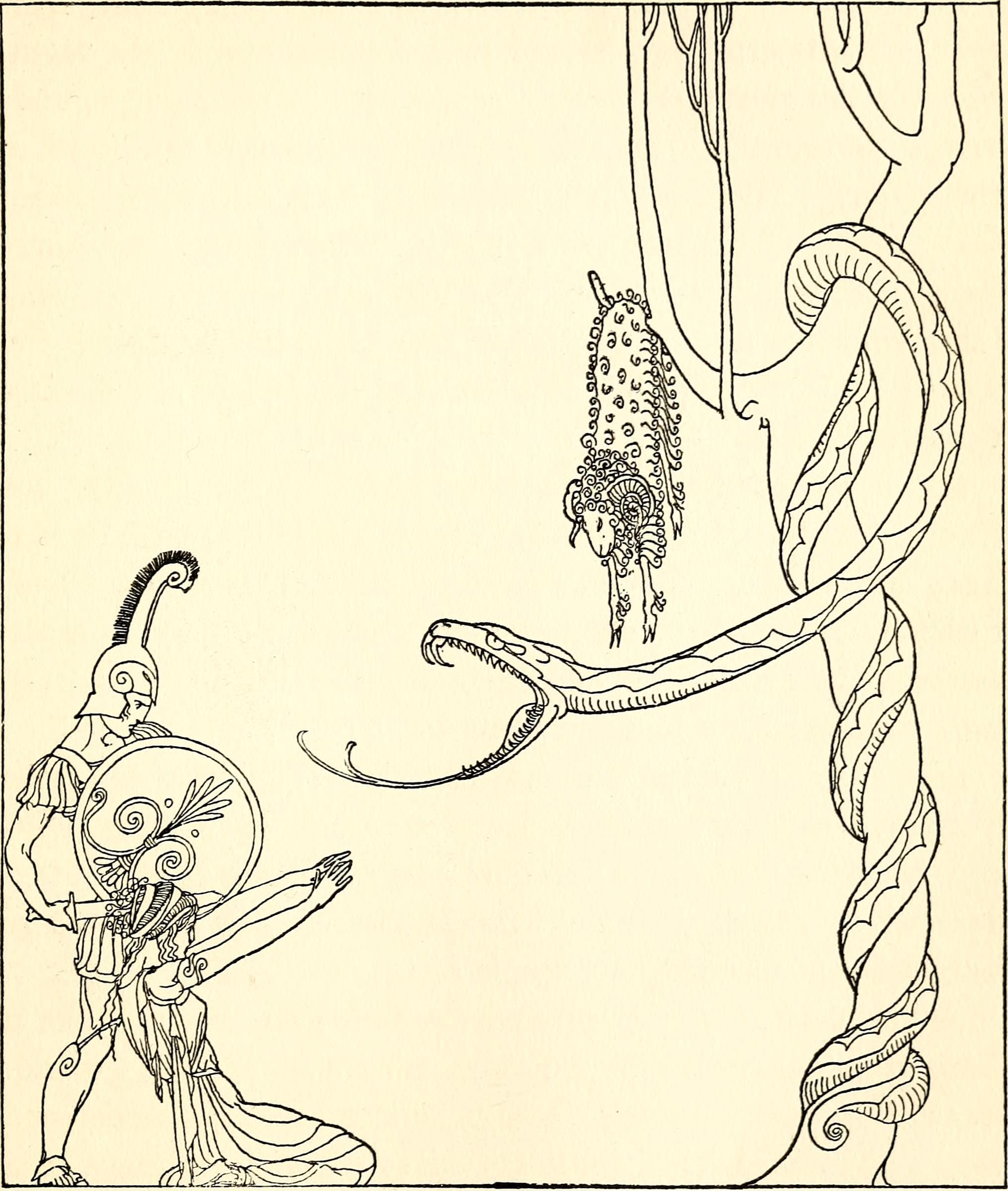
The Golden Fleece

== Mythology ==
In Valerius Flaccus' Argonautica, Argus is said to have originated from Thespiae. Argus was also credited with creating a wooden statue of Hera that was a cult image in Tiryns.

King Pelias did not believe that the crew would be able to come back with the Golden Fleece successfully because he knew that the king of Colchis would not part with it easily, and that a never-sleeping dragon guarded it. So the King gave Jason, leader of the Argonauts, all the timber and the crew he needed. Argus was then selected to build the ship, and he was said to have constructed the ship under Athena's guidance. Athena with the help of Argus put a piece of a sacred oak on the prow of the ship that was taken from the sacred grove of Zeus at Dodona. This sacred piece of wood has the ability to speak in times of danger and advise Jason, the leader of the Argonauts, on what to do. Argus did such a great job constructing this ship that at the time it was referred to the “most seaworthy ship ever seen. The Argo was also notably the first ship that Argus ever built.

Argus, as one of the Argo’s crew, included Greek heroes; Jason, the leader, Augeas, Theseus, Meleager, Peleus, Telamon, Nauplius, Laertes, Orpheus, and Heracles. Many of the crew were fathers of Trojan War heroes.

He should not be confused with the hundred-eyed giant Argus Panoptes.

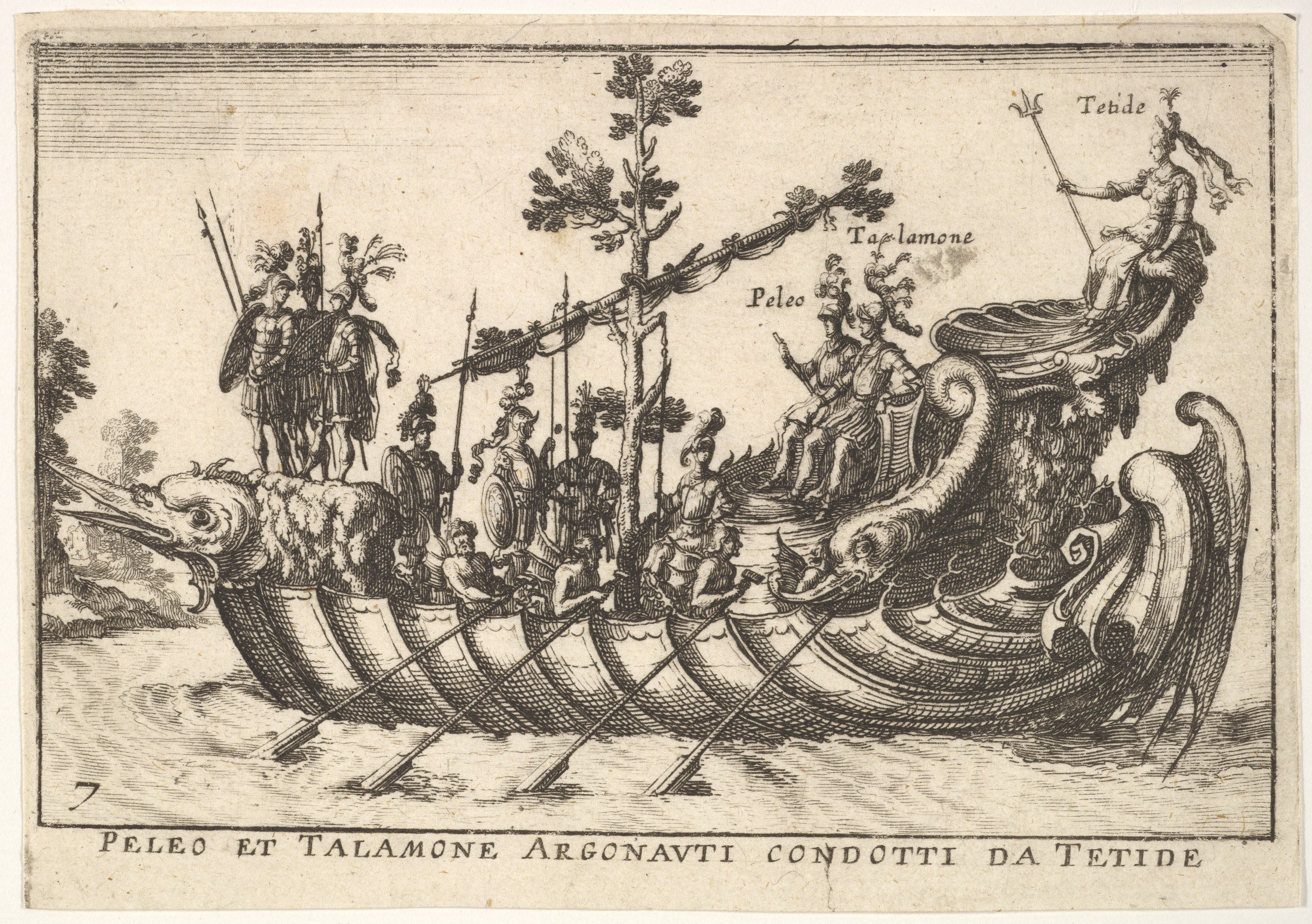
The Argonauts

== In popular culture ==
As an essential element in the retelling of the story of Jason's quest for the Golden Fleece, Argus has appeared in several featured films including the 1958 Italian films Hercules and Hercules Unchained, in which he is portrayed by Italian actor Aldo Fiorelli. Other films have featured Argus as an elderly character including the 1963 film classic Jason and the Argonauts (portrayed by British actor Laurence Naismith) and the 2000 television mini-series of the same name (portrayed by British actor David Calder).
