= Amyrus =

Coordinates: 39°39′37″N 22°41′36″E

Map showing the principal cities of ancient Thessaly. Amyrus is shown to the east of centre, just inside the borders of Magnesia.

Amyrus or Amyros (Ancient Greek: Ἄμυρος) was a town and polis (city-state) in Ancient Thessaly, in the western part of Magnesia, situated on a river of the same name falling into the lake Boebēis. It is mentioned by Hesiod as the "vine-bearing Amyrus." The surrounding country is called the Amyric plain (τὸ Ἀμυρικὸν πέδιον) by Polybius. Modern scholars identify the location of Amyrus at a place called Palaiokastro (old fort) at the modern village of Gerakari. In Greek Mythology, Amyrus is either said to be one of the Argonauts or a son of sea god Poseidon and later gave his name to the city.
