= Arestor =

Ancient Greek mythological figure

In Greek mythology, Arestor (Ancient Greek: Ἀρέστωρ, gen.: Ἀρέστορος) may refer to two distinct characters:

- Arestor, an Argive prince as the son of Phorbas (possibly by Euboea) or Iasus or Ecbasus. According to Pausanias, he was the husband of Mycene, the daughter of Inachus, from whom the city of Mycenae derived its name. Possibly by this woman, Arestor was the father of Argus Panoptes who was called therefore Arestorides. Pelasgus, father of Lycaon of Arcadia, was also called the son of Arestor.
- Arestor, father of another Argus, the builder of Argo.
