= Argo =

Ship of the Argonauts in Greek myth

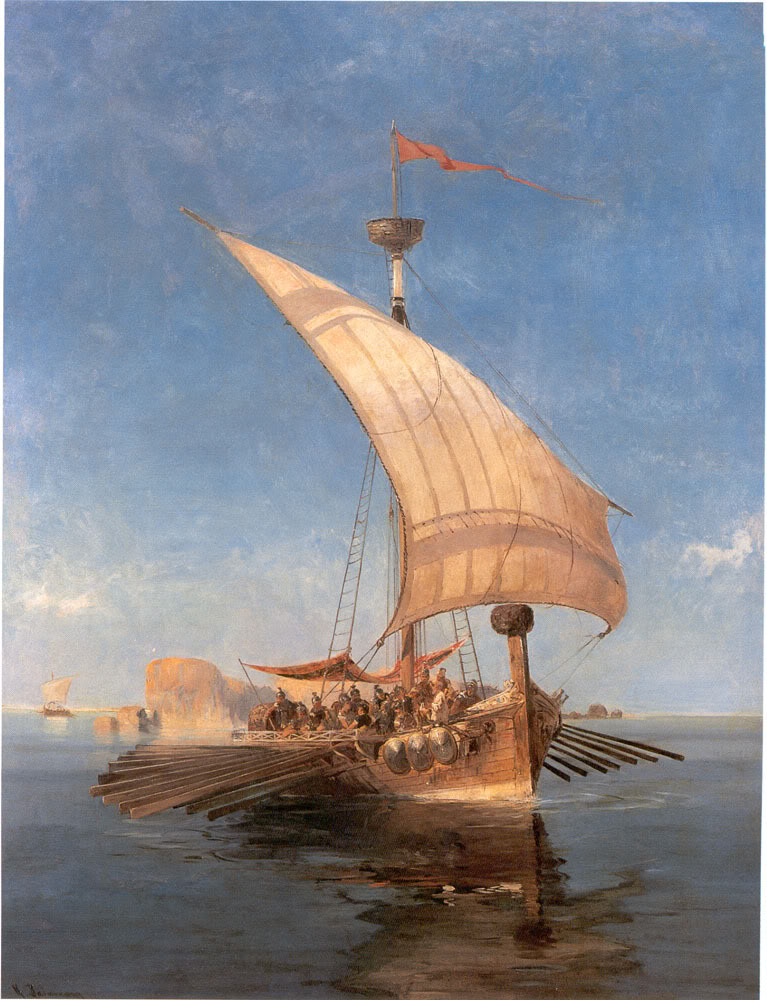
Argo by Konstantinos Volanakis (1837–1907)

In Greek mythology, the Argo (/ˈɑːrɡoʊ/ AR-goh; Ancient Greek: Ἀργώ, romanized: Argṓ) was the ship of Jason and the Argonauts. The ship was built with divine aid and carried the Argonauts on their quest for the Golden Fleece from Iolcos to Colchis. After the journey, the ship was retired and dedicated to Poseidon, the divine ruler of the seas.

The ship has gone on to be used as a motif in a variety of sources beyond the original myth from books, films and more.

== Name ==
Most accounts name the ship after her builder, Argus. The adjectival form is Argoan /ɑːrˈɡoʊən/, from Greek Ἀργῶος through Latin Argōus.

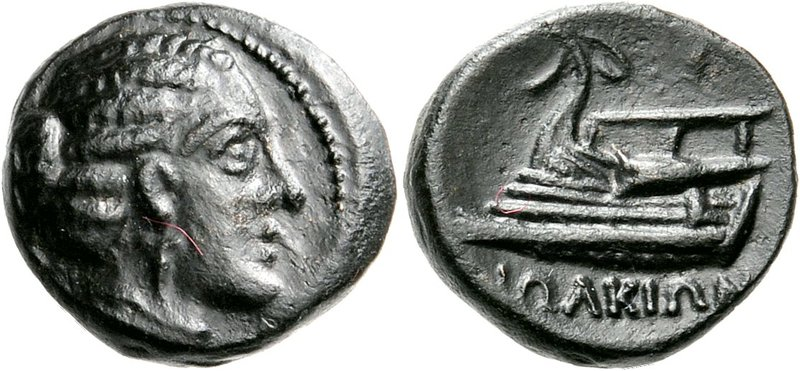
Prow of the Argo on the reverse of a coin of Iolcos (4th century BC), with Artemis Iolkia on the obverse

Diodorus Siculus records that some thought the name was derived from an ancient Greek word for "swift" to indicate that the ship was designed to move quickly. Other ancient Greek theories maintain that the name Argo derived either from its builder, Argos, the son of Hestor or Alector, or from the city of Argos, where it was supposedly constructed. Cicero, the Roman senator and orator, proposed that it was named after the Argives, a name for the Greek people of Argos in the Peloponnese that was commonly used by Homer.

== Construction ==
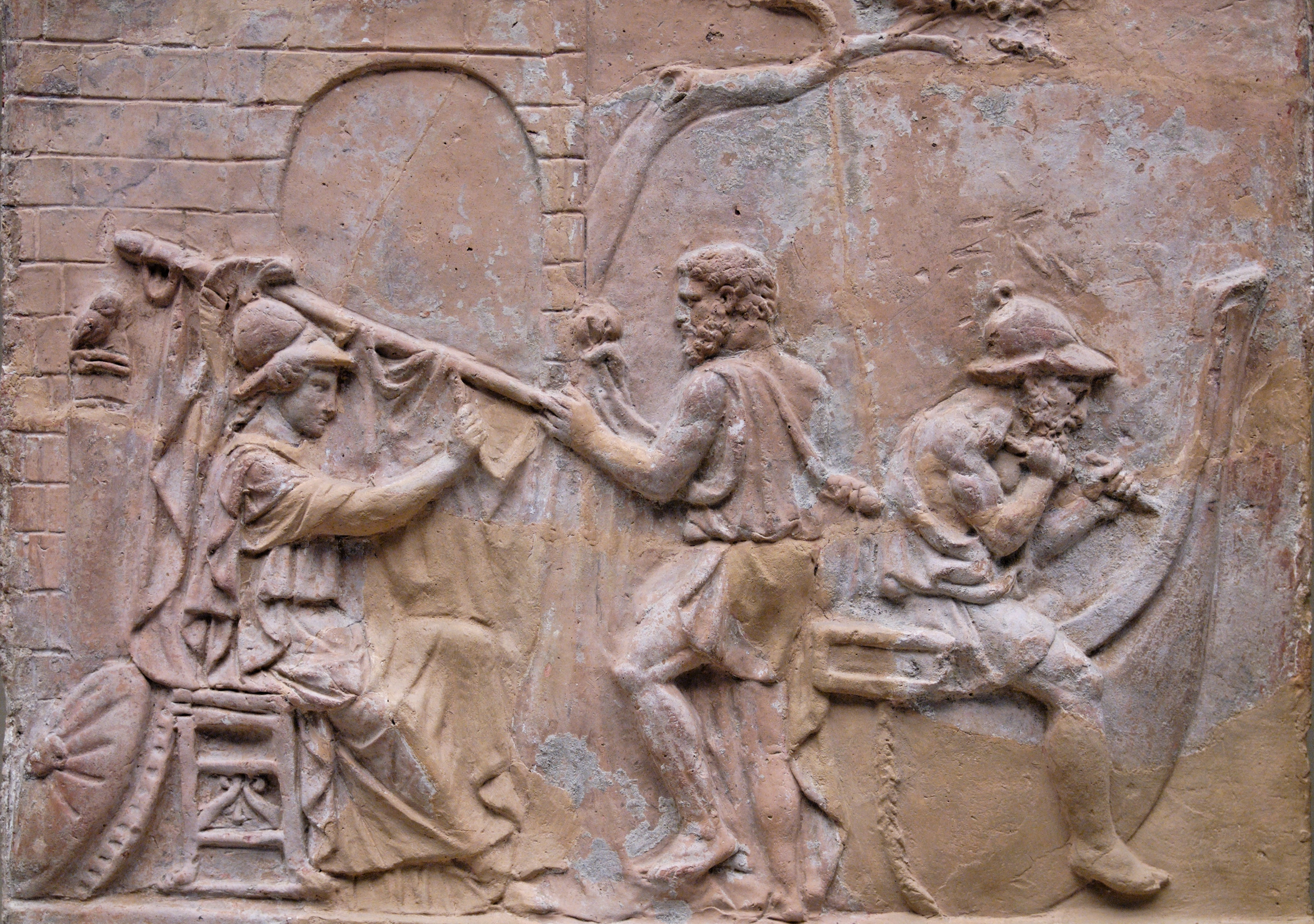
Roman terracotta relief of Athena (left) with Argus (right) and Tiphys building the Argo (British Museum)

The Argo was constructed by the shipwright Argus, and its crew were specially protected by the goddess Hera. The best source for the myth is the Argonautica by Apollonius Rhodius. Argus was said to have planned or constructed the vessel with the help of Athena. The ship was built for travel in the open sea and designed to move quickly with the assistance of a sail. Apollodorus stated the ship had fifty oars, all of which were manned by the Argonauts. His description of the boat would place it as a forerunner or early version of a boat type that became known as a penteconter.

The boat was built with a variety of wood from around the region of Greece. In Medea, Euripides mentions the oars were made from pine trees around Mount Pelion. Catullus later mentioned the boat was made out of fir-wood. The prow of the ship was also made with a special piece of oak from Dodona, an area sacred to Zeus. The oak was said to be able to speak with a human voice and could tell oracles.

Catullus wrote that the Argo was the first ship to travel on the sea. Dionysius Scytobrachion called the Argo a well crafted vessel but did not consider her the first ship. Some sources state that since people had not seen a ship before they described the Argo as a monster.

The Argo was built in Thessaly around the area of Mount Pelion. The Roman poet Sextus Propertius, writing during the reign of Augustus, said it departed from the port of Pagasae.

== Voyage ==
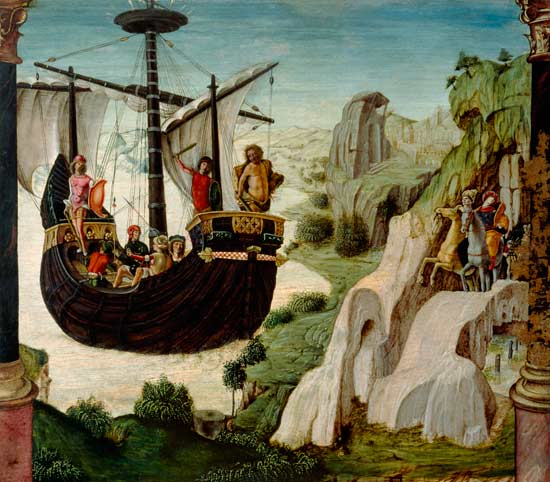
The Argo (c. 1500–1530), painting by Lorenzo Costa

It was Athena who taught Tiphys to attach the sails to the mast, since he was the steersman and would need to know the workings of the ship. Other sources say he had previously been a sailor along with two other members, which is why he was chosen to steer the boat. Lynceus was also said to have helped guide the ship because he had great sight during night and day.

The ship carried enough supplies, such as vases holding water, for the collective crew and lasted four days before having to refuel. Other items, such as a bronze tripod, were carried aboard. Herodotus claimed the bronze tripod was given to Triton after the Argonauts got lost in Lake Tritonis and needed assistance. It was said the boat had to be carried over land for 12 days to get back on course.

The Argo was said to be loved by the Nereids, who alongside Triton helped guide the ship at dangerous times in the Argonauts' journey.

== After the journey ==
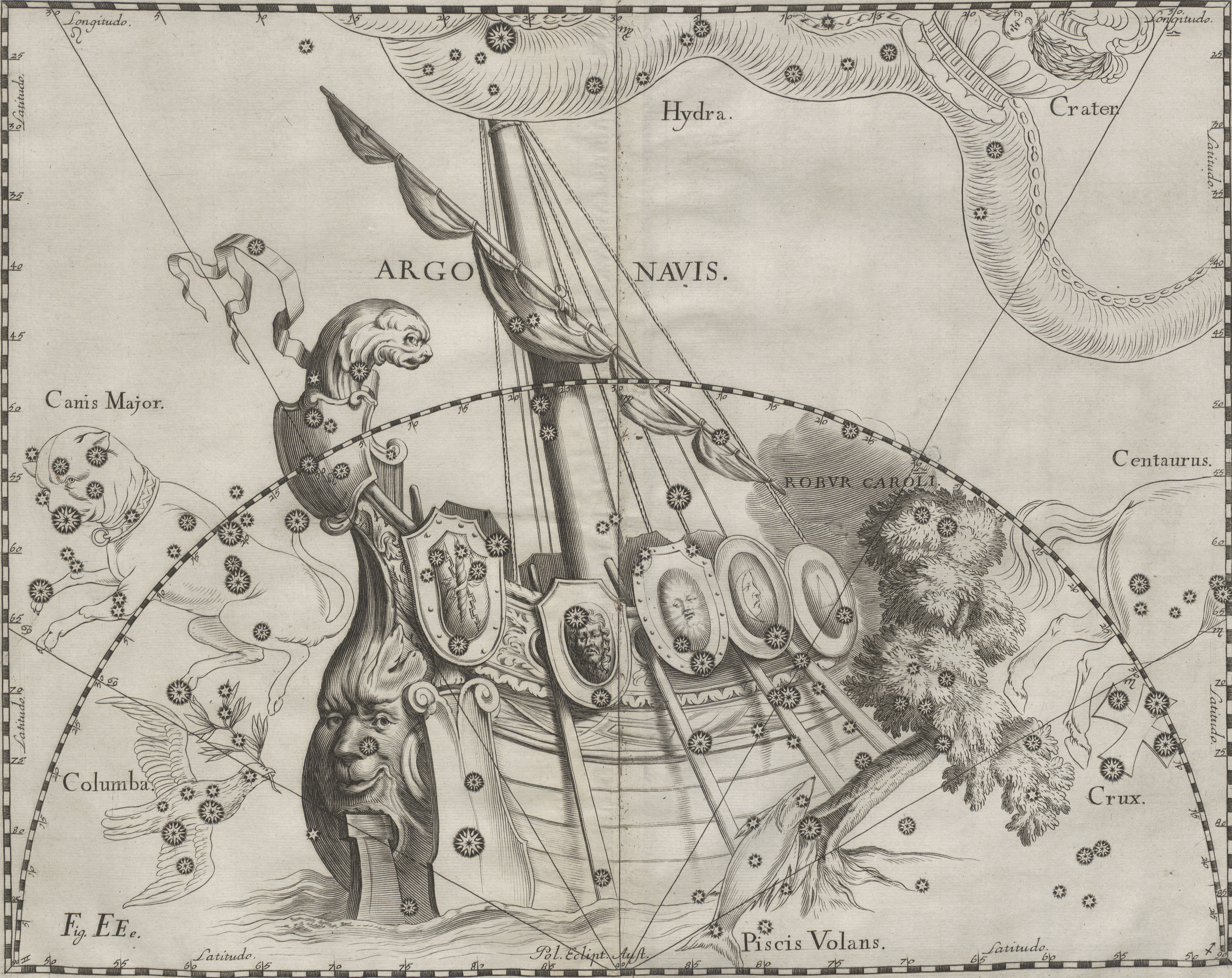
The constellation Argo Navis drawn by Johannes Hevelius

After her successful journey, Argo was consecrated to Poseidon in the Isthmus of Corinth. Because the ship was a sacred item, having been made with the help of the gods, she was made into a monument as well as being dedicated to the gods. Years later, a beam fell from the top of the ship and killed Jason while he was asleep on the ground. He was then translated into the sky and turned into the constellation Argo Navis.

== In other sources ==
The Argo was a well recognized motif in ancient Greece and has been used in plays, movies, books, philosophical writings and more. Several authors of antiquity (Apollonius Rhodius, Pliny, Philostephanus) discussed the hypothetical shape of the ship. Generally she was imagined like a Greek warship, a galley, and authors hypothesized that she was the first ship of this type that had gone out on a voyage on the high seas. Aristotle used the ship as an example to talk about ostracism in Athens, specifically remarking that the ship left Heracles behind because he was too heavy.

=== 1963 film ===
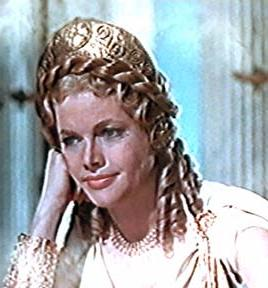
Honor Blackman as Hera in the 1963 movie. Her face was used as a model for the head on the stern of the ship.

The version of the Argo that appears in the 1963 film Jason and the Argonauts was modeled after a Greek warship, with shields lining the side of the boat. On either side of the boat are rowers, who are directed how to row through the drumbeat of a leader. A red sail with the head of the golden ram marks the goal of their journey. Besides its practical purposes, the ship is also decorated with ancient motifs, such as eyes on the front of the ship at the water level. The sacred oak of the ship is here represented as the head of a woman with partial extending wings making up the stern of the ship. The painted head is modeled on the goddess Hera in the movie (played by Honor Blackman) and has the ability to speak to Jason throughout the movie. Argus, the ship builder, said he was inspired to add that feature to the boat when creating it. Filmmakers gave this head the practical effect of being able to open and close its eyes when speaking to Jason.

== See also ==
- Flying Dutchman
- Mendam Berahi
- Prydwen
- Takarabune
