= Taurus (mythology) =

In Greek mythology, Taurus (Ancient Greek: Ταῦρος, romanized: Taûros, lit. 'bull') may refer to the following characters:

- Taurus, a prince of Pylos and son of King Neleus by Chloris, daughter of King Amphion of Orchomenus. He was the brother to Pero, Asterius, Pylaon, Deimachus, Eurybius, Epilaus, Evagoras, Phrasius, Eurymenes, Alastor, Nestor and Periclymenus. Along with his father and other brothers, except Nestor, he was killed by Heracles during the sack of Pylos.
- Taurus, general of Minos. When Theseus left Crete there was a naval battle in the Cretan harbour as Theseus was sailing out, in which Minos's general Taurus lost his life. It has also been said that General Taurus was conquered by Theseus in wrestling during certain funeral games held by King Minos; and the Cretans, including the king, were particularly pleased to see their own general defeated in the games, since he was a hateful personage accused besides of having intimacy with Queen Pasiphae.
- Taurus, father of Side who gave her name to the Pamphylian city Side.
