= Chloris (daughter of Amphion of Orchomenus) =

Minyan Princess according Greek mythology

In Greek mythology, Chloris (/ˈklɔːrɪs/; Ancient Greek: Χλῶρις, romanized: Khlōris, lit. 'from χλωρός khlōros, meaning ‘greenish-yellow, pale green, pale, pallid or fresh') was a Minyan princess.

== Family ==
Chloris was the youngest daughter of King Amphion of Orchomenus, son of Iasus; and of Persephone, daughter of Minyas [sic]. She was often confused with another Chloris, one of the Niobids, children of another Amphion by Niobe.

Chloris was said to have married Neleus and become queen in Pylos. They had twelve sons including Nestor, Alastor and Chromius - named in Book 11 of the Odyssey - a daughter Pero. Chloris also gave birth to Periclymenus while married to Neleus, though by some accounts Periclymenus's father was Poseidon (who was himself Neleus's father as well). Poseidon gave Periclymenus the ability to transform into any animal. Other children include Taurus, Asterius, Pylaon, Deimachus, Eurybius, Phrasius, Eurymenes, Evagoras and Epilaus (or Epileon).

Some says that Chloris was the mother of only three of Neleus' sons (Nestor, Periclymenus and Chromius), whereas the rest were his children by different women, but other accounts explicitly disagree with the statement.

== Mythology ==
Odysseus is said to have encountered Chloris on his journey to Hades. Pausanias describes a painting by Polygnotus of Chloris among other notable women in the underworld, leaning against the knees of her friend Thyia.
