= Eurybius =

In Greek mythology, Eurybius (Ancient Greek: Εὐρύβιος, romanized: Eurybios, lit. 'wide might', 'broad force' or 'abundant strength') was the name of the following personages:

- Eurybius, one of the commanders of horned Lamian Centaurs or Lamian Pheres, offspring of the Lamusides nymphs. He joined Dionysusin his Indian campaign against.
- Eurybius, a Pylian prince as son of King Neleus and Chloris, daughter of the Minyan king Amphion of Orchomenus. His siblings were Pero, Periclymenus, Alastor, Chromius, Asterius, Deimachus, Epilaus, Eurymenes, Evagoras, Phrasius, Pylaon, Taurus and Nestor. Eurybius along with his brothers, except Nestor, were killed by Heracles.
- Eurybius, a prince of Tiryns as son of King Eurystheus and Antimache, daughter of Amphidamas of Arcadia. He was the brother of Admete, Alexander, Iphimedon, Mentor and Perimedes. Eurybius was killed in battle by the Athenians along with his brothers in the war that ensued when Athens refused to deliver the Heraclidae up to Eurystheus. Alternately, Eurybius, Perimedes and his another brother, Eurypylus, were all slain by Heracles when at a sacrificial meal in honor of his Twelve Labors being completed they served him a smaller portion of meat than they did for themselves.
