= Deucalion (mythology) =

Set of mythological Greek characters

In Greek mythology, Deucalion or Deukalion (/dju:keɪli:ən/; Ancient Greek: Δευκαλίων) was the name of the following characters:

- Deucalion, son of Prometheus, survivor of the Deucalian flood.
- Deucalion, son of Zeus and Iodame, daughter of Itonus. He was the brother of Thebe who became the wife of Ogygus.
- Deucalion, son of Minos and Pasiphae, and apparently succeeded his older brother Catreus as King of Crete, father of Idomeneus.
- Deucalion, a soldier killed by Achilles in the Iliad to avenge the death of Patroclus.
- Deucalion, another name of Asterius, came from Pella to join the Argonauts. He was the son of Hypso and probably, Hyperasius. In some accounts, his father was called Hippasus.
