= Epilaus =

Mythical Greek prince

In Greek mythology, Epilaus (Ancient Greek: Ἐπίλαος, lit. 'upon the people' or 'over the people') was a prince of Pylos and son of King Neleus by Chloris, daughter of Amphion. He was the brother to Pero, Taurus, Asterius, Pylaon, Deimachus, Eurybius, Evagoras, Phrasius, Eurymenes, Alastor, Nestor and Periclymenus.

== Mythology ==
Along with his father and other brothers, except Nestor, Epilaus was by killed Heracles during the sack of Pylos.
