= Dotis =

In Greek mythology, Dotis (Ancient Greek: Δωτίς or Δωτίδος) is a name that may refer to:

Male

- Dotis, son of Asterius and Amphictyone.

Female

- Dotis, also called Dotia, mother of Phlegyas by Ares
- Dotis, mother of Syme by Ialysus.
