= Eurymenes =

In Greek mythology, Eurymenes (Ancient Greek: Εὐρυμένης, lit. 'broad and strong' or 'wide of might') was a prince of Pylos and son of King Neleus by Chloris, daughter of Amphion. He was the brother to Pero, Taurus, Asterius, Pylaon, Deimachus, Eurybius, Epilaus, Phrasius, Evagoras, Alastor, Nestor and Periclymenus.

== Mythology ==
Along with his father and other brothers, except Nestor, Eurymenes was killed by Heracles during the sack of Pylos.
