= Pylaon =

In Greek mythology, Pylaon (Ancient Greek: Πυλάων, lit. 'gateway' or 'keeper of the gate') was a prince of Pylos and son of King Neleus by Chloris, daughter of King Amphion of Orchomenus. He was the brother to Pero, Taurus, Asterius, Evagoras, Deimachus, Eurybius, Epilaus, Phrasius, Eurymenes, Alastor, Nestor and Periclymenus.

== Mythology ==
Along with his father and other brothers, except Nestor, Pylaon was killed by Heracles during the sack of Pylos.
