= Evagoras (mythology) =

Greek mythology character

In Greek mythology, Evagoras or Euagoras (Ancient Greek: Εὐαγόρας, romanized: Euăgórās, lit. 'good gatherer' or 'one who harangues/ speaks well in the assembly') may refer to the following personages:

- Evagoras, a prince of Pylos and son of King Neleus by Chloris, daughter of Amphion. He was the brother to Pero, Taurus, Asterius, Pylaon, Deimachus, Eurybius, Epilaus, Phrasius, Eurymenes, Alastor, Nestor and Periclymenus. Along with his father and other brothers, except Nestor, he was killed by Heracles during the sack of Pylos.
- Evagoras, a Trojan prince was one of the children of King Priam of Troy by another woman.
