= Dotus =

In Greek mythology, Dotus (Ancient Greek: Δώτου or Δῶτος, romanized: Dōtos, lit. 'given' or 'gift') was the eponym of Dotium (Dotion) in Thessaly. He was the son of Neonus, son of Hellen, or of Pelasgus.

Alternatively, the other mythical eponyms of the Dotian plain were Dotius, son of Asterius and Amphictyone, daughter of Phthius; or of Dotia, daughter of Elatus.
