= Alastor =

Multiple Greek mythological figures

Alastor (/əˈlæstər, -tɔːr/; Ancient Greek: Ἀλάστωρ, lit. 'avenging spirit') refers to a number of people and concepts in Greek mythology:

- Alastor, an epithet of the Greek God Zeus, according to Hesychius of Alexandria and the Etymologicum Magnum, which described him as the avenger of evil deeds, specifically familial bloodshed. As the personification of a curse, it was also a sidekick of the Erinyes. The name is also used, especially by the tragic writers, to designate any deity or demon who avenges wrongs committed by men. In Euripides' play Electra, Orestes questions an oracle who calls upon him to kill his mother Clytemnestra, and wonders if the oracle was not from Apollo, but some malicious alastor. There was an altar to Zeus Alastor just outside the city walls of Thasos.
  - By the time of the 4th century BC, alastor in Greek had degraded to a generic type of insult, with the approximate meaning of "scoundrel".
- Alastor, a prince of Pylos and son of King Neleus and Chloris, daughter of Amphion. He was the brother of Asterius, Deimachus, Epilaus, Eurybius, Eurymenes, Evagoras, Nestor, Periclymenus, Phrasius, Pylaon, Taurus and Pero. When Heracles took Pylos, he killed Alastor and his brothers, except for Nestor. According to Parthenius of Nicaea, he was to be married to Harpalyce, who, however, was taken from him by her father Clymenus.
- Alastor, a Lycian warrior who was a companion of Sarpedon. He fought in the Trojan War and was slain by the Greek hero Odysseus during the battle.
  - Alastorides is a patronymic form given by Homer to Tros, who was probably a son of the Lycian Alastor mentioned above.
- Alastor, a Pylian soldier who fought under their leader Nestor during the Trojan War. He remembered for having, together with Mecisteus, carried the wounded Teucer off the battlefield as they later did also with Hypsenor.
- Alastor, a black horse belonging to the Greek God Hades. He was one of the four horses drawing Hades's chariot when he rose from the Underworld to bring Persephone down with him. The other three were Orphnaeus, Aethon, and Nycteus.
- Alastor, a vengeful daemon that relentlessly pursues the guilty, punishing their children for the sins of their fathers.
- Alastor, in Christian demonology, came to be considered a kind of possessing entity. He was likened to Nemesis. The name Alastor was also used as a generic term for a class of evil spirits.

== See also ==
- Alastor, or The Spirit of Solitude, a poem by Percy Bysshe Shelley
