= Dotia =

In Greek mythology, Dotia (Ancient Greek: Δωτίας) or Dotis (Δωτίς or Δωτίδος) was the eponym of the city Dotion (Dotium) in Thessaly.

== Family ==
Dotia was the daughter of King Elatus of the Lapiths. By Ares, she bore the infamous Phlegyas.

== Mythology ==
Alternate mythical eponyms of the Dotian plane were Dotius, son of Asterius and Amphictyone, or Dotus, son of either Pelasgus or Neonus, son of Hellen.
