= Dialogues of the Sea Gods =

Work by Lucian of Samosata

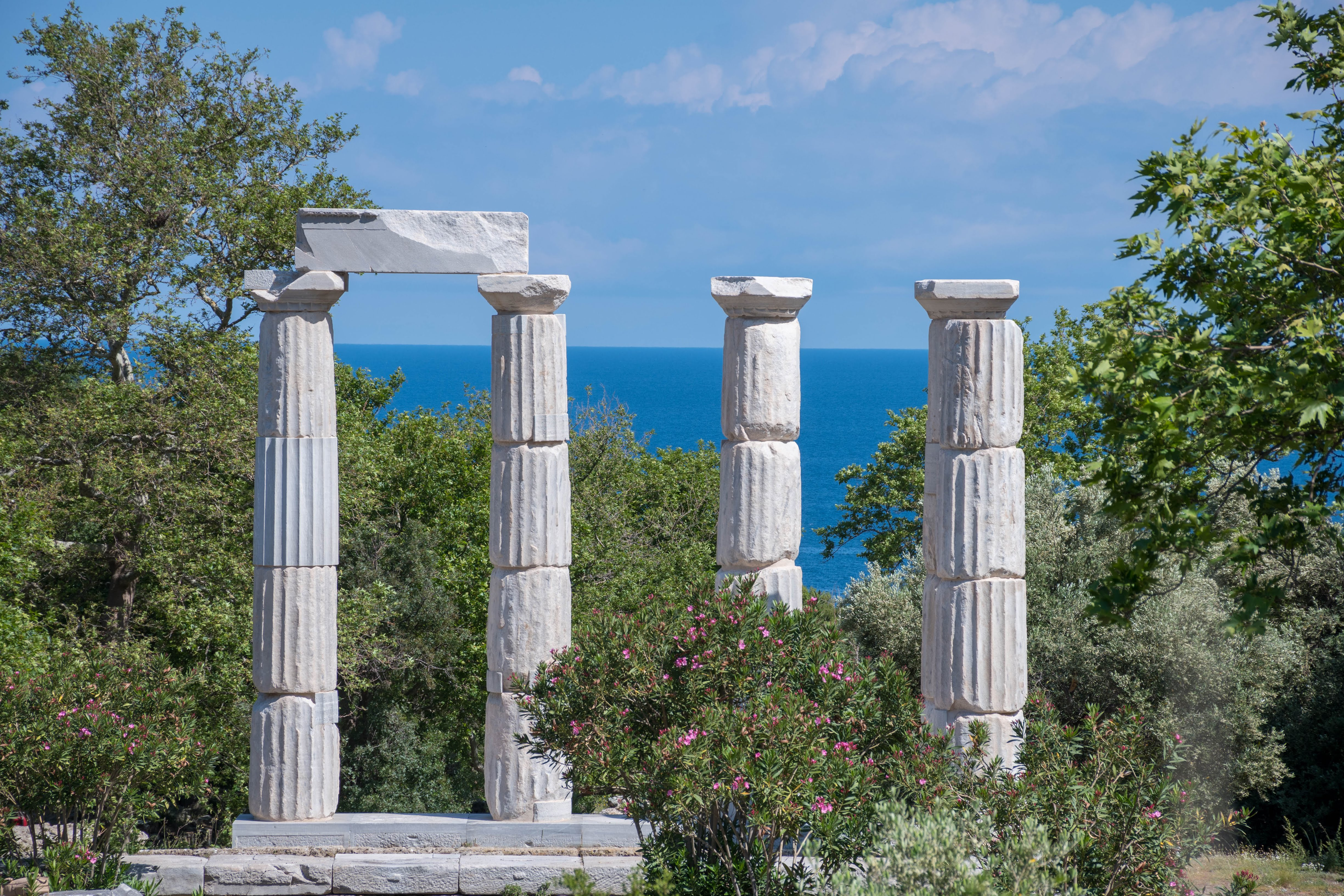
- The Sanctuary of the Great Gods by the sea in Samothrace
- Author: Lucian
- Translator: Various
- Language: Greek
- Genre: Satire
- Publisher: Various
- Publication date: 2nd century AD
- Publication place: Roman Empire

The Dialogues of the Sea Gods (Ancient Greek: Ἐνάλιοι διάλογοι) is a collection of fifteen miniature dialogues by Lucian, a 2nd-century Syrian satirical writer from Samosata, written in ancient Greek. Like with his Dialogues of the Gods, Lucian attempts to mock the Homeric perception of the Greek gods, and highlight the absurdity of the myths told about them.

Despite the name, the Dialogues of the Sea Gods does not strictly feature a marine cast, as sweet-water deities and even mortals have lines.

== The work ==
Like his other works Dialogues of the Gods and the Dialogues of the Dead, the Dialogues of the Sea Gods are tongue-in-cheek imitations of the old myths, recounted from an unfamiliar perspective, and an accurate reflection of Lucian's purely literary interest in the ancient Greek tales told about the gods. While Lucian drew inspiration from the Homeric epics and other poetry like Theocritus or the Homeric Hymns, he seems to have been influenced by ancient paintings he saw as well.

== Deities, nymphs and mortals featured ==
- Alpheus
- Amphitrite
- Amymone
- Doris
- Enipeus
- Galatea
- Galene
- Iphianassa
- Iris
- Menelaus
- Notus
- Panope
- Polyphemus
- Poseidon
- Proteus
- Thalassa
- Thetis
- Triton
- Xanthus
- Zephyrus

== Dialogues ==
=== Dialogue I: Doris and Galatea ===
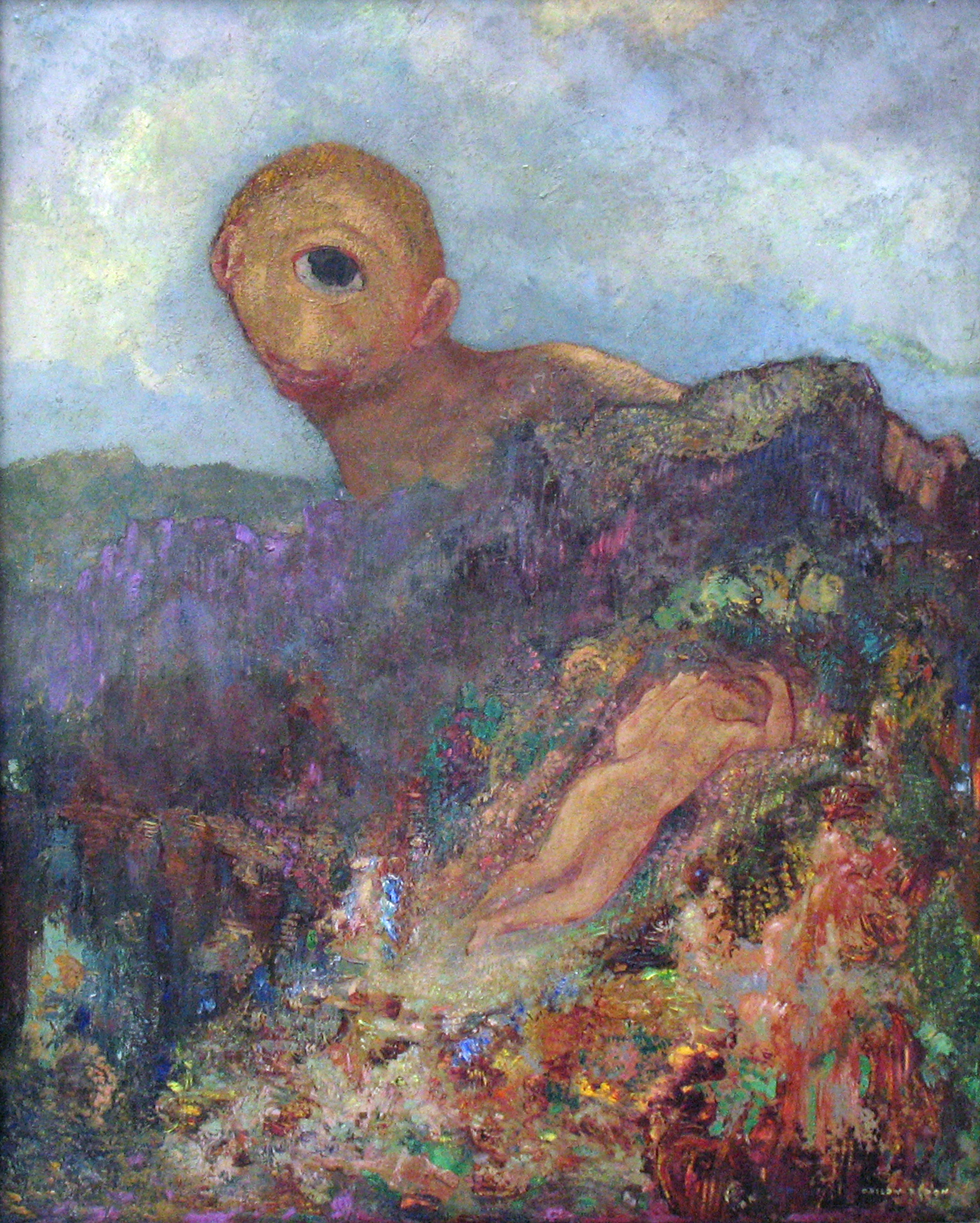
Polyphemus watches Galatea; The Cyclops by Odilon Redon, oil-on-canvas.

Doris teases her sister Galatea about the cyclops Polyphemus being taken with her. Galatea is offeded by her mockery, and reminds her that Polyphemus is a son of the sea-god Poseidon, while Doris retorts that he is still uncomely and uncivilized, and even descent from Zeus himself would not change that. Galatea defends Polyphemus and his physical appearance as becoming, prompting the amused Doris to jest that Galatea is in love with her cyclops after all; vexed, Galatea attributes Doris and the other nymphs' hostility toward her to jealousy, as she (Galatea) alone of all nymphs got the attention of Polyphemus.

Doris accuses Galatea of being conceited, and belittles her looks as commonplace and lacking. Galatea counters by stating that she still got a lover, while the other nymphs remain consortless and bitter about it. Doris' then insults Polyphemus' musical and singing abilities that even embarrassed Echo, concluding that no one would be jealous of such a consort. Galatea asks Doris to present her own comely and music-playing lover. Doris replies that she might not have a lover, but she does not brag about his enviability, and wishes Galatea to be ever happy with her goat-smelling Polyphemus who delights in devouring unlucky strangers.

=== Dialogue II: Cyclops and Poseidon ===
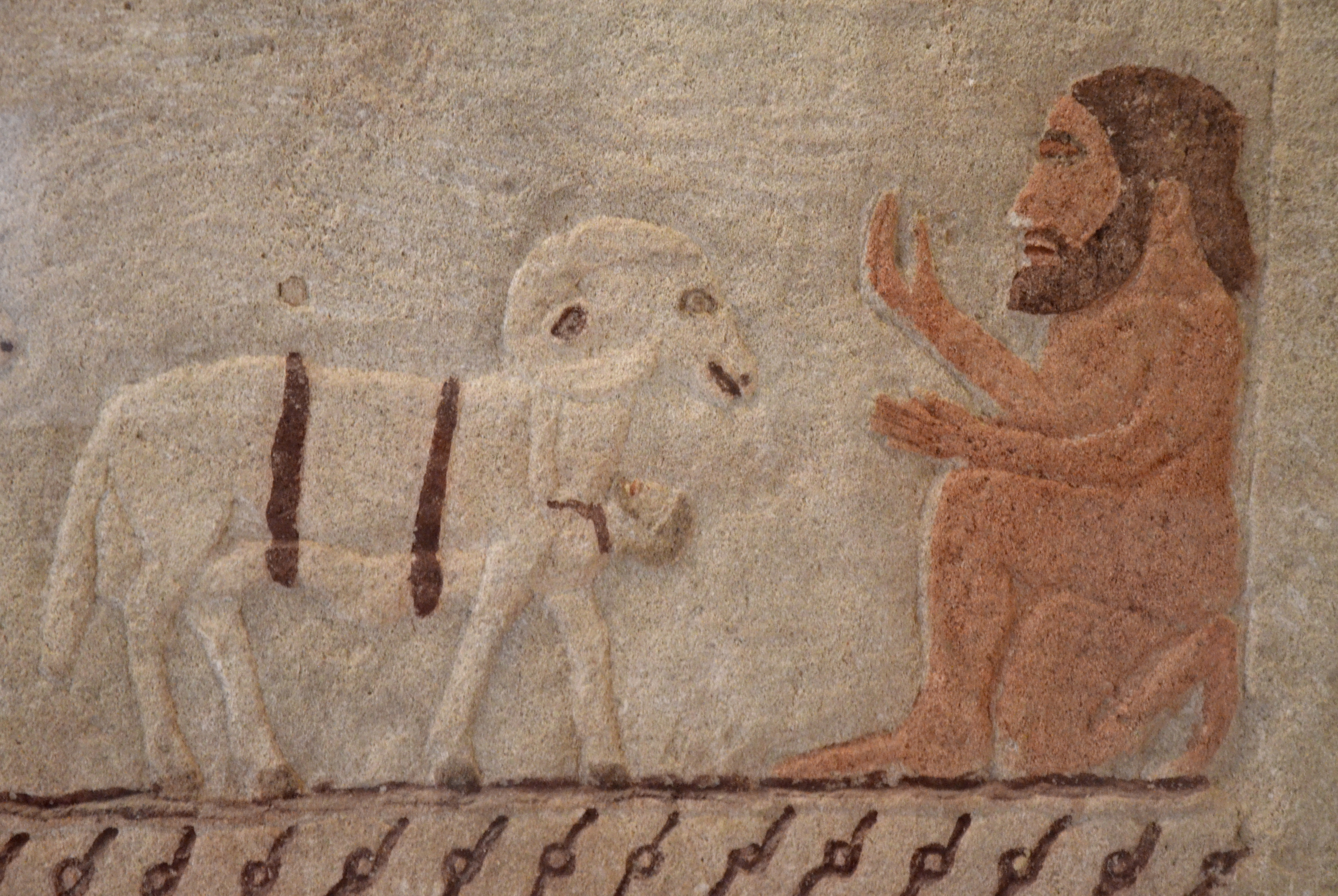
Odysseus’ escape on a 5th-century BC limestone sarcophagus from Cyprus.

Polyphemus goes to his father Poseidon, lamenting his woes of how a stranger got him drunk, and then blinded him while he was sleeping. Poseidon is curious about the man's identity, and Polyphemus answers that the man introduced himself as Nobody, but later Polyphemus heard him call himself Odysseus as he fled. Poseidon recognises the name, while Polyphemus recounts how Odysseus and his men entered his cave to steal his sheep, how he "naturally" ate some of them because they were robbers, and how Odysseus got him drunk and blinded him after he had passed out. He further explains that Odysseus and his men managed to get out when Polyphemus removed the heavy rock from the cave's entry waiting for them, and Poseidon infers that they must have clinged to the sheep's underbellies and bypassed the blinded cyclops this way. Poseidon says Polyphemus should have called out for help, and the cyclops says he did, only to be mistaken for insane by the other cyclopes for shouthing that Nobody had blinded him. Poseidon promises his son that he will avenge him.

=== Dialogue III: Poseidon and Alpheus ===
Poseidon asks Alpheus how come, of all the rivers, he alone keeps his waters sweet even after they have mixed with the salty sea water and emerges again on land. Alpheus explains that it is a love matter, and specifically because he is in love with the Sicilian spring Arethusa. Poseidon asks how he, an Arcadian river, is familiar with a Sicilian spring, but Alpheus declines to answer. (Note: Alpheus fell in love with the nymph Arethusa and chased her; Artemis transformed her into a spring to save the girl, but Alpheus did not stop from trying to mix waters with her.) Poseidon wishes him luck in mingling waters with his beloved.

=== Dialogue IV: Menelaus and Proteus ===
After witnessing Proteus changing many forms, (Note: See Homer's Odyssey.) The king of Sparta Menelaus is incredulous that a sea-deity can transform into fire, and believes Proteus was using some sort of trick instead of genuine metamorphosis. Proteus assures him that indeed he can transform into anything, and challenges Menelaus to touch him while he is turned into fire so he can see for himself whether it is true fire or not; Menelaus declines the offer. Proteus brings up how octopodes are able to perfectly mimic their surroundings in order to hide, but Menelaus remains unconvinced how one can be water and fire at the same time.

=== Dialogue V: Poseidon and dolphins ===
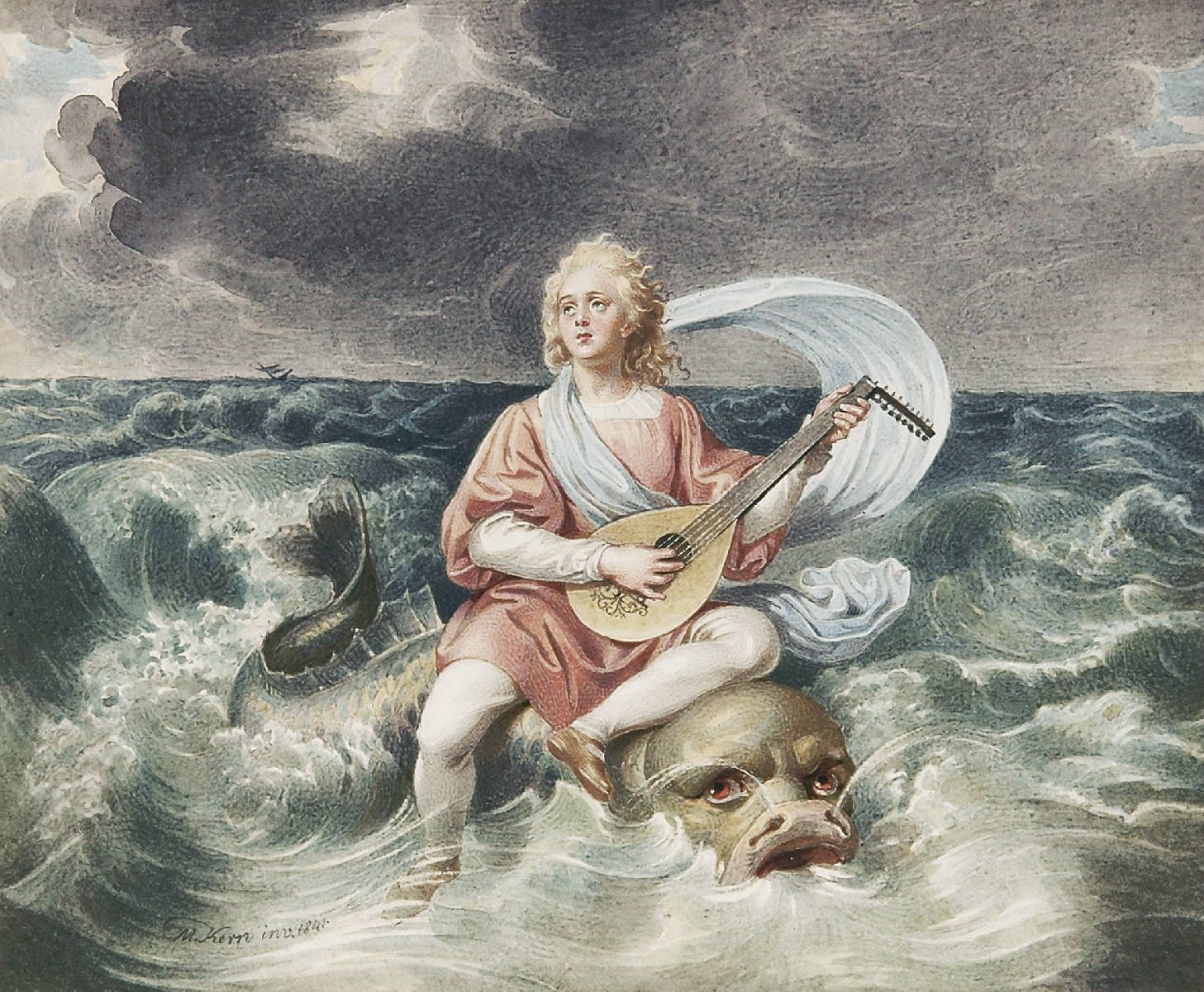
Arion and the dolphin, 1841 watercolour by Matthäus Kern.

Poseidon chats with some dolphins. He congratulates them for being compassionate, bringing up examples of how they brought Melicertes to the shore after he and his mother Ino fell into the sea, and how now they have saved the musician Arion from certain doom. The dolphins explain that they themselves were humans once before Dionysus turned them into dolphins after he defeated them. (Note: Some Tyrsenian pirates once kidnapped Dionysus for ransom, but he turned them into dolphins as punishment.) The dolphins recount how Arion, after playing music in the court of Periander of Corinth, embarked on a ship to return to his homeland Methymna in Lesbos to show off his new riches; he was carrying so much gold and silver with him that the sailors decided to rob and kill him. Arion requested to be allowed to dress up and sing his own dirge, and he was granted that one wish. Once he was finished, he jumped into the sea for a quick death, but the dolphins saved him and escorted him to safety, charmed by his music. Poseidon praises their love for the high arts.

=== Dialogue VI: Poseidon and Nereids ===
Following Helle's death, Poseidon orders the Nereids to bring her body ashore in either the Troad or the Chersonese so the locals can bury her, and name the narrow strait she drowned in Hellespont ('sea of Helle') after her. His wife Amphitrite suggests a burial at sea after what the girl went through because of her cruel stepmother Ino, but Poseidon insists; besides, he says, Ino will eventually suffer a similar case once her husband hunts her down, though he notes they will have to save Ino too for Dionysus' sake. The Nereids wonder why Helle fell off the ram she was riding and died, while her brother Phrixus made it. Poseidon thinks it was because he was stronger and more resilient than his scared and fatigued sister. The nymphs think that the children's mother Nephele ought to have intervened and saved her, but Poseidon answers that Fate is stronger than Nephele.

=== Dialogue VII: Panope and Galene ===
The Nereid nymphs Panope and Galene gossip about Eris, the goddess of discord. Panope informs Galene that Eris was not invited at the wedding of Peleus and Thetis—during which Galene was tasked by Poseidon to keep the seas calm, so she was not present—so she crept in and threw a golden apple with the words to the fairest engraved on it in the direction of Hera, Athena and Aphrodite. Hermes picked it up and read it out loud, and the Nereids present did not dare to press a claim on it against the three great goddesses. Zeus prevented a full blown fight from taking place among the three, but turned down the option to be himself the judge of it and sent them to Paris, a mortal shepherd from Troy, to award the apple. Panope ends the story saying the goddesses have scheduled for today to travel to Mount Ida and find Paris. Galene remarks that she does not expect anyone but Aphrodite to win the contest, unless the judge is blind.

=== Dialogue VIII: Triton and Poseidon ===
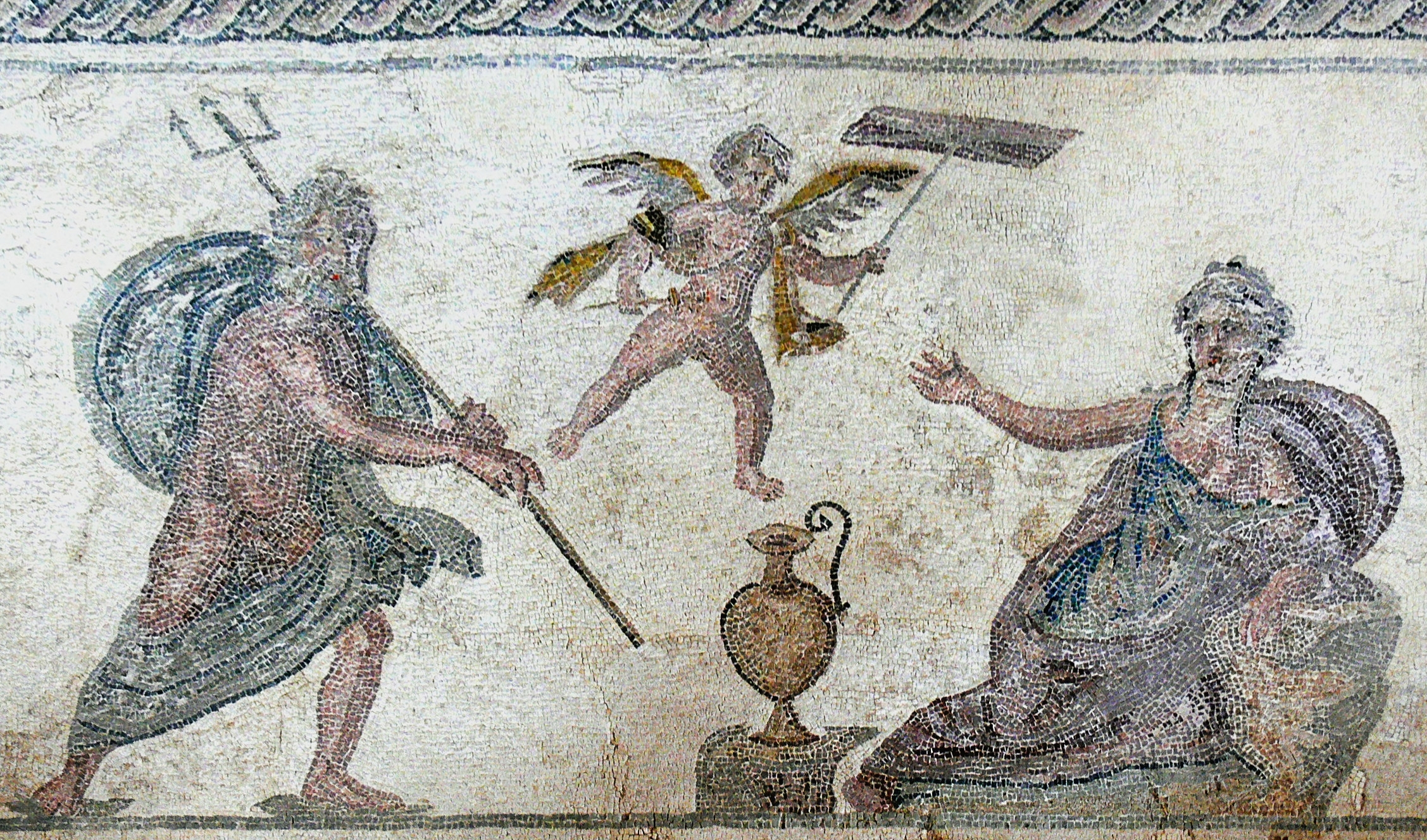
Roman mosaic of Poseidon and Amymone from Nea Paphos, Cyprus.

Triton tells his father of the beautiful maiden, Amymone, who goes to collect water from Lake Lerna every day. She is one of the Danaïdes, the fifty daughters of Danaus, and their father has raised them to strive for hard work; on top of that, their city Argos is experiencing a deadly drought at the moment and they urgently need the water. Intrigued by Triton's words, Poseidon departs for Lerna on a dolphin. As they lay awaiting there, the lovely Amymone arrives; smitten, Poseidon orders Triton to take hold of her. Amymone yells, afraid Triton is an agent of her uncle Aegyptus, but Triton informs her it is Poseidon. Amymone is then scared that she will drown as Triton makes his way to the sea, until Poseidon reassures the girl no harm will come to her; he further promises he will make a spring gush forth that will take her name, and that she shall be the only one among her sisters who will not be forced to spend an eternity filling a tub with water in the Underworld. (Note: The Danaïdes, after being forced to marry the fifty sons of Aegyptus, were tasked by their father to kill their husband on their wedding night. Hypermestra alone did not comply. Late traditions have them fill a leaking pot with water for an eternity in Hades; Hypermestra is not included, for she did not kill her husband.)

=== Dialogue IX: Iris and Poseidon ===
The rainbow goddess Iris brings a message from Zeus to Poseidon; that he is to fix the small underwater floating island immovable in the Aegean Sea and bring it to the surface so that Zeus' pregnant lover Leto can give birth on it. Poseidon asks why Leto cannot do so anywhere else, and Iris says that is because Hera made all the land swear it would not give Leto refuge anywhere, but this floating island is not bound by the oath due to staying hidden. Poseidon immediately complies and orders the wandering island to hold still. He then tells Iris that all is ready for Leto to come and give birth to her twins (Artemis and Apollo).

=== Dialogue X: Xanthus and Thalassa ===
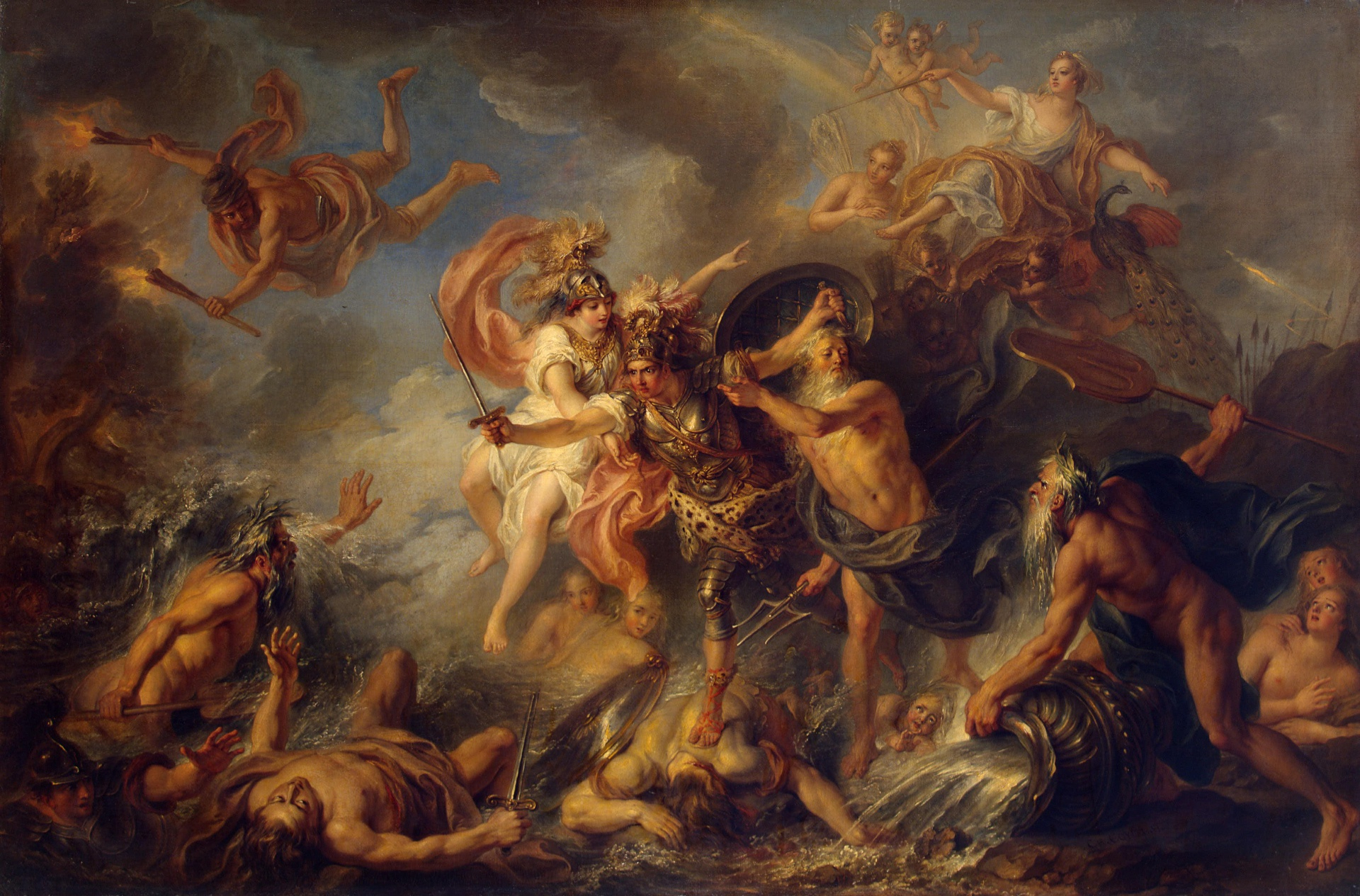
Achilles and Xanthus, 1737 oil-on-canvas painting by Charles-Antoine Coypel, Hermitage Museum.

The river-god Xanthus asks Thalassa (the Sea) to heal his burn wounds, and laments what has happened to him. Thalassa inquires what has befell him, and Xanthus explains that the hero Achilles was slaying so many Trojan warriors and throwing their dead bodies into the river that he clogged up. Angered by this, and wanting to help the poor Trojans, he attacked Achilles only to be attacked in return by Hephaestus, who used his fire to boil Xanthus and burn his trees and fishes. (Note: See Homer's Iliad.) Thalassa berates Xanthus for attacking Achilles, who is her grandson as the son of Thetis. Xanthus complains that he had the right to help the Trojans, and Thalassa retorts that Hephaestus had the right to assist Achilles too.

=== Dialogue XI: Notus and Zephyrus ===
The winds converse. Notus asks Zephyrus whether the cow that Hermes is leading to Egypt is the one Zeus had sex with. Zephyrus affirms so, and adds that she was not a cow, but a daughter of Inachus whom Hera transformed into a cow out of jealousy when she saw Zeus' love for her. Furthermore, Zeus had the winds keep the sea calm so that the pregnant girl could cross safely to Egypt where she will be worshipped as a goddess. As they watch, the cow is transformed back into a woman, while they notice that Hermes' youthful face has now sharp canine features, but they decide not to pry into it.

=== Dialogue XII: Doris and Thetis ===
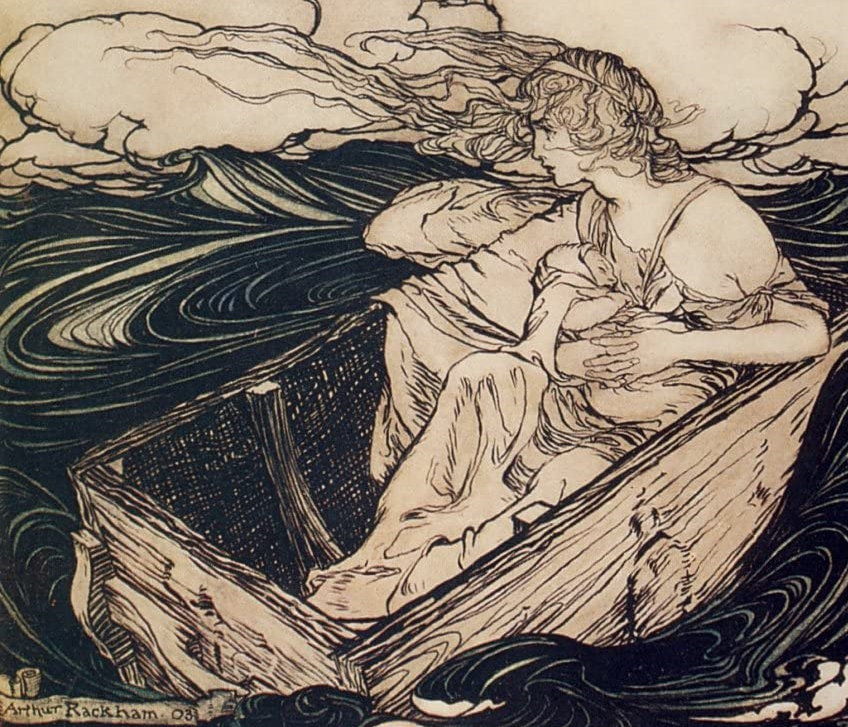
Danaë and Perseus, 1903 drawing by Arthur Rackham.

Doris asks Thetis why is she crying, and Thetis replies it is because she just saw King Acrisius lock his daughter Danaë and Danaë's newborn baby into a chest which he then threw into the sea from a ship as she begged her father to at least show mercy to the infant; previously, as Thetis explains, Acrisius had locked up his virgin daughter inside a chamber where no man could touch her, but Zeus visited her in the form of liquid gold and impregnated her anyway. When Acrisius found out, he threw a temper tantrum and doomed his daughter and grandson. Doris asks whether mother and son are dead, but Thetis says the chest is still floating near the island of Seriphos. Doris suggests they divert the chest toward the Seriphian fishermen so that they will take care of them. Thetis agrees.

=== Dialogue XIII: Enipeus and Poseidon ===
Enipeus is cross with Poseidon who took his form in order to seduce and deflower the unassuming princess Tyro, who was deeply in love with Enipeus. Poseidon on the other hand accuses Enipeus of being haughty and arrogant against Tyro, for he rejected her on multiple occasions in the past and delighted in making her miserable while she swam enamoured around in his waters. Enipeus claims this is no valid justification for Poseidon to seduce Tyro in this manner and deprive him of the princess, but Poseidon insists that no ill will come to Tyro just because she is mistanken on account of the identity of her lover—Poseidon revealed himself to her before he left. Enipeus brings up how the revelation saddened Tyro, and he himself suffered injustice because he did not get to have the princess. Poseidon replies that is because he did not want her in the first place.

=== Dialogue XIV: Triton and Nereids ===
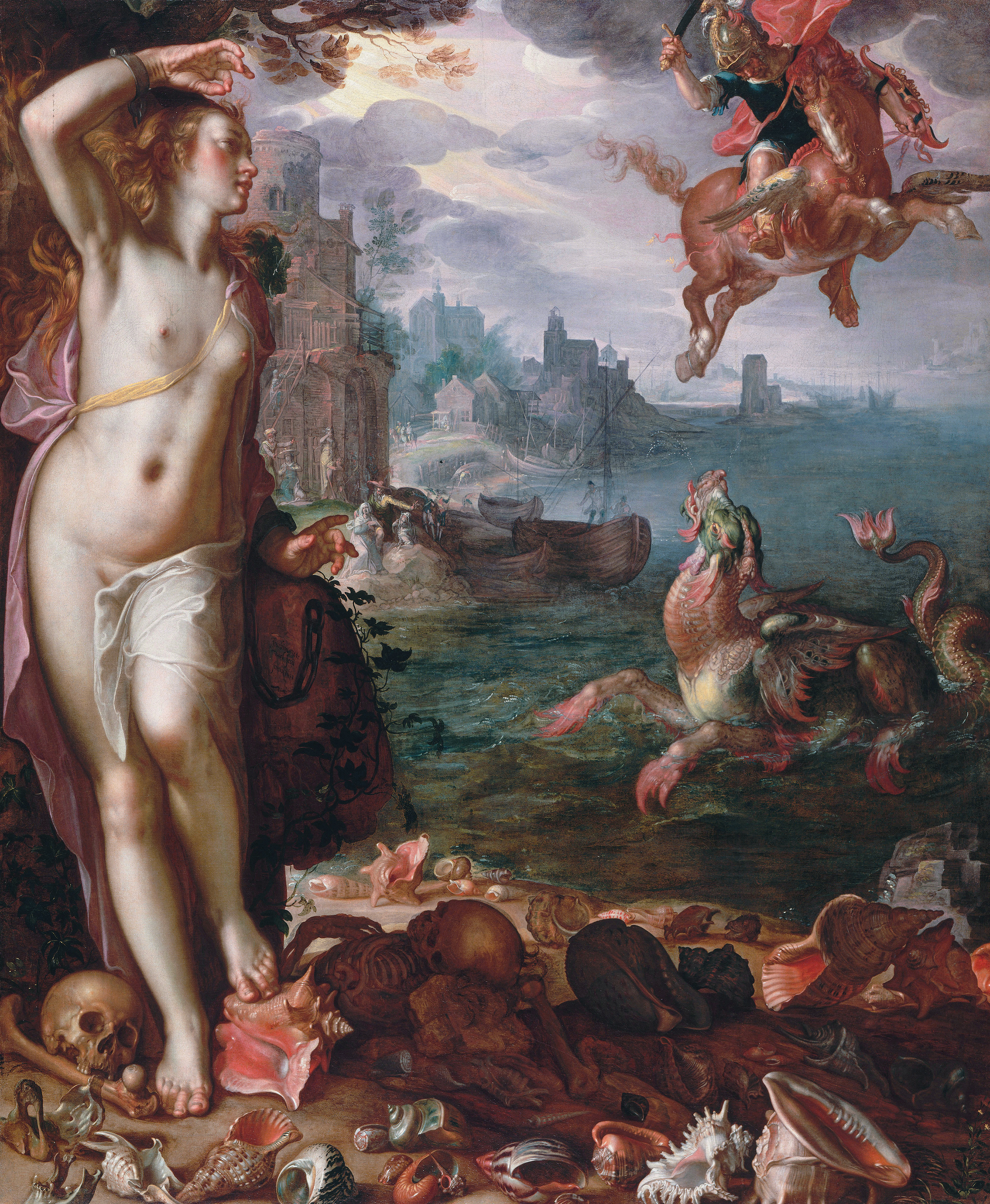
Perseus and Andromeda, 1611 oil-on-canvas by Joachim Wtewael, Louvre.

Triton informs the Nereids that the sea-monster they sent against Andromeda the daughter of Cepheus has been slaughtered before it could bring her harm. The Nereids ask if it was Cepheus himself who slew it after using his daughter as bait, but Triton replies that it was in fact Perseus, the same Perseus that they themselves had saved years ago as an infant when he and his mother Danaë were cast into the sea inside a chest to drown. The Nereid Iphianassa says he ought not have repaid their generosity by slaying their beast. Triton gives a short summary of Perseus' adventures; he was sent on a mission against the Gorgons by some king, and when he arrived at their den, he cut Medusa's head off as she lay asleep while Athena assisted him by using her shield as a mirror so that Perseus would not be petrified by gazing directly at Medusa.

As he was flying back home, he noticed Andromeda chained to a rock to be devoured by the Nereids' beast, and falling in love with her he dared to slay it by cutting it down with his sword and then using Medusa's severed head to turn it to stone. With Andromeda safe and sound, the two are to be married and move to Perseus' homeland. Reflecting on the events, Iphianassa says that Andromeda was not at fault that her mother Cassiopeia foolishly competed with the nymphs in beauty after all, but Doris reminds her that it was so that the hubristic queen would be distressed as punishment. Iphianassa replies that Cassiopeia's petty offences do not matter that much, and that they should be happy about the wedding.

=== Dialogue XV: Zephyrus and Notus ===
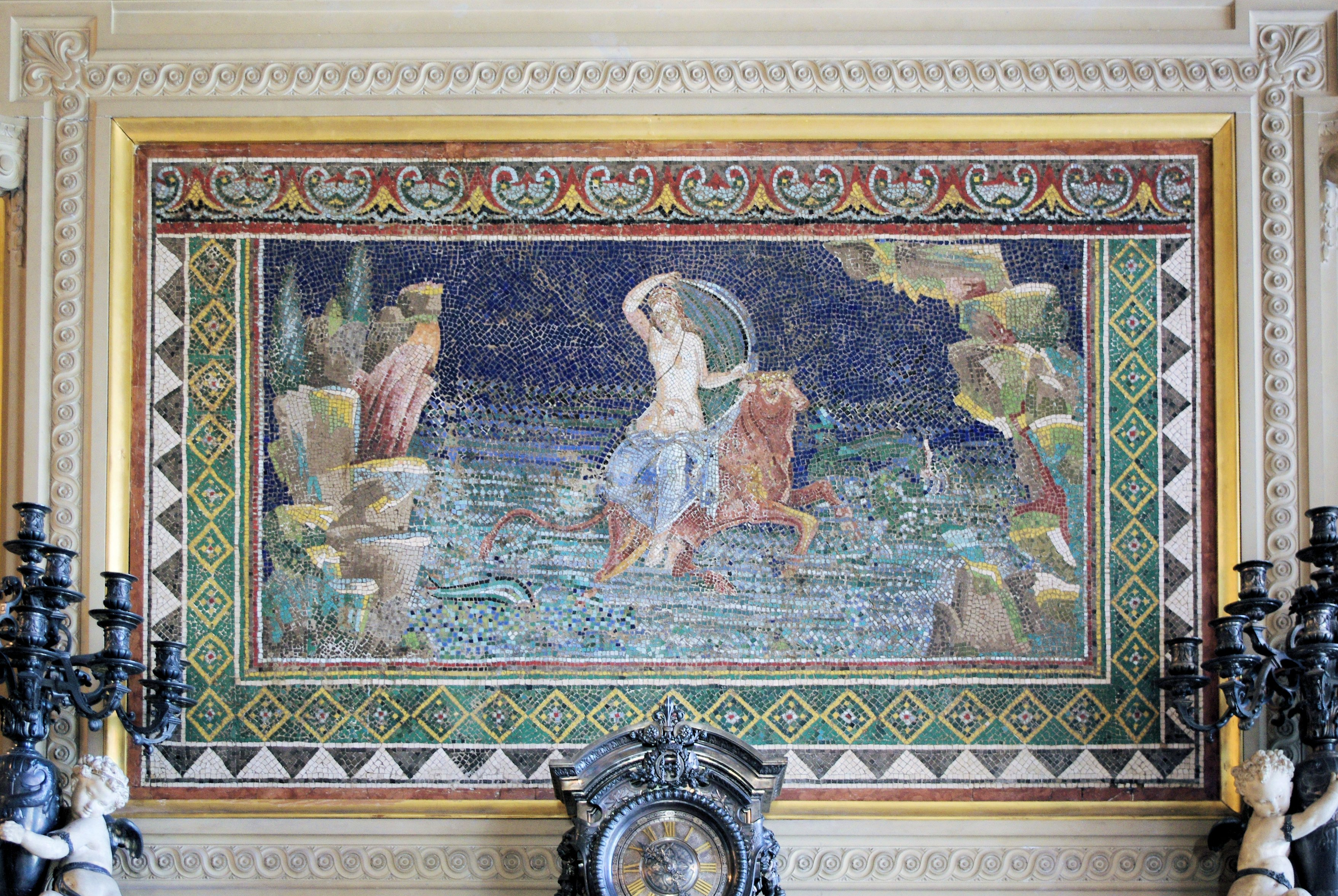
A first-century Roman mosaic of Europa's abduction from Stabiae.

Zephyrus and Notus discuss Zeus' abduction of the Sidonian princess Europa that he has just witnessed, describing it as the most marvellous pocession he has ever seen. As Zephyrus explains to Notus, Zeus fell in love with the princess so he took the form of a white bull and approached the beach Europa and her friends were hanging around at. The moment Europa climbed on top of the bull Zeus rushed to the sea and swam away, with the terrified girl holding on to him.

Zephyrus then gives a vivid and detailed description of the pocession; the sea stilled and the wind-gods stopped blowing, many Erotes flew around holding torches and singing wedding hymns, half-nude Nereids appeared riding on dolphins while Tritons and other marine animals danced around Europa and the bull, Poseidon and Amphitrite on a chariot made way for the bull, and finally two Tritons carried Aphrodite on a seashell, who was throwing flowers at the couple. This went on all the way to Crete, where Zeus resumed his casual form and lead the blushing Europa to the Dictaean Cave to have sex with her there while the winds dispersed. Notus expresses jealousy at Zephyrus for having witnessed all those interesting things while all he saw was griffins, elephants and black people.

== Bibliography ==
- Anonymous, Homeric Hymns, in The Homeric Hymns and Homerica with an English Translation by Hugh G. Evelyn-White, Cambridge, MA., Harvard University Press; London, William Heinemann Ltd. 1914. Online version at the Perseus Digital Library.
- Grimal, Pierre (1987). The Dictionary of Classical Mythology. Wiley-Blackwell. ISBN 0-631-13209-0.
- Homer, The Iliad with an English Translation by A.T. Murray, PhD in two volumes. Cambridge, MA., Harvard University Press; London, William Heinemann, Ltd. 1924. Online version at the Perseus Digital Library.
- Homer, The Odyssey with an English Translation by A.T. Murray, PH.D. in two volumes. Cambridge, MA., Harvard University Press; London, William Heinemann, Ltd. 1919. Online version at the Perseus Digital Library.
- Lucian, Dialogues of the Dead. Dialogues of the Sea-Gods. Dialogues of the Gods. Dialogues of the Courtesans with an English translation by M. D. MacLeod. Loeb Classical Library 431. Cambridge, MA: Harvard University Press, 1961. Available online at Loeb Classical Library.
- Richter, Daniel S. (2017). "Chapter 21: Lucian of Samosata". In Richter, Daniel S.; Johnson, William A. (eds.). The Oxford Handbook of the Second Sophistic. Vol. 1. Oxford, England: Oxford University Press. doi:10.1093/oxfordhb/9780199837472.013.26. ISBN 978-0-19-983747-2.
