= Hypso =

Mother of the Argonauts Amphion and Asterius in Greek mythology

In Greek mythology, Hypso, from Pellene in Achaea, was the mother of the Argonauts Amphion and Asterius (Deucalion) by Hyperasius, son of Pelles. In some sources, the father of these men were Hippasus. Hypso gave birth to her sons at one birth and she could not tell one apart from the other because of their likeness. This suggests that they were identical twins.
