= Chloris (daughter of Amphion of Thebes) =

Greek mythological figure

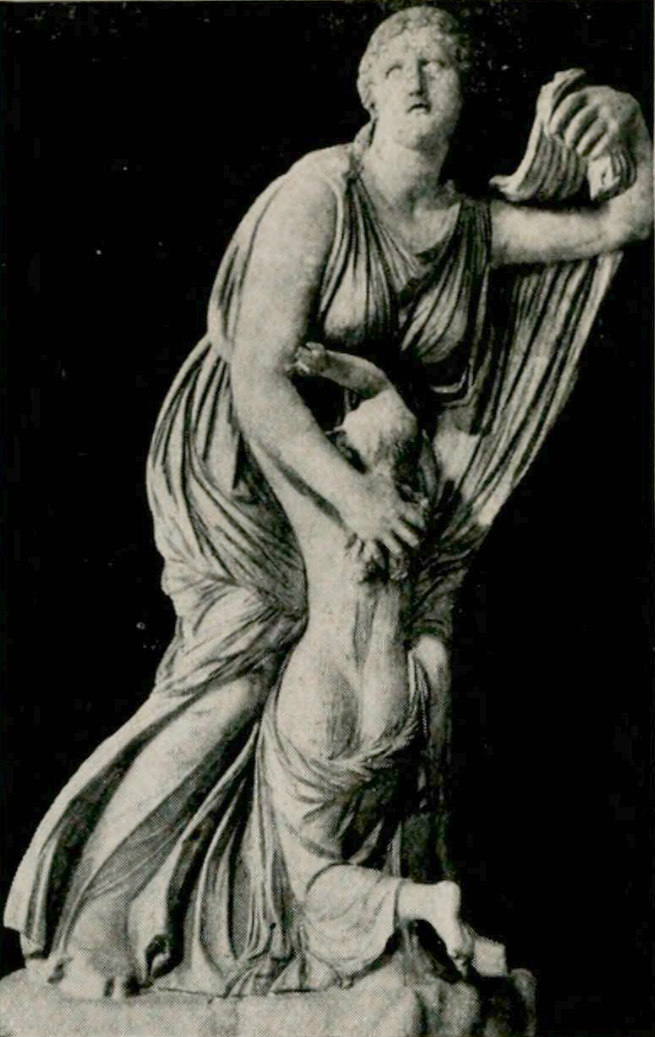
A statue of Niobe protecting Chloris, her youngest daughter

In Greek mythology, Chloris (/ˈklɔːrɪs/; Ancient Greek: Χλῶρις, romanized: Khlôris, from Ancient Greek: χλωρός, romanized: khlōrós, lit. 'pale green') also called Meliboea, was one of Niobe and Amphion's fourteen children, known as the Niobids. She was often identified with another Chloris, daughter of another Amphion, who became the wife of Neleus of Pylos.

== Mythology ==
Meliboea was the only one (or one of two) spared when Artemis and Apollo killed the Niobids in retribution for Niobe's insult to their mother Leto, bragging that she had many children while Leto had only two. Meliboea was so frightened by the ordeal, she turned permanently pale, changing her name to Chloris ("pale one"). Pausanias mentioned a statue of Chloris near the sanctuary of Leto in Argos. In another version, she is a daughter of Teiresias. According to Pausanias, she was a victor at the first Heraean Games organised by Hippodameia. The version of a Niobid surviving is attributed to the poetess Telesilla, followed by Sophocles in his lost drama Niobe.
