= Phronius =

In Greek mythology, Phronius (Ancient Greek: Φρονίοιο means "to be minded") may refer to two individuals:

- Phronius, a Triccan prince as son of King Deimachus of Thessaly, and brothers to Autolycus, Demoleon (Deileon), and Phlogius.These men joined Heracles in his expedition against the Amazons but they never returned and later they joined the Argonauts.
- Phronius, father of Noemon, an Ithacan.
