= Phthius (founder of Phthiotis) =

Greek mythological figure

In Greek mythology, Phthius (Ancient Greek: Φθῖος, romanized: Phthîos) was the eponymous ruler of Phthiotis in southern Thessaly.

== Family ==
Phthius was the son of Poseidon and Larisa, daughter of Pelasgus. He was the brother of Achaeus and the younger Pelasgus.

Phthius became the father of Amphictyone who bore to Asterius a son, Dotius (Dotis). The latter being one of the possible eponyms of Dotium (Dotion) in Thessaly.

== Mythology ==
Phthius together with his brothers, left Achaean Argos with a Pelasgian contingent for Thessaly. They then established a colony on the said country naming it after themselves. The only single source of the accounts of Phthius is recounted by Dionysius of Halicarnassus in his Roman Antiquities about the Pelasgian race's migration.

“In the sixth generation afterwards, leaving the Peloponnesus, they [Pelasgians] removed to the country which was then called Haemonia and now Thessaly. The leaders of the colony were Achaeus, Phthius and Pelasgus, the sons of Larisa and Poseidon. When they arrived in Haemonia they drove out the barbarian inhabitants and divided the country into three parts, calling them, after the names of their leaders, Phthiotis, Achaia and Pelasgiotis.”

— Dionysius of Halicarnassus, Antiquitates Romanae, 1.17.3
