= Acidusa =

Greek mythological wife of Scamander

In Greek mythology, Acidusa (Ancient Greek: Ἀκίδουσα, lit. 'barbed being') was the Boeotian wife of Scamander, son of Deimachus and Glaucia. By her husband, Acidusa had three daughters who for one reason or another came to be regarded as minor divinities and were worshipped under the name of "the Maidens."

== Mythology ==
Scamander obtained a tract of land in Boeotia across which flowed two rivers. He named one of the rivers Glaucia in honor of his mother and the other Scamander, not only after his own name but also that of his maternal grandfather, the river-god Scamander in the plain of Troy. Acidusa benefited from her husband's habit of naming places after his family. He commemorated her by naming a Boeotian spring Acidusa.
