= Deïmachus (mythology) =

Multiple Greek mythological figures

Deïmachus (Ancient Greek: Δηΐμαχος or Δαΐμαχος) may refer to several figures in Greek mythology:

- Deimachus, father of Enarete, wife of Aeolus.
- Deimachus, a Pylian prince and one of the sons of King Neleus and Chloris, daughter of Amphion. He was the brother of Alastor, Asterius, Epilaus, Eurybius, Eurymenes, Evagoras, Nestor, Periclymenus, Phrasius, Pylaon, Taurus and Pero. Along with his father and other brothers, except Nestor, he was by killed Heracles during the sack of Pylos.
- Deimachus, king of Tricca in Thessaly. He was the father of Autolycus, Deileon (Demoleon) and Phlogius, comrades of Heracles on his campaign against the Amazons.
- Deimachus, a Boeotian son of Eleon and a companion of Heracles. When the hero took part an expedition against Troy, Deimachus fell in battle. He left a son Scamander born from his lover of Glaucia, daughter of the river god Scamander.

== See also ==
- Deimachus was also the name of the 3rd century BCE ambassador of the Seleucid Empire in India.
