= Alcidice =

Greek mythological figure

Alcidice (Ancient Greek: Ἀλκιδίκη, romanized: Alkidíkē) was, in Greek mythology, an Arcadian princess as the daughter of King Aleus. She married Salmoneus, king of Elis, and bore a daughter, Tyro. After her death, Salmoneus married Sidero.
