= Dyme =

Ancient Greek city in the Peloponnese

Coordinates: 38°08′41″N 21°33′05″E

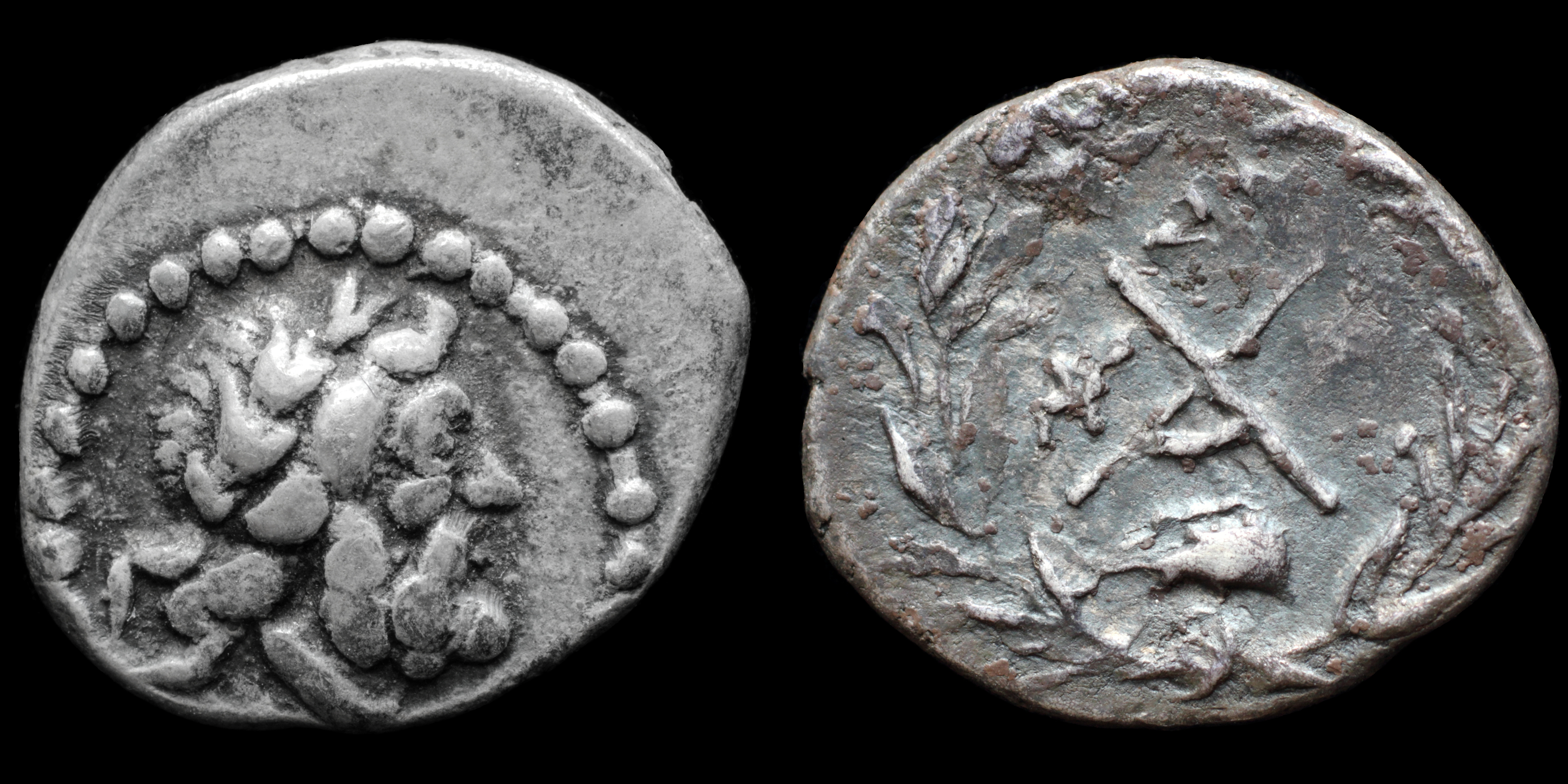

First side of the image: O: laureate head of Zeus
Second side of the image: R: fish under (AX) monogram, (APT) left and ΔΥ up all within wreath
silver hemidrachm of Achaean League struck in Dyme around 86 BC. Coin was struck with worn dies. ref.: BMC 29, Sear GCV 2974, Clerk 55, BCD Peloponnesos 482

Dyme (Ancient Greek: Δύμη), or Dymae, was a town and polis (city-state) of ancient Achaea, and the most westerly of the 12 Achaean cities, from which circumstance it is said to have derived its name. The location of Dyme is near the modern Kato Achaia.

== Location ==
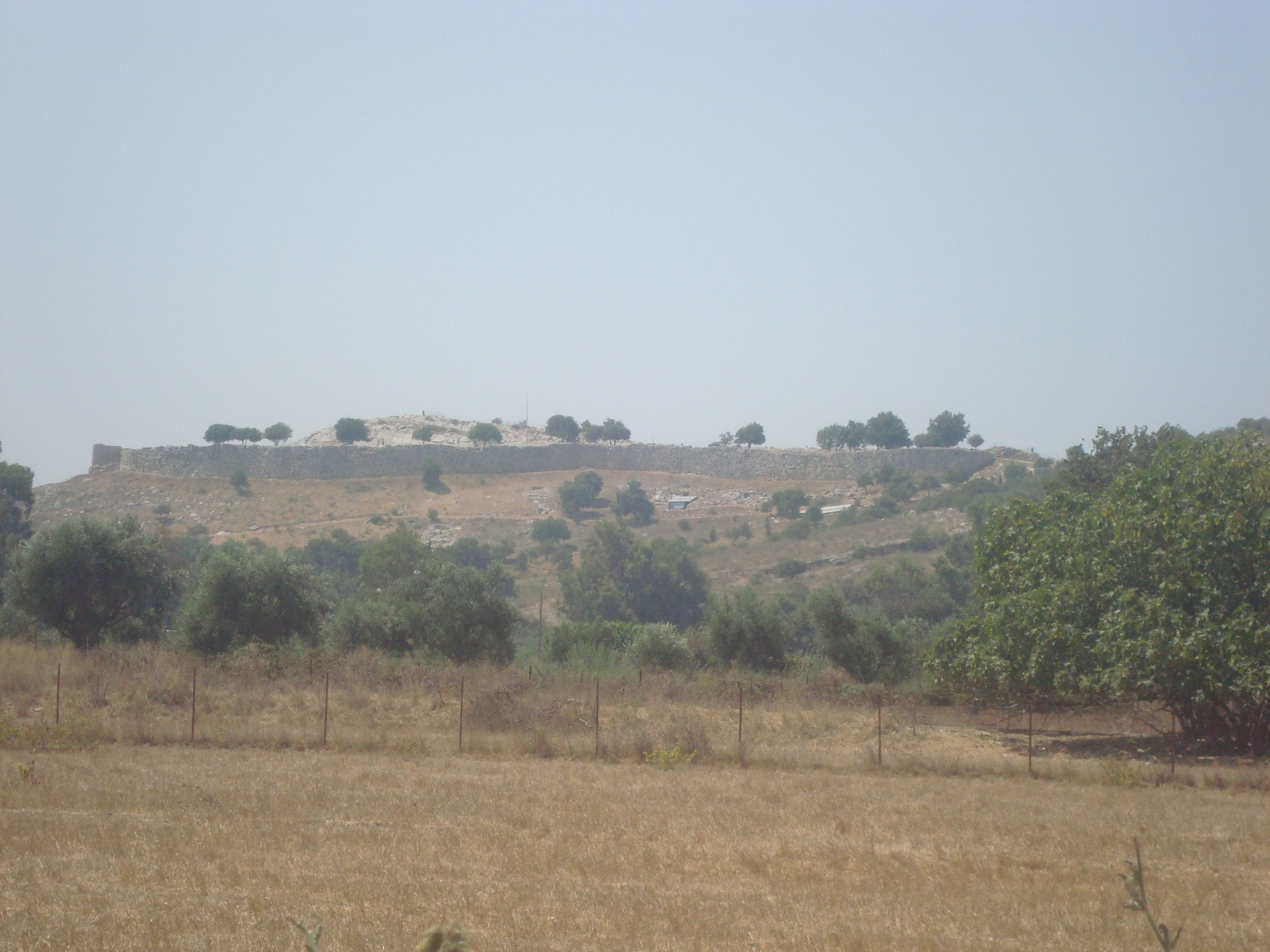
The acropolis from the Mycenaean period, known as Teichos Dymaion, or the Dymaean Wall.

It was situated near the coast, according to Strabo 60 stadia from the promontory Araxus, and according to Pausanias 30 stadia from the river Larisus, which separated its territory from Elis.

Map of ancient Achaea (with place names in Greek)

== Names ==
It is further said by Strabo to have been formed out of a union of 8 villages, one of which was called Teuthea (Τευθέα); and it is probable, that some of the different names, by which the city is said to have been called, were originally the names of the separate villages. Thus, its more ancient name is stated by Pausanias to have been Paleia (Πάλεια), and by Strabo to have been Stratus or Stratos (Στρατός). The poet Antimachus gave it the epithet Cauconis, which was derived by some from the iron Caucon in the neighbourhood, and by others from the Caucones, who were supposed to have originally inhabited this district.

== History ==
=== Greek history ===
The first resident of note was Oebotas who was said to be the first Achaean to win at the Ancient Olympic Games. He was not honored for his victory by the Achaeans and legendarily cursed the Achaeans to never win the Olympics for that and the Achaeans did not have an Olympic winner until Sostratus of Pellene won the race. Thucydides indicates it was near a great naval battle of the Peloponnesian War and that some fleeing the battle found shelter there. After the death of Alexander the Great, Dyme fell into the hands of Cassander, but his troops were driven out of the city by Aristodemus, the general of Antigonus, 314 BCE. This city had the honour, along with Patrae, of reviving the Achaean League in 280 BCE; and about this time or shortly afterwards its population received an accession from some of the inhabitants of Olenus, who abandoned their town. A battle took place at Dyme in 226 BCE between the Spartans under King Cleomenes III and the Achaean League under the command of Aratus of Sicyon and ended in a Spartan victory. In the Social War (220-217 BCE), the territory of Dyme, from its proximity to Elis, was frequently laid waste by the Eleans.

=== Roman era ===
In the First Macedonian War Cycliadas and Philip V of Macedon would prepare for an attack on Elis near Dyme; but in consequence of Dyme being the only one of the Achaean cities which espoused the cause of the Macedonian king, it was plundered by the Romans under Publius Sulpicius Galba Maximus. From this blow it never recovered; and it is said to have been without inhabitants when Pompey settled here a large number of Cilician pirates. In the civil wars that followed, some of these new inhabitants were expelled from their lands and resumed their old occupations. Both Strabo and Pliny the Elder call Dyme a Roman colony; but this statement appears to be a mistake, since it is known that Dyme was one of the towns placed under the authority of Patrae, when it was made a Roman colony by Augustus; and it is expressly told that no other Achaean town except Patrae was allowed the privilege of self-government.

== See also ==
- Dymaean Wall
- List of ancient Greek cities
