= Scamander (disambiguation) =

Scamander is a river god in Greek mythology.

Scamander may also refer to:

- Scamander, Tasmania, a small town at the mouth of the Scamander River on Tasmania's northeast coast
- Karamenderes River in Asia Minor, previously called the Scamander River
- Newt Scamander, the pseudonym used by J. K. Rowling when she wrote Fantastic Beasts and Where to Find Them, as well as a character in its adaptations
- Scamander of Boeotia, a mythical Greek king

== See also ==
- Skamander, a Polish group of experimental poets
