= Olurus =

Town of ancient Achaea

Olurus or Olouros (Ancient Greek: Ὄλουρος) was a town of ancient Achaea, dependent upon Pellene. It is cited by numerous ancient authors, including Xenophon, Pliny the Elder, Pomponius Mela, and Stephanus of Byzantium.

Its site is unlocated.
