= Iodame =

Daughter of Itonus in Greek mythology

In Greek mythology, Iodame or Iodama (/aɪˈɒdəmiː/; Ancient Greek: Ἰοδάμη or Ἰοδάμα, lit. 'heifer calf of Io') was a Thessalian princess as the daughter of King Itonus of Iton in Phthiotis. She was the granddaughter of Amphictyon.

== Family ==
Iodame was the mother of Thebe by Zeus while some authors, adds a son, Deucalion.

== Mythology ==
Iodame was a priestess at the temple of Athena Itonia built by her father. When she trespassed the precinct one night, Athena appeared in front of her; at the sight of Medusa's head which was worked in the goddess' garment, Iodame turned into a block of stone. After this, a priestess lit the fire on the altar every day, repeating thrice: "Iodame lives and demands fire".

An alternate story of Athene and Iodama relates that both were daughters of Itonius. They became jealous of each other and started fighting, which resulted in Iodame being killed by Athena. The story is similar to that of Athena and Pallas (daughter of Triton).
