= Glaucia =

Daughter of Scamander in Greek mythology

In Greek mythology, Glaucia (Ancient Greek: Γλαυκία, romanized: Glaukia, lit. 'blue-gray', 'gleaming' or 'bright') was a daughter of the Trojan river god Scamander.

== Mythology ==
When Heracles went to war against Troy, Deimachus, a Boeotian, one of the companions of Heracles, fell in love with Glaucia. But Deimachus was slain in battle before Glaucia had given birth to the child she had by him. She fled for refuge to Heracles, who took her with him to Greece, and entrusted her to the care of Eleon, the father of Deimachus. She there gave birth to a son, whom she called Scamander, and who afterwards obtained a tract of land in Boeotia, traversed by two streams, one of which (formerly Inachus) he called Scamander and the other Glaucia. He was married to Acidusa, from whom the Boeotian well Acidusa derived its name, and had three daughters, who were worshipped under the name of "the three maidens."
