= Aristonautae =

Ancient Greek harbour town

Coordinates: 38°04′37″N 22°38′09″E

Aristonautae or Aristonautai (Ancient Greek: Ἀριστοναῦται) was a town of ancient Achaea, serving as the harbour of Pellene, at a distance of 60 stadia from it, and 120 from Aegeira. It is said to have been so called from the Argonauts having landed there in the course of their voyage.

Its site is located near the modern Xylokastro.

Map of ancient Achaea (with place names in Greek)
