= Autolycus (son of Deimachus) =

Ancient Greek mythological figure

In Greek mythology, Autolycus (/ɔːˈtɒlɪkəs/; Ancient Greek: Αὐτόλυκος Autolykos, "the wolf itself") was a Triccan prince as son of King Deimachus of Thessaly and brother of Demoleon (Deileon), Phlogius and sometimes, Phronius.

Autolycus, together with his brothers, joined Heracles in his expedition against the Amazons. But after having gone astray, the three brothers dwelt at Sinope, until they joined the expedition of the Argonauts. Autolycus was subsequently regarded as the founder of Sinope, where he was worshipped as a god and had an oracle. After the conquest of Sinope by the Romans, his statue was carried from there by Lucullus to Rome.

Hyginus confounded the brothers Autolycus, Phronius, Demoleon and Phlogius with the sons of Phrixus and Chalciope: Argus, Melas, Phrontides, and Cylindrus. These were also rescued by the Argonauts on the island of Dia.
