= Oebotas of Dyme =

Oebotas of Dyme (Ancient Greek: Οἰβώτας), the son of Oenias, was an ancient Greek athlete from Dyme who won the stadion race in the sixth Ancient Olympic Games in 756 BC. The stadion race (about 180 meters) was the only competition in the first 13 Olympiads.

He was the first winner from Achaea. A statue in his honor was erected in Olympia. It was customary for Achaeans who were going to compete in the Olympics to make a sacrifice to him. If they were victorious, they would lay a wreath at the base of his statue. In addition, Oebotas's tomb could be seen in the vicinity of Dyme.

== Curse ==
He was not honored for his victory by the Achaeans and legendarily cursed the Achaeans to never win the Olympics for that and the Achaeans did not have an Olympic winner until Sostratus of Pellene won the race.

== See also ==
- Olympic winners of the Stadion race
