= Syme (mythology) =

In Greek mythology, Syme (Ancient Greek: Σύμη) was the eponym of the island Syme.

== Mythology ==
According to Athenaeus, Syme was the daughter of Ialysos and Dotis. She was carried off by the sea god Glaucus on his way back from Asia. Glaucus named a deserted island he landed on after Syme.

Diodorus Siculus, however, writes of Syme as the mother of Chthonius with Poseidon, and mentions that it was Chthonius who named the island after Syme.
