= Noemon (mythology) =

In Greek mythology, Noëmon (Ancient Greek: Νοήμων means 'thoughtful, intelligent') may refer to the following characters:

- Noemon, a Lycian soldier who followed their leader, Sarpedon, to fight in the Trojan War. He was slain by the Greek hero Odysseus during the siege of Troy.
- Noemon, one of Antilochus' men.
- Noemon, a prominent Ithacan who provided the vessel in which Telemachus sailed in search for his father. His father was Phronius.
- Noemon, one of the companions of Aeneas. He was killed by Turnus, the man who opposed Aeneas in Italy.
- Noemon, a Carthaginian mentor of Achilles.
