= Pellen =

Greek mythological figure; founder of the city of Pellene

In Greek mythology, Pellen or Pelles (Ancient Greek: Πέλλης / Πελλῆς, lit. 'dark-coloured, dusky') was the founder of Pellene in Achaea. He was the son of Phorbas, son of Triopas of Thessaly, and the father of Hyperasius, father of the Argonauts, Amphion and Asterius.
