= Archenor =

Ancient Greek mythological figure

Archenor or Acheinor (Ancient Greek: Ἀρχεήνωρ) was in Greek mythology one of the Niobids, and perhaps the same who is called by Ovid "Alphenor".

The names of the Niobids, however, differ very much in the different lists.

In commercial telegraph code, the word "Archenor" was used to signify "You must number your invoices".
