= Menestratus =

Name in Greek mythology

In Greek mythology, Menestratus (Ancient Greek: Μενέστρατος, romanized: Menéstratos) is the name of the following figures:

- Menestratus, one of the male Niobids (the children of Niobe and Amphion) killed by Apollo.
- Menestratus, a man from Thespiae who sacrificed himself in order to slay a dragon and save the town.
