= Achaeus (son of Poseidon) =

In Greek mythology, the eponym of Achaea

In Greek mythology, Achaeus or Achaios (/əˈkiːəs/; Ancient Greek: Ἀχαιός, romanized: Akhaiós, lit. 'griever'', derived from αχος achos, 'grief, pain, woe') was the eponym of Achaea.

== Family ==
Achaeus was the son of Poseidon, the god of the sea and Larissa, daughter of Pelasgus, the son of Triopas, meaning he is of Argive descent through his mother's parentage. He is the brother of Phthius and Pelasgus.

== Mythology ==
Together with his brothers Phthius and Pelasgus, they left Achaean Argos with a Pelasgian contingent for Thessaly. They then established a colony on the said country naming it after themselves. The only source of the accounts of Achaeus is recounted by Dionysius of Halicarnassus in his Roman Antiquities about the Pelasgian race's migration in connection with Achaeus.

"In the sixth generation afterwards, leaving the Peloponnesus, they [Pelasgians] removed to the country which was then called Haemonia and now Thessaly. The leaders of the colony were Achaeus, Phthius and Pelasgus, the sons of Larisa and Poseidon. When they arrived in Haemonia they drove out the barbarian inhabitants and divided the country into three parts, calling them, after the names of their leaders, Phthiotis, Achaia and Pelasgiotis."
