= Promachus of Pellene =

Promachus (Greek: Πρόμαχος - Promachos) was a pankration athlete of the Ancient Olympic Games in Olympia, Greece. Son of Dryon, he was from Pellene in Achaea. He was a winner of the 94th Olympiad in 404 BC. He also won three times at the Isthmian and the Nemean Games. There was also a statue of him in ancient Olympia.
