= Achaeus (mythology) =

Name of three mythological characters

In Greek mythology, Achaeus or Achaios (/əˈkiːəs/; Ancient Greek: Ἀχαιός, romanized: Akhaiós, lit. 'griever'', derived from αχος achos, 'grief, pain, woe') was the name of three mythological characters:

- Achaeus, son of Poseidon and the eponym of Achaea.
- Achaeus, son of Xuthus and mythical founder of Achaean race.
- Achaeus, son of Phthia, daughter of Phoroneus and the god Zeus.
