= Hyperasius =

In Greek mythology the son of Pellen, eponymous founder of the said city

In Greek mythology, Hyperasius (Ancient Greek: Ὑπεράσιος), from Pellene in Achaea, was the son of Pellen, eponymous founder of the said city. He was the father of twin Argonauts Amphion and Asterius possibly by Hypso. Otherwise, the father of these men was called Hippasus.
