= Phlogius (mythology) =

In Greek mythology, Phlogius (Ancient Greek: Φλογίῳ or Φλογίον) may refer to the following personages:

- Phlogius, one of the Dolionians, people of northwestern Asia Minor visited by the Argonauts, killed by the Dioscuri.
- Phlogius, a Triccan prince as son of King Deimachus of Thessaly, and brothers to Autolycus, Demoleon (Deileon), and sometimes Phronius. These men joined Heracles in his expedition against the Amazons but they never returned and settled in Sinope. Later on, they joined the Argonauts.
- Phlogius, son of Eulaeus, who an Indian chieftain who armed himself against Dionysus during the Indian war.
- Phlogius, son of Strophius, who followed Dionysus in his Indian campaign and was killed by Morrheus.
