= Larissa (mythology) =

Greek mythological figure

In Greek mythology, Larissa (Ancient Greek: Λάρισσα, lit. 'citadel' or 'fortress') or Larisa (/ləˈrɪsə/; Ancient Greek: Λάρισα, Lárisa, pronounced [ˈlarisa] was the name of two different figures that appears in various accounts:

== Larisa, daughter of Pelasgus ==
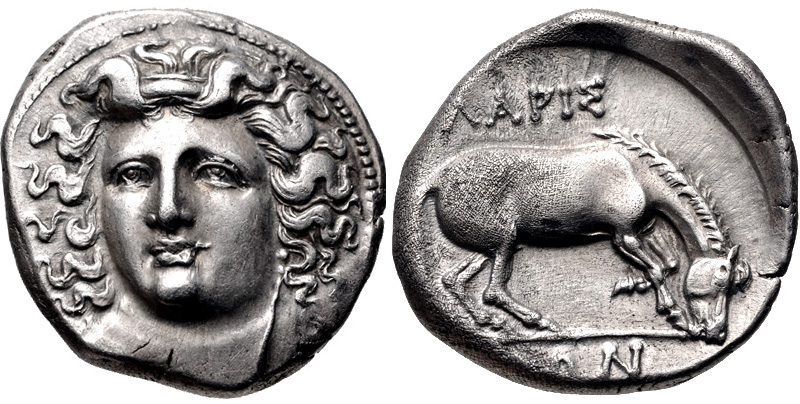
Larissa (left) and a horse (right) on a silver drachma from Larissa, Thessaly, c. 356–342 BC

Larisa was a nymph from Thessaly. She was described by Pausanias as a daughter of Pelasgus, son of Triopas, king of Argos. Hellanicus states that the sons of Poseidon and Larissa were Achaios, Phthios, and Pelasgus. These sons left Argos and arrived in Haemonia (Thessaly) where they drove out the barbarian inhabitants and divided the country into three parts, calling them, after their names, Phthiotis, Achaia and Pelasgiotis.

The arx (citadel) of Argos and two towns (Larissa in Thessaly and one in the Peneus) are believed to have derived their name (meaning "citadel") from her.

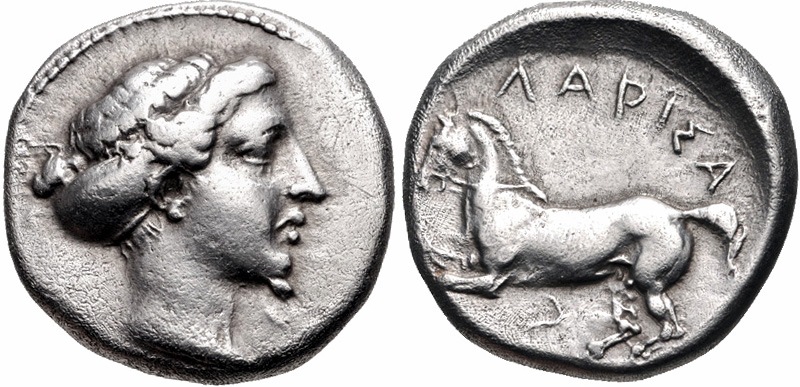
Silver drachma from Larissa, 410–405 BC, depicting the nymph Larissa. Reverse: Bridled horse galloping, inscriptions IA, ΛΑΡΙΣΑ.

She was represented on the obverse of common drachmas produced by the city of Larissa between 400 BCE and at least 340 BCE, as a three-quarters face with outward flowing hair. This style was copied from the head of Arethusa by Cimon, depicted on Syracusan tetradrachmas. According to hoard evidence from Thessaly, this coinage was produced down to c. 320 BCE. Other coins depict Larissa seated, holding a hydria and with a spring nearby, confirming her status as a nymph.

A moon of Neptune was discovered by Harold J. Reitsema, William B. Hubbard, Larry A. Lebofsky and David J. Tholen on May 24, 1981, and later given the name Larissa. Larissa is also designated as "Neptune VII", S/1981 N 1 and "S/1989 N 2".

== Larisa, daughter of Piasus ==
Larissa was the daughter of the Pelasgian king, Piasus and wife of Cyzicus, king of the Dolionians, the people of northwestern Asia Minor visited by the Argonauts. Strabo reported that "before her marriage, her father Piasus fell in love with her and, having violated her, paid the penalty for the outrage; on that account Larisa, observing him leaning over a cask of wine, seized him by the legs, raised him, and plunged him into the cask, drowning him."

== Larissa, sister of Cyrene ==
According to a scholion of Apollonius of Rhodes' Argonautica, a Larissa was called the sister of Cyrene after whom the city in Thessaly is named.

== See also ==
- Elara (mythology)
