= Dotis (son of Asterius) =

Son of Asterius in Greek mythology

In Greek mythology, Dotis (Ancient Greek: Δωτίς or Δωτίδος, romanized: Dōtis) or Dotius (Ancient Greek: Δώτιος, romanized: Dōtios, lit. 'given' or 'gift') was the son of Asterius and Amphictyone, daughter of Phthius. According to Pherecydes (c. 450 BC), he was the eponym of the city Dotion (Dotium) in Thessaly.

Alternate mythical eponyms were Dotia, daughter of Elatus, and Dotus, son of either Pelasgus or Neonus, son of Hellen.
