= Sidero =

Wife of Salmoneus in Greek mythology

In Greek mythology, Sidero (Ancient Greek: Σιδηρώ means "the Iron One") was the second wife of King Salmoneus of Elis and stepmother of Tyro, whom she mistreated. Pelias and Neleus, Tyro's twin sons, sought revenge when they reached adulthood. Although Sidero fled from them into Hera's district, Pelias nevertheless murdered her atop the altar to Hera, earning the goddess' undying hatred in the process.

Sidero's family tree

Alcidice	Salmoneus
Tyro
Pelias	Neleus

Sidero
