= Sostratus of Pellene =

Sostratus (Ancient Greek: Σώστρατος, Sostratos) was an Ancient Greek athlete from Pellene, Achaea. He won the footrace for boys at the Ancient Olympic Games. He was the first Achaean to win at the Olympics since Oebotas of Dyme. According to legend, Oebotas had cursed the Achaeans for not giving him a special prize after his Olympic victory, so that no Achaean should win at the Olympics. When the Achaeans had dedicated a statue to Oebotas in Olympia, the curse was broken and Sostratus could win.
