= Deileon =

Figures in Greek mythology

Deileon (Ancient Greek: Δηιλέων Dēileōn) may refer to two figures in Greek mythology.

- Deileon, a Triccan prince as son of King Deimachus in Thessaly. Along with his brothers, Autolycus and Phlogius, Deileon took part in the campaign of Hercules during the Amazon battles. These three brothers went astray and stayed at Sinope, where they later met the Argonauts and joined them on their expedition to Colchis. Plutarch mentioned him as Demoleon.
- Deileon, a Greek henchman of Epeius of Phocis during the Trojan War. He was killed by the hero Aeneas.
