= Scamander of Boeotia =

Scamander (/skəˈmændər/; Ancient Greek: Σκάμανδρος, lit. 'Skamandros') was a king in Boeotia.

== Etymology ==
The meaning of the name is "left(-handed) man". The second element looks like it is derived from Greek ἀνδρός (andrós) meaning "of a man", but there are sources who doubt this. The first element is more difficult to pinpoint: it could be derived from Greek σκάζω (skazo) "to limp, to stumble (over an obstacle)" or from Greek σκαιός (skaios) meaning "left(-handed)" or "awkward". The meaning of the name might then perhaps be "limping man" or "awkward man".

== Mythology ==
Scamander named the Inachus river after himself; the stream nearby he called Glaucia from his mother, and the spring Acidusa he named after his wife. His father was Deimachus, son of Eleon. Scamander and Acidusa are the parents of the maidens, who were honoured in Boeotia.
