= Niobids =

Figures in Greek mythology

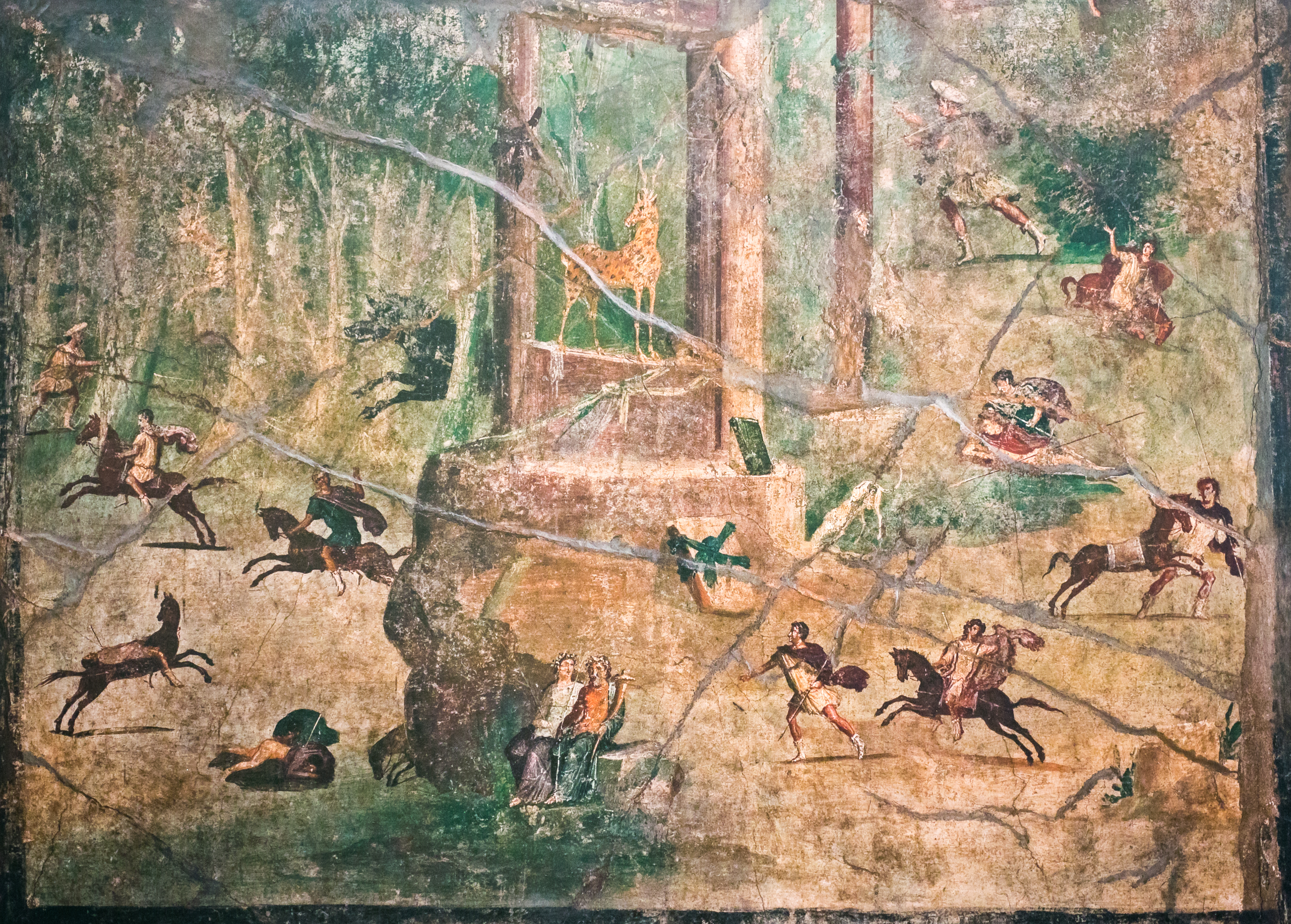
Roman fresco: Apollo and Artemis shoot the sons of Niobe, who flee (partly on horseback) in an idyllic landscape, 1st c. BC - 1st c. AD

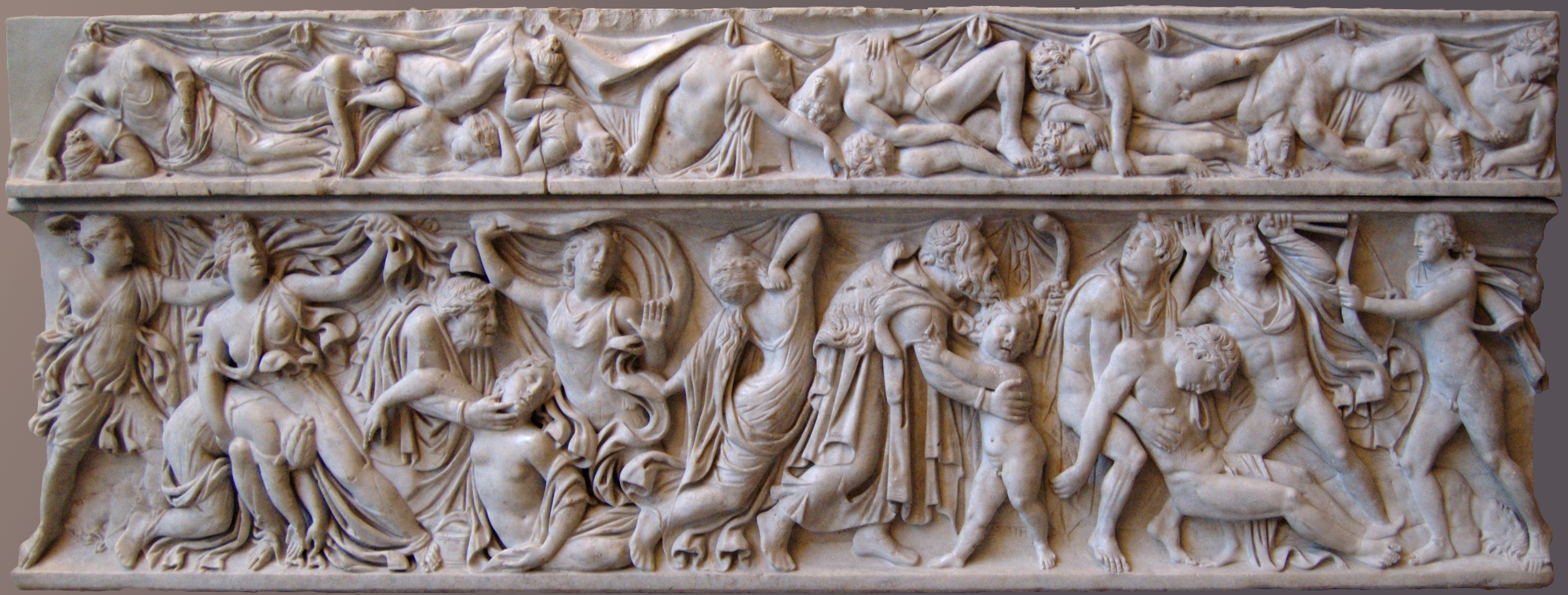
Roman sarcophagus: Apollo and Artemis killing the 14 children of Niobe (front side). Artemis; 5 daughters with a nurse; younger son with a pedagogue; 3 other sons; Apollo. Top: dead Niobids. 160–170 Ad

In Greek mythology, the Niobids were the children of Amphion of Thebes and Niobe, slain by Apollo and Artemis because Niobe, born of the royal house of Phrygia, had boastfully compared the greater number of her own offspring with those of Leto, Apollo's and Artemis' mother: a classic example of hubris.

== Names ==
The number of Niobids mentioned most usually numbered twelve (Homer) or fourteen (Euripides and Apollodorus), but other sources mention twenty, four (Herodotus), or eighteen (Sappho). Generally half these children were sons, the other half daughters. The names of some of the children are mentioned; these lists vary by author:

List of Niobids
| Names | | Sources | | | | | | |
|---|---|---|---|---|---|---|---|---|
| Names | | Ovid | Apollodorus | Hyginus | | Lactantius | Scholia on Euripides | |
| Names | | Ovid | Apollodorus | Hyginus | | Lactantius | Pherecydes | Hellanicus |
| Males | Damasichthon | ✓ | ✓ | ✓ | | | | |
| Males | Ismenus | ✓ | ✓ | ✓ | | | | |
| Males | Phaedimus | ✓ | ✓ | ✓ | | ✓ | | |
| Males | Sipylus | ✓ | ✓ | ✓ | | ✓ | | |
| Males | Tantalus | ✓ | ✓ | ✓ | | ✓ | | |
| Males | Alphenor | ✓ | | | | | | |
| Males | Ilioneus | ✓ | | | | | | |
| Males | Agenor | | ✓ | | | | | |
| Males | Eupinytus | | ✓ | ✓ | | ✓ | | |
| Males | Archenor | | | ✓ | | | | ✓ |
| Males | Antagorus | | | | | ✓ | | |
| Males | Archemorus | | | | | ✓ | | |
| Males | Xenarchus | | | | | ✓ | | |
| Males | Alalcomeneus | | | | | | ✓ | |
| Males | Eudorus | | | | | | ✓ | |
| Males | Argeius | | | | | | ✓ | |
| Males | Lysippus | | | | | | ✓ | |
| Males | Phereus | | | | | | ✓ | |
| Males | Xanthus | | | | | | ✓ | |
| Males | Archagoras | | | | | | | ✓ |
| Males | Menestratus | | | | | | | ✓ |
| Number | | 7 | 7 | 7 | | 7 | 6 | 3 |
| Females | Astycrateia | not given | ✓ | ✓ | ✓ | ✓ | | ✓ |
| Females | Ogygia | not given | ✓ | ✓ | ✓ | | | ✓ |
| Females | Phthia | not given | ✓ | ✓ | | | | |
| Females | Neaera or | not given | ✓ | ✓ | | ✓ | | |
| Females | Cleodoxa | not given | ✓ | | ✓ | ✓ | | |
| Females | Pelopia | not given | ✓ | | | ✓ | ✓ | ✓ |
| Females | Astyoche | not given | ✓ | | | | | |
| Females | Ethodaia | not given | ✓ | | | | | |
| Females | Chloris | not given | | ✓ | ✓ | ✓ | | |
| Females | Eudoxa | not given | | ✓ | | | | |
| Females | Astynome | not given | | | ✓ | | | |
| Females | Chias | not given | | | ✓ | | | |
| Females | Thera | not given | | | ✓ | | | |
| Females | Ogime | not given | | | | ✓ | | |
| Females | Phegea | not given | | | | ✓ | | |
| Females | Chione | not given | | | | | ✓ | |
| Females | Clytia | not given | | | | | ✓ | |
| Females | Hore | not given | | | | | ✓ | |
| Females | Lamippe | not given | | | | | ✓ | |
| Females | Melia | not given | | | | | ✓ | |
| Number | | 0 | 7 | 6 | 7 | 7 | 6 | 3 |

Other different names were also mentioned, including Amaleus, Amyclas, Meliboea and Neis (also in Apollodorus, see below).

Manto, the seeress daughter of Tiresias, overheard Niobe's remark and bid the Theban women placate Leto, in vain. Apollo and Artemis slew all the children of Niobe with their arrows, Apollo shooting the sons, Artemis the daughters. According to some sources, however, two of the Niobids who had supplicated Leto were spared: Apollodorus gives their names as Meliboea (Chloris) and Amyclas. Another apparent survivor is Phylomache, who is mentioned by Apollodorus as one of the two possible spouses of Pelias.

The Niobids were buried by the gods at Thebes. Ovid remarked that all men mourned Amphion, for the extinction of his line, but none mourned Niobe save her brother Pelops.

== Parthenius variant ==
In another version of the myth, the Niobids are the children of Philottus and Niobe, daughter of Assaon. When Niobe dares to argue with Leto about the beauty of her children, Leto comes up with multi-stage punishment. First, Philottus is killed while hunting. Then, her father Assaon makes advances to his own daughter, which she refuses. He invites her children to a banquet and burns them all to death. As a result of these calamities, Niobe flings herself from a rock. Assaon, reflecting over his crimes, also killed himself.

== Art ==
Due to their appearance in the mythology of Apollo, male and female Niobids frequently appeared in classical art. One of the two ivory reliefs added to the doors of the Temple of Apollo Palatinus in its Augustan rebuild depicted their death. They are also known from figurative sculpture, examples of which are to be found at the Palazzo Massimo in Rome and in the group of Niobids (including Niobe sheltering one of her daughters) found in Rome in 1583 along with the Wrestlers and brought to the Uffizi in Florence in 1775.

A terracotta figurine of Astycrateia is shown in the MAK Collection Online. A 3D-model of the same figurine was published on sketchfab.

== Gallery ==
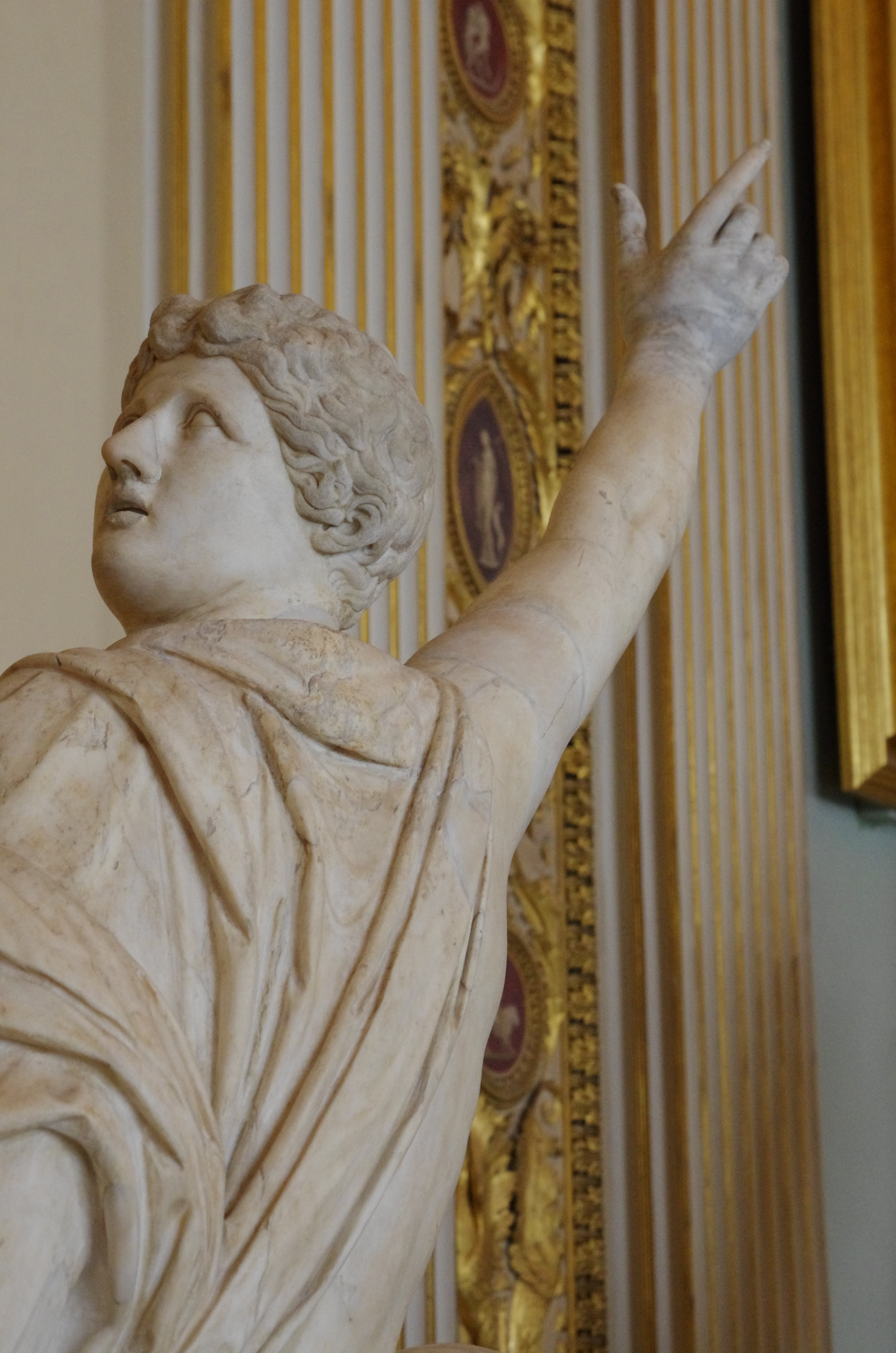
Niobid rises on a rock Galleria degli Uffizi

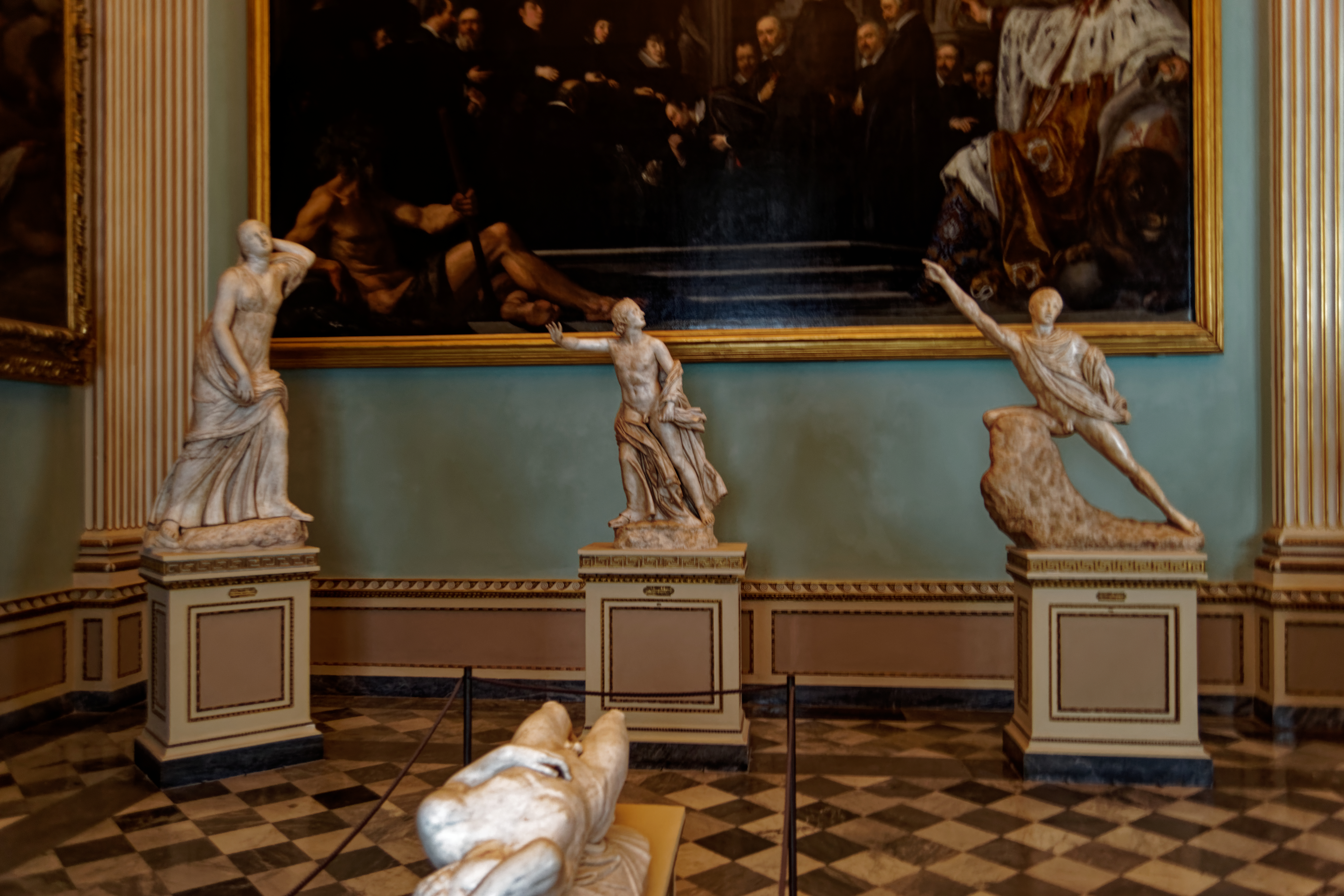
The Niobe Room (Italian: Sala della Niobe) at the Uffizi

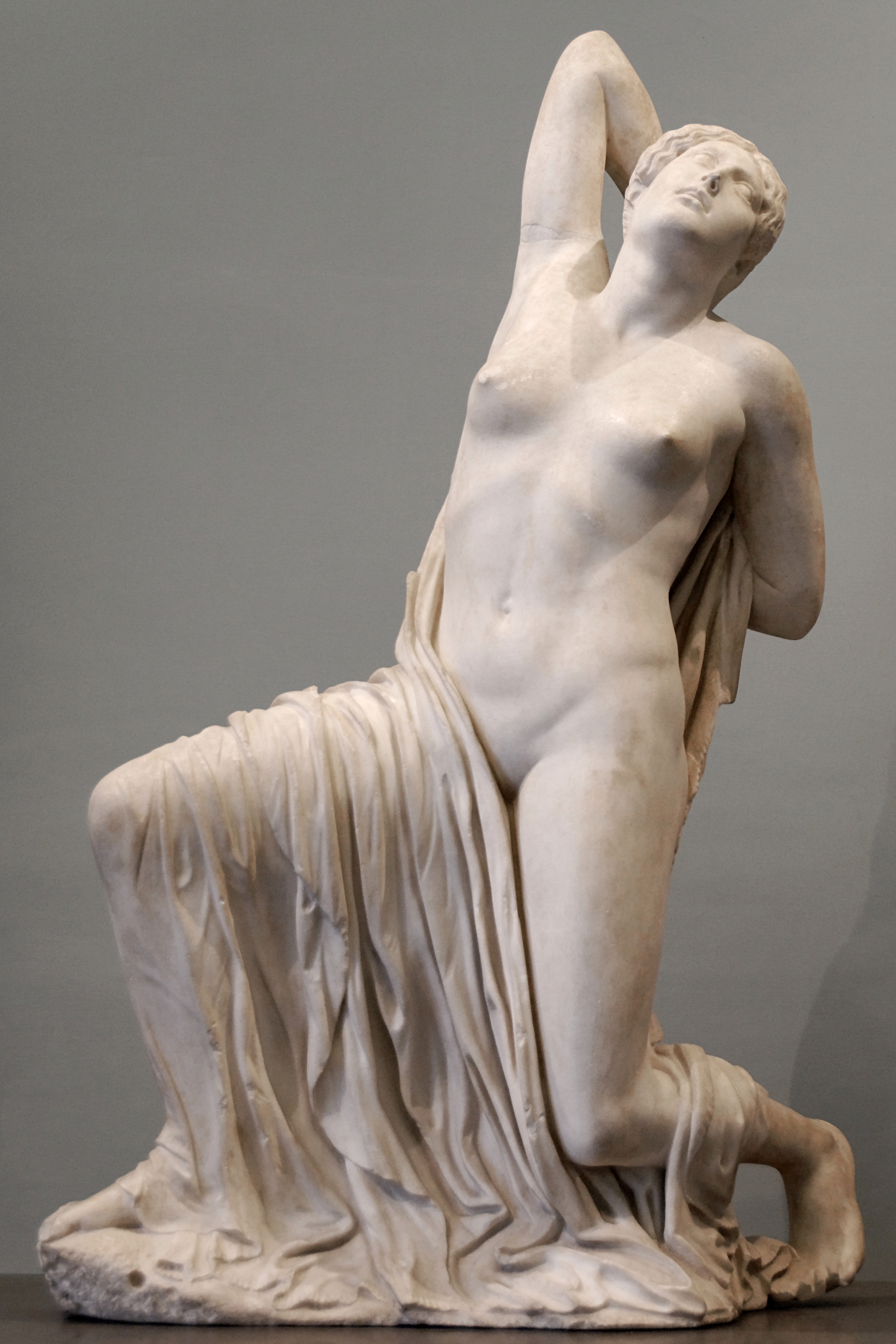
Dying Niobid, found in the Gardens of Sallust (Palazzo Massimo).

Niobe and her children, (Uffizi).

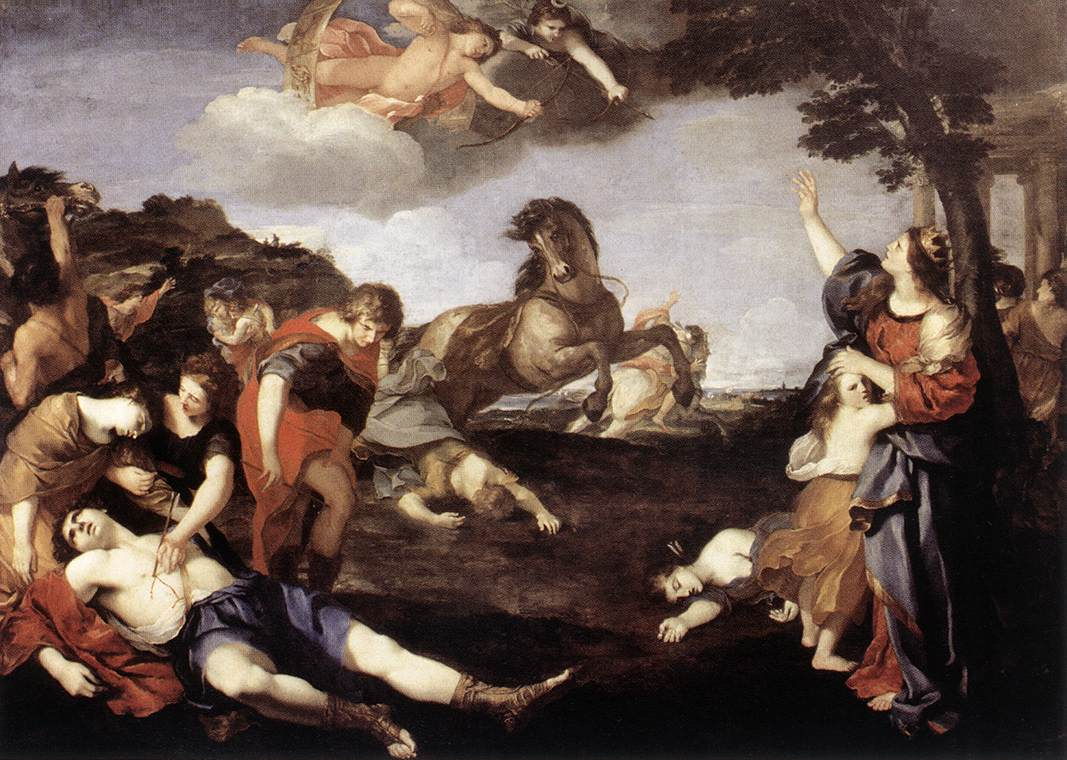
The Massacre of the Niobids by Andrea Camassei, Galleria Nazionale d'Arte Antica
