= Enipeus (deity) =

Ancient Greek river god

Enipeus, in ancient Greece, was a river god. Enipeus was loved by a mortal woman named Tyro, who was married to a mortal man named Cretheus. Poseidon, filled with lust for Tyro, disguised himself as Enipeus and from their union was born Pelias and Neleus, twin boys. The River Enipeus (now Enipeas) is located in Thessaly, and was the site of the Battle of Cynoscephalae and the Battle of Pharsalus.

== See also ==
- List of water deities
