= Tyro =

Thessalian princess in Greek mythology

Terracotta figurine of Tyro exposing her infant twins, c. 300–250 BC, National Archaeological Museum of Greece.

In Greek mythology, Tyro (/ˈtaɪroʊ/; Ancient Greek: Τυρώ, romanized: Tyrō) was an Elean princess who later became Queen of Iolcus.

== Family ==
Tyro was the daughter of King Salmoneus of Elis and Alcidice, daughter of King Aleus of Arcadia. She married her uncle King Cretheus of Iolcus and had three sons (Aeson, Pheres and Amythaon) by him, and also bore twin sons, Pelias and Neleus, with Poseidon. Aeson was the father of Jason, a central figure in the Argonauts' quest for the Golden Fleece. Tyro later married her paternal uncle, Sisyphus, and had two more children. Fearing a prophecy that her children would kill her father, Tyro killed them. In some accounts, Tyro had a daughter named Phalanna who gave her name to city of Phalanna in Thessaly.

Tyro's family tree

Alcidice	Salmoneus
Cretheus	Tyro	Poseidon
Aeson	Pheres	Amythaon	Pelias	Neleus

== Mythology ==
Tyro's father Salmoneus was the brother of Athamas and Sisyphus. She was married to her uncle Cretheus, King of Iolcus but Tyro loved the river god Enipeus who refused her advances. One day, Poseidon filled with lust for Tyro, disguised himself as Enipeus and from their union were born Pelias and Neleus, twin boys. Tyro exposed her sons on a mountain to die, but they were found by a herdsman who raised them as his own. When the twins reached adulthood, they found Tyro and killed her stepmother, Sidero, for having mistreated their mother (Salmoneus married Sidero when Alcidice died). Sidero hid at the temple of Hera but Pelias killed her anyway, causing Hera's undying hatred of Pelias – and her glorious patronage of Jason and the Argonauts in their long quest for the Golden Fleece. Pelias' half brother Aeson, the son of Tyro and Cretheus, was the father of Jason. Soon after, Tyro married Sisyphus, her paternal uncle and had two children. It was said that their children would kill Salmoneus, so Tyro killed them in order to save her father.

== In popular culture ==
Ezra Pound refers to Tyro in The Cantos. In Canto 2 he takes up her rape by Poseidon:

"And by the beach-run, Tyro,
Twisted arms of the sea-god,
Lithe sinews of water, gripping her, cross-hold,
And the blue-gray glass of the wave tents them,
Glare azure of water, cold-welter, close cover."

In a later Canto (74) Pound connects her to Alcmene, imprisoned in the world of the dead, but in a later paradisal vision he sees her "ascending":

thick smoke, purple, rising
bright flame now on the altar
the crystal funnel of air
out of Erebus, the delivered,
Tyro, Alcmene, free now, ascending
[...] no shades more (Canto 90)
