= Asterius (mythology) =

Set of mythological Greek characters

In Greek mythology, Asterion (Ancient Greek: Ἀστερίων, gen.: Ἀστερίωνος, lit. 'starry'; pronounced /əˈstɪəriən/ or /as-ˌtir-ē-ˈän/, uh-STEER-ee-uhn, uh-steer-ee-un or as-TEER-ee-ahn), also called Asterius (Ancient Greek: Ἀστέριος, romanized: Astérios, lit. 'star-like'; pronounced /əˈstɪəriəs/, ah-STEER-ee-us or ah-STEER-ee-os) may refer to the following figures:

- Asterion, one of the river gods.
- Asterius, one of the Giants.
- Asterion, an attendant of the starry-god Astraeus.
- Asterius, husband of Amphictyone, daughter of Phthius, and father of Dotius (Dotis), one of the possible eponyms of Dotion (Dotium) in Thessaly. According to Fowler, he was perhaps a son of a nymph and a river-god, otherwise unknown.
- Asterion or Asterius, king of Crete and foster-father of Minos.
- Asterion or Asterius, name of the Minotaur.
- Asterion, son of Zeus and Idaea, a daughter of Minos.
- Asterius, son of Minos and Androgenia, a girl from the Cretan city of Phaistos. He was the commander of Cretans who joined the god Dionysus in his Indian War. Asterius never returned to his homeland but instead settled among the Colchians and named them Asterians. There Asterius fathered Miletus, Caunus, and Byblis.
- Asterius, a king of Anactoria (Miletus) and son of Anax, son of Gaia. He was a slain by the hero Miletus who named after himself the newly conquered lands. According to Pausanias, an island named after him was thought to be a burial of him that existed near the city of Milesians.
- Asterius, according to Hyginus one of the Sons of Aegyptus, who married Cleo, daughter of Danaus.
- Asterius, a prince of Pylos and son of King Neleus by Chloris, daughter of King Amphion of Orchomenus. He was the brother to Pero, Asterius, Pylaon, Deimachus, Eurybius, Epilaus, Evagoras, Phrasius, Eurymenes, Alastor, Nestor and Periclymenus. Asterius was slain along with his brothers, except Nestor, by Heracles when the hero took revenge on Neleus when the latter refused to cleanse Heracles of his blood-debt.
- Asterion or Asterius, an Argonaut from Peirasia in Thessaly. He was the son of Cometes and Antigona, daughter of King Pheres of Pherae.
- Asterius or Asterion, an Argonaut from the Achaean city of Pellene. He was the son of Hyperasius, son of Pelles, son of Phorbas. In two separate accounts, Asterius and his brother Amphion were called the children of Hypso while Hippasus was said to be their father.
