= Phthius =

In Greek mythology, Phthius (Ancient Greek: Φθῖος, romanized: Phthîos) was the name of two different figures:

- Phthius, son of Lycaon.
- Phthius, son of Poseidon & Larissa.
