= Neleus =

King of Pylos in Greek mythology

Neleus (/ˈniːliəs, ˈniːljuːs/; Ancient Greek: Νηλεύς) was a mythological king of Pylos. In some accounts, he was also counted as an Argonaut instead of his son, Nestor.

== Family ==
Neleus was the son of Poseidon and Tyro, and brother of Pelias. According to Pausanias, Neleus was the son of Cretheus, King of Iolcus, who was himself a son of Aeolus.

With Chloris, Neleus was the father of Pero, Periclymenus, Alastor, Chromius, Asterius, Deimachus, Epilaus, Eurybius, Eurymenes, Evagoras, Phrasius, Pylaon, Taurus and Nestor. Some say that Chloris was mother only of three of Neleus' sons (Nestor, Periclymenus and Chromius), whereas the rest were his children by different women, but other accounts explicitly disagree with the statement. Otherwise, the mother of Nestor was called Polymede.

Tyro was married to Cretheus (with whom she had three sons, Aeson, Pheres, and Amythaon), though she loved Enipeus, a river god. She pursued Enipeus, who refused her advances. One day, Poseidon, filled with lust for Tyro, disguised himself as Enipeus. From their union were born twin boys, Pelias and Neleus. Tyro exposed her sons on a mountain, but they were found and raised by a maid.

== Mythology ==
When they reached adulthood, Pelias and Neleus found their mother Tyro and then killed her stepmother, Sidero, for having mistreated her. Sidero tried to hide in a temple to Hera but Pelias killed her anyway, earning himself Hera's undying hatred. Neleus and Pelias then fought for the crown, and Neleus was banished to Messenia. There he was welcomed by his cousin Aphareus who gave him the maritime part of the land where he settled and established his palace. Neleus eventually became King of Pylos.

Heracles later asked Neleus to cleanse him of the blood-debt he gained by killing his own wife and children, but was refused. In retaliation, he killed Neleus and his sons, except for Nestor.
