= Chloris =

Set of mythological Greek characters

In Greek mythology, the name Chloris (/ˈklɔːrɪs/; Greek Χλῶρις Chlōris, from χλωρός chlōrós, meaning "greenish-yellow", "pale green", "pale", "pallid", or "fresh") appears in a variety of contexts. Some clearly refer to different characters; other stories may refer to the same Chloris, but disagree on details.

- Chloris, a nymph loved by Zephyrus (West Wind).
- Chloris, wife of Neleus, king of Pylos. It is, however, not always clear whether she or the below Chloris is mentioned in this role.
- Chloris, one of the Niobids.
- Chloris, daughter of Orchomenus, married the seer Ampyx (son of Elatus or Titairon), with whom she had a child Mopsus who also became a renowned seer and would later join the Argonauts. The Argonautica Orphica calls her by a different name, Aregonis. In some accounts, she mothered Mopsus by Zeus.
