= Amphictyone =

In Greek mythology, Amphictyone (Ancient Greek: Ἀμφικτυόνης, romanized: Amphiktyone, lit. 'she who dwells around' or 'female neighbor') was the daughter of Phthius, eponym of Phthiotis. She married Asterius and became the mother of Dotius (Dotis), one of the possible eponyms of Dotium (Dotion) in Thessaly.

Her name was the feminine form of Amphictyon, the legendary king of Athens who founded the Amphictyonic League.
