= Pellene =

Ancient Greek city-state of ancient Achaea

Coordinates: 38°02′41″N 22°32′18″E

Pellene (/pəˈliːniː/; Ancient Greek: Πελλήνη; Doric Greek: Πελλάνα / Πελλίνα) was a city and polis (city-state) of ancient Achaea, the most easterly of the twelve Achaean cities (the Achaean League). Its territory bordered upon that of Sicyon on the east and upon that of Aegeira on the west. Pellene was situated 60 stadia from the sea, upon a strongly fortified hill, the summit of which rose into an inaccessible peak, dividing the city into two parts. Its port was at Aristonautae.

Map of ancient Achaea (with place names in Greek)

== Mythology and proto-history ==
Its name was derived by the inhabitants themselves from the giant Pallas, and by the Argives from the Argive Pellen, a son of Phorbas. Pellene was a city of great antiquity. It is mentioned in the Homeric Catalogue of Ships in the Iliad; and according to a tradition, preserved by Thucydides, the inhabitants of Scione in the peninsula of Pallene in Macedonia professed to be descended from the Achaean Pallenians, who were driven on the Macedonian coast, on their return from Troy.

== History ==
At the commencement of the Peloponnesian War, Pellene was the only one of the Achaean towns which espoused the Spartan cause, though the other states afterwards followed their example. It was a member of the first Achaean League until that League was dissolved by Alexander the Great. In the time of Alexander the Great, Pellene fell under the dominion of one of its citizens of the name of Chaeron, a distinguished athlete, who raised himself to the tyranny by Alexander's assistance. Around 270/265 BCE it was again a democracy joining the revived Achaean League. In the wars which followed the re-establishment of the Achaean League, Pellene was several times taken and re-taken by the contending parties. In 241 BCE, Pellene was briefly conquered by the Aetolian League, but the raiding party was expelled by Aratus of Sicyon in the Battle of Pellene. In 225 BCE, it was captured by Cleomenes III of Sparta, but after the successful intervention of Macedon it was returned to Achaea the following year. Pellene remained a member of the Achaean League until the Roman conquest in 146 BCE.

== Description ==
The buildings of Pellene are described by Pausanias. Of these, the most important were a temple of Athena, with a statue of the goddess, said to have been one of the earlier works of Pheidias; a temple of Dionysus Lampter, in whose honour a festival, Lampteria, was celebrated; a temple of Apollo Theoxenius, to whom a festival, Theoxenia, was celebrated; a gymnasium, and more. Sixty stadia from the city was the Mysaeum (Μύσαιον), a temple of the Mysian Demeter; and near it a temple of Asclepius, called Cyrus (Κῦρος): at both of these places there were copious springs.

Between Aegium and Pellene, ancient writers mention a village also called Pellene, celebrated for the manufacture of a particular kind of cloaks, which were given as prizes in the agonistic contests in the city. Others, however, questions this second Pellene, supposing that Strabo is describing Pellene as both citadel and village.

== Situation ==
The ruins are southwest of Xylokastro on the northern coast of the Peloponnese.

== Notable people ==
- Phanas of Pellene (6th century BC), runner (Olympic victor 512 BC)
- Sostratus of Pellene (5th century BC), runner (Olympic victor 460 BC)
- Promachus of Pellene (5th century BC), pakratiast (Olympic victor 404 BC)
- Chaeron of Pellene (4th century BC), wrestler and tyrant (Olympic victor between 356 and 344 BC)

== See also ==
- Pellana
