= Amphion =

Set of characters in Greek mythology

There are several characters named Amphion (/æmˈfaɪ.ɒn/; Ancient Greek: Ἀμφίων, romanized: Amphíōn) in Greek mythology:

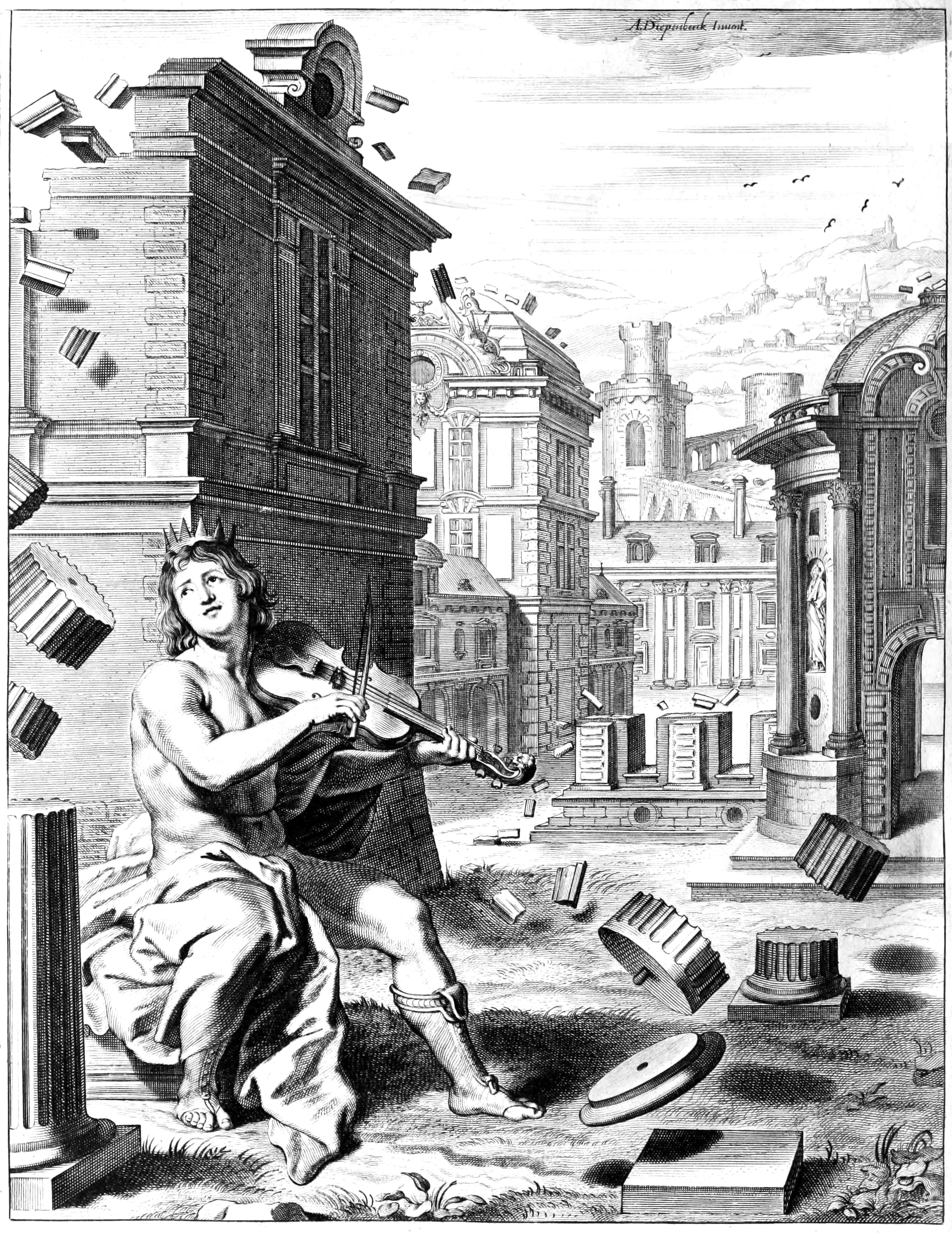
Amphion building Thebes with the power of music, from a 1655 engraving

- Amphion, son of Zeus and Antiope, and twin brother of Zethus. Together, they are famous for building Thebes. Pausanias recounts an Egyptian legend according to which Amphion employed magic to build the walls of the city. Amphion married Niobe, and killed himself after the loss of his wife and children (the Niobids) at the hands of Apollo and Artemis. Diodorus Siculus calls Chloris his daughter, but the other accounts of her parentage identify her father as another Amphion, the ruler of Minyan Orchomenus (see below).
- Amphion, king of the Minyan Orchomenus and son of Iasus. By Persephone, daughter of Minyas, he became the father of Chloris, wife of Neleus and Phylomache, wife of Pelias; these husbands are sons of Tyro and Poseidon.
- Amphion, son of Hyperasius, son of Pelles, son of Phorbas. From Achaean Pellene, he and his brother Asterius were counted among the Argonauts that sailed to Colchis. In two separate accounts, Hypso was called their mother while Hippasus was said to be their father.
- Amphion of Elis, an Achaean warrior who took part in the Trojan War on the side of the Greeks. He was a commander of the Epeans, together with Meges and Dracius.
- Amphion, friend of the celebrated architect Epeius. He was killed by Aeneas.
- Amphion, centaur who attended Pirithous's wedding, fought against the Lapiths, tried to plunder Pholus of his wine and was killed by Heracles.
