= Pero (princess) =

In Greek mythology, Pero (/ˈpɪroʊ, ˈpiːroʊ/; Ancient Greek: Πηρώ, romanized: Pērṓ) was a princess of Pylos.

== Family ==
Pero was the daughter of King Neleus and Chloris, daughter of the Minyan king Amphion of Orchomenus. She was the wife of her cousin Bias, and by him, bore her sons including Areius, Leodocus, and Talaus. In some accounts, her sons were called Aretus and Perialces. Pero had a daughter named Alphesiboea who married King Pelias of Iolcus.

== Mythology ==
The story of Pero is mentioned in Book XI of Homer's Odyssey. Pero's beauty attracted many suitors, but Neleus, her father, refused to give his daughter to any man unless he could raid the cattle of Iphicles from Phylace. In this version of the story, an unnamed seer volunteers to undertake the task. The cowherds capture him and keep him for a year, until he makes a prophecy.

Later in the Odyssey, the story is told by the seer Theoklymenos about his ancestor Melampous. Melampous was a wealthy man from Pylos, but he left Pylos fleeing Neleus who held his possessions by force for a year. During that year, Melampous was held prisoner in the house of Phylakos because of the daughter of Neleus, Pero, and an atë sent by the Erinyes. Melampous escaped death and drove the cattle back to Pylos. He took Pero home as a wife for his brother.

According to Pherecydes, Melampous overhears two woodworms saying that a beam in the ceiling of his prison is about to collapse. He asks the guards to carry him out, and as they step outside, the ceiling collapses, killing another female guard who treated Melampous badly. One of the surviving guards informs Phylakos and Phylakos tells Iphiklos. The two agree to give Melampous the sought after cattle if Melampous can cure Iphiklos' inability to beget children. Melampous makes the appropriate sacrifices to Zeus and asks the birds to whom he distributes portions of the sacrifice for help. The birds bring Melampous a vulture who tells him that Phylakos chased Iphiklos with a knife, presumably because Iphiklos had seen Phylakos do something mischievous. Phylakos, upon failing to catch Iphiklos, planted the knife in a wild pear tree and the bark grew over it. Melampous retrieved the knife and mixed the rust from the knife with wine. Iphiklos drank the wine for 10 days. Eventually a child, Podarkes, is born and the cattle are given to Melampous, who takes the cattle to Neleus as the bride price for Pero. He gives Pero to Bias to wed.

Apollodoros tells the same story but with some additions — Amythaon is married to his brother, Pheres' daughter, Eidomene. Melampous and Bias are their sons. Melampous gains the ability to understand the speech of animals after he saves the young of some snakes a servant killed, and the snake licks his ear. In Pero's story, the cattle belong to the father Phylakos and not Iphiklos. The incident that disallows Iphiklos from having children resulted from Iphiklos seeing Phylakos gelding rams, causing Phylakos to chase him with a knife.
