= Periclymenus =

Set of mythological Greek characters

In Greek mythology, the name Periclymenus (/ˌpɛrɪˈklɪmɪnəs/; Ancient Greek: Περικλύμενος, romanized: Periklýmenos or Periklymenos, lit. 'very famous' or 'much renowned') may refer to:

- Periclymenus, a Pylian prince as the son of King Neleus and Chloris. He was one of the Argonauts. His grandfather, Poseidon gave him the ability to shapeshift into various animals. He was killed by Herakles at Pylos, although he tried to escape in the form of an eagle. He was the father of Penthilos or by Pisidice, of Borus, the father of Penthilus.
- Periclymenus, a defender of Thebes in the war of the Seven against Thebes, and would-be killer of Amphiaraus. He was the son of Poseidon and Chloris, daughter of Tiresias of Thebes. Amphiaraus was swallowed by the earth before Periclymenus could kill him though. It was either this Periclymenus or Asphodicus that killed Parthenopaeus.
- Periclymenus, one of the Suitors of Penelope who came from Zacynthus along with other 43 wooers. He, with the other suitors, was killed by Odysseus with the aid of Eumaeus, Philoetius, and Telemachus.
- Periclymenus or simply Clymenus, father of Erginus who was usually conflated with another Erginus, one of the Argonauts.
