= Lelex (king of Sparta) =

King of Laconia

In Greek mythology, Lelex (/ˈliːlɪks/; Ancient Greek: Λέλεξ, gen. Λέλεγος) was one of the original inhabitants of Laconia which was called after him, its first king, Lelegia.

== Mythology ==
Lelex was said to be autochthonous or his father was the sun god Helios or the sea god Poseidon. He either consorted with the nymph Cleocharia and became the father of Eurotas or was the father of Polycaon and Myles (who himself was Eurotas's father). Some called his wife Peridia (Peridike) and their children were Myles, Polyclon (Polycaon), Bomolochus and Therapne.

In one tradition, again, Lelex was described as the son of Spartus, and father of Amyclas. The eponymous heroine Lakonia was credited to be a daughter of Lelex as well.

Through Myles, Lelex was the grandfather of Eurotas, who had a daughter named Sparta. This woman later married Lacedaemon who named the city of Sparta after his wife; however, the city's name would also be his own, as it was called either Lacedaemon or Sparta interchangeably.

Sources indicate that Perseus was a descendant of Lelex. The latter's great-granddaughter Sparta gave birth to a daughter named Eurydice who had married Acrisius, the king of Argos. Eurydice became the mother of Danaë, thus making her Perseus’ grandmother.

Lelex appears to have been conceived by ancient mythographers as the eponymous founder of the Leleges, a semi-mythical people who lived on both sides of the Aegean Sea. He had a heroön at Sparta.

Regnal titles
Preceded by None	King of Sparta	Succeeded by Myles
