= Cleocharia =

Queen of Laconia in Greek mythology

In Greek mythology, Cleocharia (/ˌkliːoʊˈkɛəriə/; Ancient Greek: Κλεοχαρεία, romanized: Kleokhareia, lit. 'famed for grace' or 'glory of grace') was a naiad (water nymph) of Laconia who became the queen-consort of King Lelex of Lelegia. She was the ancestor of the Spartan royal family and gave birth to Eurotas. The latter had a daughter named Sparta who married Lacedaemon. The city was called either Lacedaemon or Sparta interchangeably.

In one account, Cleochareia was called the mother of Eurotas and Pelias by Myles while another version of the text called her Teledice and their children were Eurotas and Kepedia.
