= Eurotas (mythology) =

King of Laconia in Greek mythology

- King of Laconia
- Member of the Sparta Royal Family
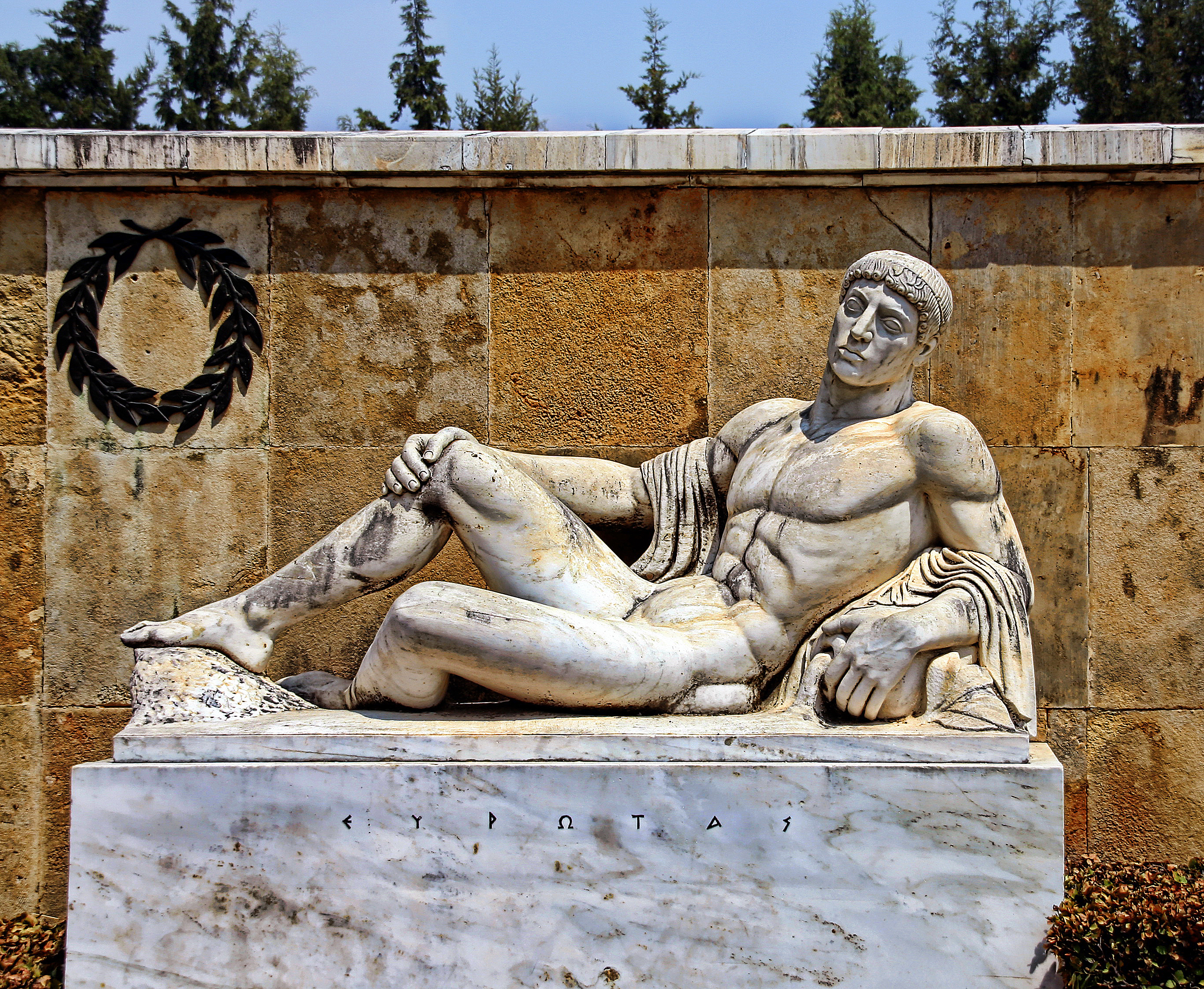
- Eurotas, from the modern monument of Leonidas I, Thermopylae
- Predecessor: Myles
- Successor: Lacedaemon
- Abode: Laconia

Genealogy
- Parents: (a) Myles (b) Lelex and Cleocharia (c) Myles and Teledice
- Siblings: unknown
- Consort: ?Clete
- Children: Sparta and Tiasa

In Greek mythology, Eurotas (/jʊəˈroʊtəs/; Ancient Greek: Εὐρώτας, romanized: Eurôtas) was a king of Laconia.

== Family ==
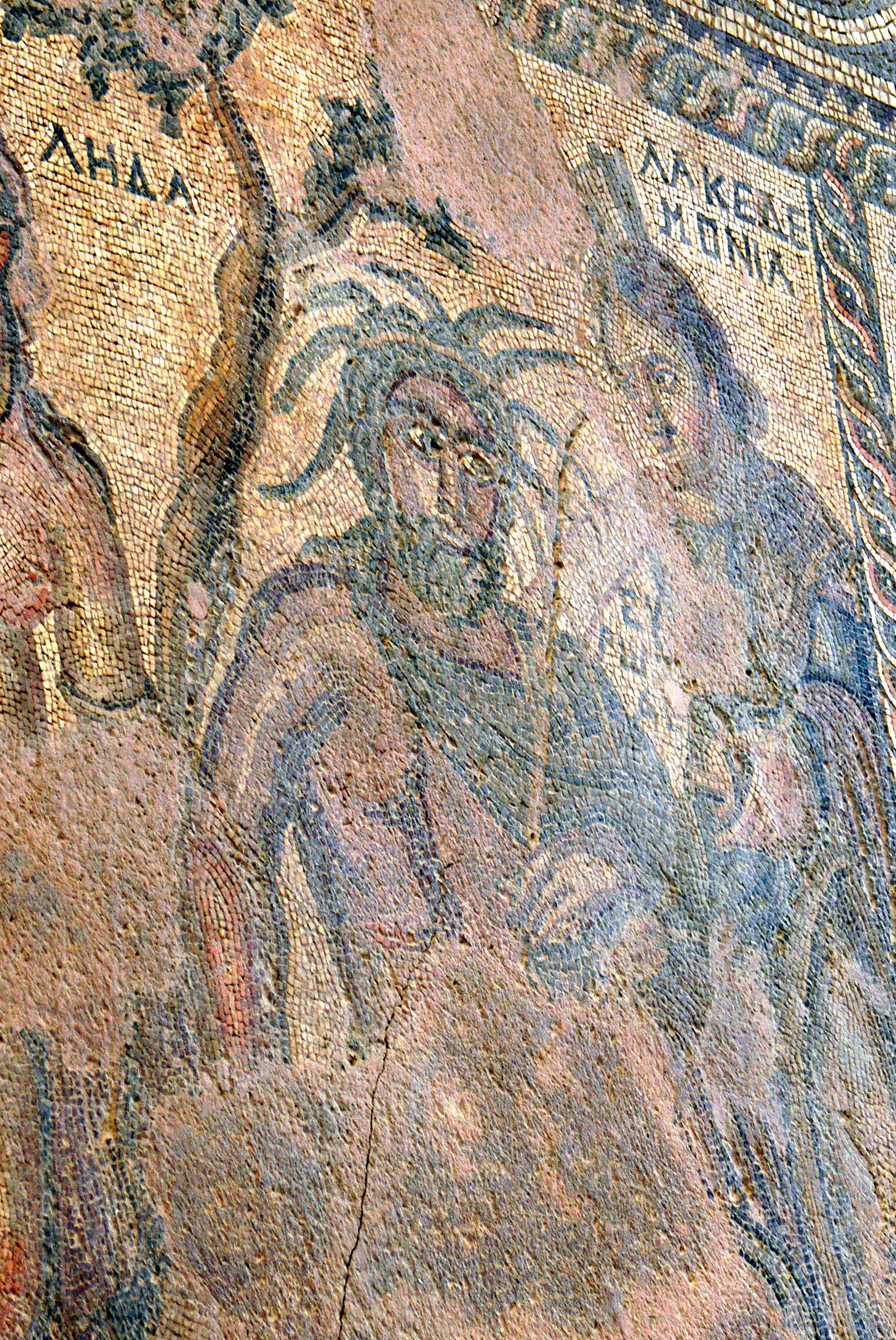
Eurotas with his daughter Sparta

Eurotas was the son of King Myles of Laconia and grandson of Lelex, eponymous ancestor of the Leleges. Meanwhile, another version of the myth recounts that his mother was called Cleochareia or Teledice and thus brother to Pelias or Kepedia.

The Bibliotheca gave a slight variant of the mythological generation of Eurotas, who was described as the son of Lelex, born from the ground, by his wife — the nymph Cleocharia. In another account, his mother was called Teledice instead.

Eurotas had no male heir but he had two daughters Sparta and Tiasa by Clete.

== Mythology ==
Eurotas bequeathed the kingdom to Lacedaemon, the son of Zeus and Taygete, after whom Mount Taygetus was named, according to Pausanias. This Lacedaemon married his daughter Sparta and renamed the state after his wife.

Pausanias says: "It was Eurotas who channelled away the marsh-water from the plains by cutting through to the sea, and when the land was drained he called the river which was left running there the Eurotas." The "cutting through" is seen by Pausanias’ translator and commentator, Peter Levy, S.J., as an explanation of Eurotas (or Vrodamas) Canyon, a ravine north of Skala where the river has cut through the foothills of Taygetus after changing direction to the west of the valley.

Regnal titles
Preceded by Myles	King of Sparta; Pre-Dorian	Succeeded by Lacedaemon

== Eurotas in art ==
River gods are typically represented in Greek art, such as coin motifs, as figures with the bodies of bulls and the faces of humans. If only the face appears, they might wear horns and have wavy hair or be accompanied by fish. Claudius Aelianus states that the Eurotas and other rivers are like bulls.
