= Myles =

King of Laconia in Greek mythology

In Greek mythology, Myles (/ˈmaɪliːz/; Ancient Greek: Μύλης, romanized: Múlēs, lit. 'mill-man') was an ancient king of Laconia.

== Family ==
Myles was the son of the King Lelex and brother of Polycaon. He was the father of Eurotas who begotten Sparta after whom the city of Sparta was named. In one account, her mother was called Peridia (Peridike) and thus brother of Polyclon (Polycaon), Bomolochus and Therapne.

Another version of the myth recounts her wife was called Teledice or Cleocharia and their children were Eurotas and Kepedia or Pelias.

== Mythology ==
After Lelex's death, Myles ruled over Laconia, and later on, following his own death, his son Eurotas succeeded him.

Myles was said to be the first mortal to invent a mill and ground corn in Alesiae.

Regnal titles
Preceded by Lelex	King of Sparta	Succeeded by Eurotas
