= Messene (mythology) =

In Greek mythology, Messene (/mɪˈsiːni/; Ancient Greek: Μεσσήνη, romanized: Messēnē) was the daughter of Triopas, king of Argos (or, alternately, daughter of Phorbas and sister of Triopas). She was married to Polycaon, son of king Lelex, of Laconia.

== Mythology ==
Messene was said to have been very ambitious. After her father-in-law died, her husband's brother Myles inherited the throne to Laconia. It was not her intent to be wed to an anonymous man, so she went about gathering an armed force from both Argos and Laconia. Once their army was ready, the newly married couple invaded a nearby territory. This territory was then named Messenia, after the aggressive princess of Argos. Following the establishment of the new kingdom, they founded the city Andania, where they built their palace. Glaucus, the son of Aepytus and grandson of Cresphontes, established a hero cult of Messene. There was a heroon of her in Messenia with a statue of gold and Parian marble. It is estimated that the story took place in 10th century B.C.

Pausanias remarks that he checked through The Great Ehoiai, Naupactica and the works of Cinaethon and Asius of Samos in search for information concerning children of Polycaon and Messene, but found no relevant information.
