= Tiasa =

Daughter of Eurotas in Greek mythology

In Greek mythology, Tiasa (Ancient Greek: Τίασα) was a nymph of a river near Amyclae, Sparta. She was a Laconian princess as the daughter of King Eurotas and Cleta, and thus sister of Sparta.

By the river Tiasa was situated a temple of Cleta and Phaenna, the two Charites recognized in Sparta, which was purported to have been founded by Lacedaemon.
