= Therapne =

Ancient Greek town near Sparta

Coordinates: 37°03′58″N 22°27′15″E

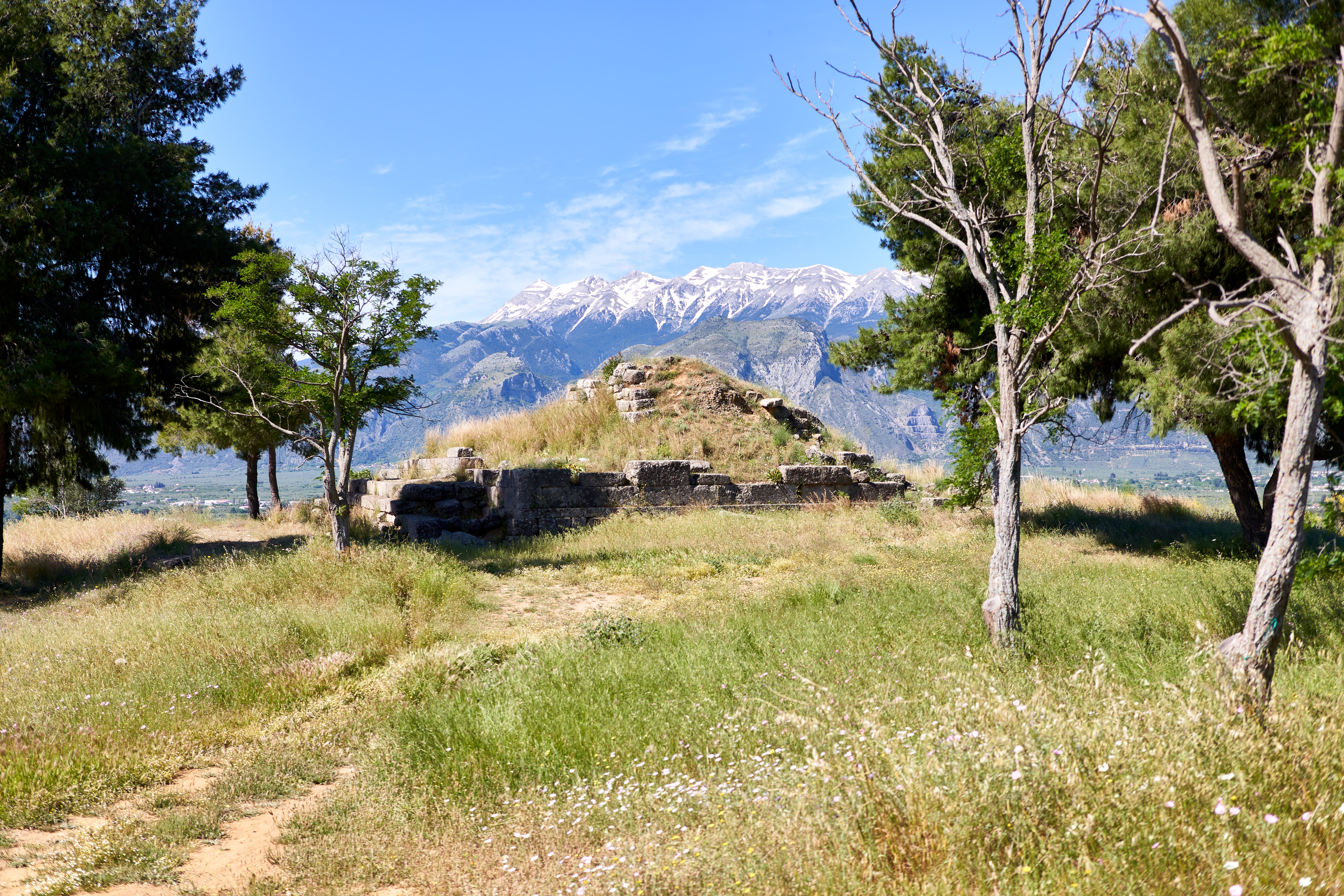
Remains of the temple to Menelaus

Therapne (Ancient Greek: Θεράπνη) was a town in ancient Laconia, within the territory of Sparta.

== Burial of Helen of Troy and Menelaus ==
According to Greek mythology, its name comes from a daughter of Lelex. The place was distinguished for housing the Menelaion, a temple to Menelaus, where it was believed that the bodies of Helen of Troy and Menelaus were buried.

== Sanctuary of Helen ==
Herodotus writes that there was a sanctuary of Helen at Therapne, and relates the tradition that a nurse went every day to that sanctuary to ask that it free a girl from her ugliness and that one day a woman appeared who caressed the hair of the girl and pronounced that she would be the most beautiful girl in Sparta, after which the same day the appearance of the girl changed from ugly to beautiful.

The lyric poet Alcman in the 7th century BCE. mentions a temple in Therapne attesting to the antiquity of the place, There was a festival at the town, which was called Meneleaeia (Μενελάεια) in honour of Menelaus and Helen.

== Connection to the Dioscuri ==
Pindar cites the place as one of the places where the Dioscuri resided.

In Therapne there was also a fountain called Meseida and another called Polideucea. Near Therapne, in a place called Phoebeon, there was a temple dedicated to the Dioscuri, where epheboi were sacrificed. Also near this temple was a sanctuary of Poseidon. Other prominent places in the vicinity of Therapne were a place called Alesia, where tradition said that the mill had been invented and a heroon in honor of Lacedaemon.

== Location ==
Therapne is located near the modern village of Varika. The site of the Menelaion has been excavated numerous times from the 19th century onwards (see Menelaion).
