= Teledice =

Nymph in Greek mythology

In Greek mythology, Teledice (Ancient Greek: Τηλεδικη, romanized: Tēledikē, lit. 'far-justice') may refer to the following characters:

- Teledice, the nymph wife of the first mortal king Phoroneus of Peloponesse, and, according to Pseudo-Apollodorus, the mother of Apis and Niobe. Other sources named the consort(s) of Phoroneus as either Cerdo, Cinna, or Perimede, or Peitho.
- Teledice, wife of King Myles of Laconia, and mother of Eurotas (mythology) and Kepedia. In another version of the text, she was called Cleochareia who bore to Myles two children — Eurotas and Pelias.
