= Polycaon =

In Greek mythology, the name Polycaon (/pəˈlɪkiən/; Ancient Greek: Πολυκάων, romanized: Polykaôn, lit. 'much-burning'") may refer to the following individuals:

- Polycaon, son of Lelex, king of Laconia, by the Naiad nymph, Cleochareia. Polycaon married an ambitious woman named Messene, daughter of King Triopas, of Argos. After his father's death, his brother Myles inherited the throne of Laconia. Messene, not wanting to be the wife of a simple anonymous man, collected an armed force from both Argos and Laconia. The newly married couple invaded the territory of which would be named after Polycaon's wife, Messenia. After establishing the newly conquered kingdom, they founded the city Andania, where they built their palace.
- Polycaon, son of Butes. He married Evaechme, daughter of Hyllus and Iole (thus a granddaughter of Heracles).
