= Cerdo =

Cerdo may refer to:

- Cerdo (mythology), a Greek mythological figure
- Cerdo (gnostic), a Syrian gnostic of the 2nd Century AD
- Kedron of Alexandria, an early patriarch of the Orthodox Church in Alexandria
- "Cerdo", a song by Molotov from their album ¿Dónde Jugarán las Niñas?
- Pig, cerdo is the masculine Spanish word for pig.
