= Cinna (mythology) =

In Greek mythology, Cinna (Ancient Greek: Κίννᾱ, romanized: Kínnā) was the wife of King Phoroneus of Argos by whom she became the mother of Apis and Niobe. Otherwise, the consort(s) of Phoroneus was identified either as the nymph Cerdo, the nymph Teledice, Perimede, or Peitho.
