= Battle of Thermopylae in popular culture =

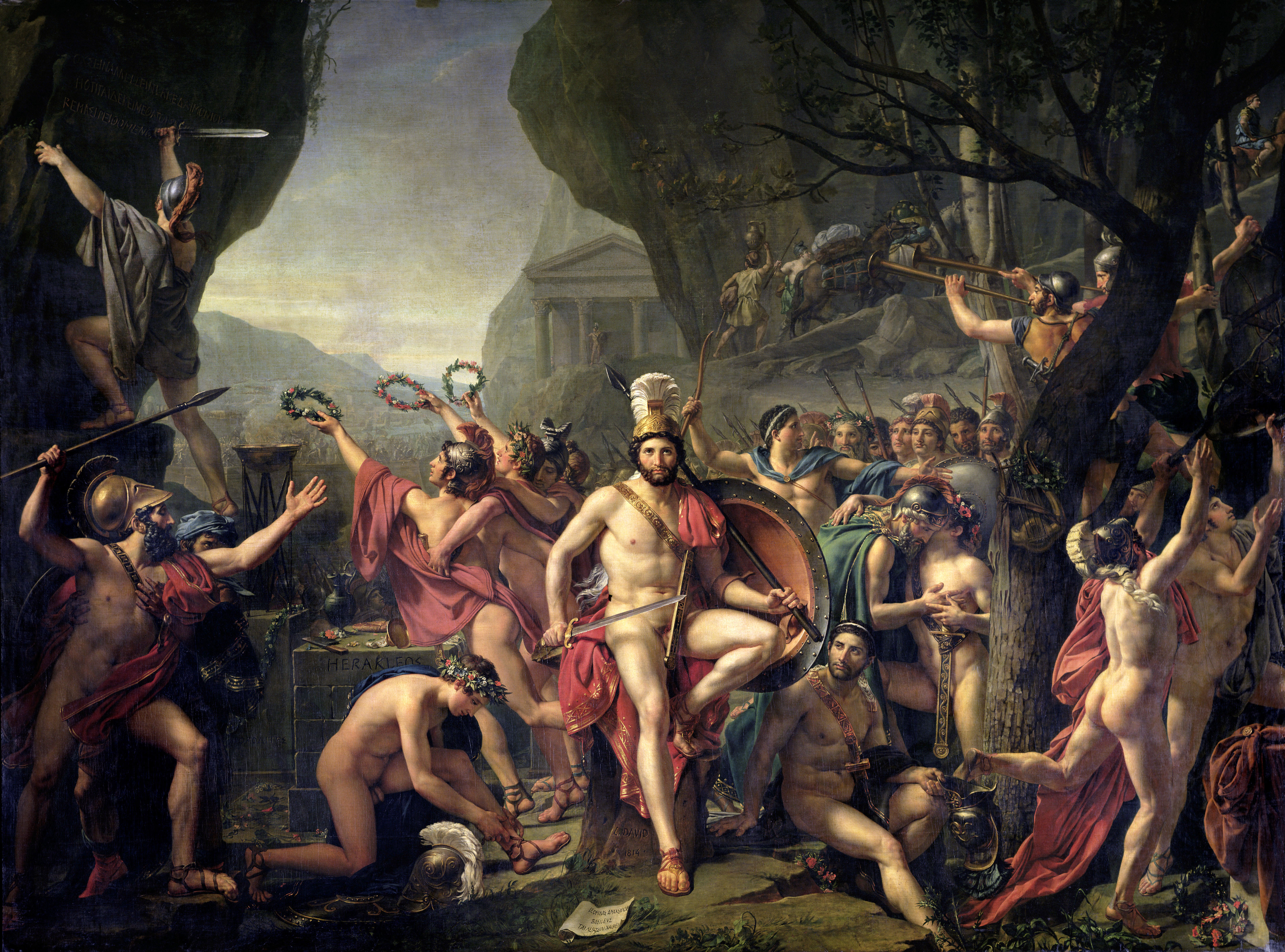
Leonidas at Thermopylae, 1814 painting by Jacques-Louis David

The Battle of Thermopylae in 480 BCE was a last stand by a Greek army led by King Leonidas I of Sparta against an Achaemenid Persian army led by Xerxes I during the Second Persian invasion of Greece. There is a long tradition of upholding the story of the battle as an example of virtuous self-sacrifice.

== Antiquity ==
The battle's earliest known appearance in culture is a series of epigrams commemorating the dead written by Simonides of Ceos in the battle's aftermath. Already by the fourth century BCE, the battle had been reframed as a victory of sorts in Greek writing, in contrast to how it was described by fifth-century BCE Greek historian Herodotus.

== 18th century ==
In Europe, interest in the battle was revitalized in the 1700s with the publication of the poems Leonidas, A Poem by Richard Glover in 1737 and Leonidas by Willem van Haren in 1742. Glover's poem uses the story to exemplify the proper virtues of a good monarch.

Several stage plays about the battle were produced during the French Revolution, including the 1794 play Le Combat de Thermopyles, ou l'école des guerriers by Joseph Marie Loaisel de Tréogate and the 1799 play Léonidas, ou le départ des Spartiates by René-Charles Guilbert de Pixérécourt.

== 19th century ==
Jacques-Louis David painted Leonidas at Thermopylae during the reign of Napoleon and eventually finished the painting in 1814, depicting Leonidas and the soldiers in the moments leading up to the battle as a positive example of patriotism.

German poet Theodor Körner referenced Thermopylae to inspire his fellow countrymen to fight against Napoleon in the 1812 poem Auf dem Schlachtfelde von Aspern. Thermopylae was often invoked as an example to be emulated in the lead-up to the Greek War of Independence against the Ottoman Empire, for example in the 1798 hymn Thourios by Rigas Feraios. In the United States, the Battle of the Alamo in 1836 during the Texas Revolution was compared to Thermopylae only weeks after its conclusion, and a battle memorial erected in Austin, Texas in 1843 references Thermopylae.

== 20th century ==
The 1962 film The 300 Spartans depicts the battle and the broader conflict as a parallel of the then-ongoing Cold War, with Greeks and Persians representing NATO and the Soviet Bloc respectively, and Sparta representing the US. The 1998 novel Gates of Fire by Steven Pressfield is unusual in depicting the battle as gruesome rather than glorious.

== See also ==
- 300 (comics) – 1998 comic-book limited series
- 300 (film) – 2006 American epic action film by Zack Snyder
- Gates of Fire (album)
