= Phaenna =

One of the Graces in Greek mythology

In Greek mythology, Phaenna (Ancient Greek: Φαέννα, romanized: Phaénna, lit. 'shining') was one of the Charites (the Graces). She was worshipped in Laconia, the region in ancient Greece where Sparta was located.

== Etymology ==
Her name translates to "bright".

== Worship ==
According to Pausanias, in the second century the Lacedaemonians claimed that the Charites were two, and gave them the names of Cleta and Phaenna. Pausanias also says that according to local legend, the mythical king Lacedaemon founded their sanctuary and gave them their names; the sanctuary stood near the river Tiasa.

== Bibliography ==
- Harrison, Jane Ellen (1991). Prolegomena to the Study of Greek Religion. ISBN 978-0-6910-1514-9.
- Keightley, Thomas; Schmitz, Leonhard (2010). The Mythology of Ancient Greece and Italy. ISBN 978-1-1625-9591-7.
- Pausanias, Description of Greece with an English Translation by W.H.S. Jones, Litt.D., and H.A. Ormerod, M.A., in 4 Volumes. Cambridge, MA, Harvard University Press; London, William Heinemann Ltd. 1918. ISBN 0-674-99328-4. Online version at the Perseus Digital Library.
