= Clete =

Clete is a given name. Notable people with the name include:

- Greek mythological figures:
  - Clete or Cleta, one of the Charites
  - Clete (Amazon), companion of Penthesilea
- Astronomy:
  - 385695 Clete, a minor planet
- People:
  - Clete Blakeman (born 1965), official in the National Football League since the 2008 NFL season
  - Clete Boyer (1937–2007), Major League Baseball player
  - Clete Donald Johnson, Jr.
  - Clete Roberts (1912–1984), pioneer in Los Angeles local broadcast journalism
  - Clete Thomas (born 1983), A Major League Baseball outfielder previously with the Detroit Tigers organization, now a part of the Minnesota Twins

== See also ==
- Klete Keller (born 1982), American freestyle swimmer and Olympic medallist
- Cleat (disambiguation)
- Crete, Greek island
