= Cleat =

Cleat may refer to:

- Cleat (nautical), a fitting on ships and boats to which ropes are secured.
- Cleat hitch, a knot
- Cleat, Orkney, a place in Scotland
- Cleat (shoe), a type or part of a shoe
- Cleats (comic strip), a comic strip by Bill Hinds
- Grouser, a protrusion on a wheel or continuous vehicle track, intended to increase traction
- Fractures in coal seams
- French cleat, a type of molding

== See also ==
- Clete
