= Niobe (Argive) =

Daughter of Phoroneus in Greek mythology

In Greek mythology, Niobe (/ˈnaɪ.ə.biː/; Ancient Greek: Νιόβη, romanized: Nióbē, pronounced [ni.óbɛː]) was a daughter of Phoroneus and Teledice, the sister of Apis, and the mother by Zeus of Argus, who was the eponym of Argos. She may have appeared in the lost genealogical epic Catalogue of Women, as part of the family tree of Inachids, one of the mythological royal dynasties of Argos.

According to a lost work by the sixth-century BCE mythographer Acusilaus – cited by Apollodorus in his Bibliotheca – and the Pseudo-Clementine Writings (written in the third century CE), she was also the mother of Pelasgus. Acusilaus also claimed she was the first woman to ever have sex with Zeus. Niobe is not to be confused with the more famous Niobe, who was punished for boasting that she had more children than Leto.
