= Leleges =

Pre-Hellenic aboriginal people of the Aegean

The Leleges (/ˈlɛlɪdʒiːz/; Ancient Greek: Λέλεγες) were an aboriginal people of the Aegean region, before the Greeks arrived. They were distinct from another pre-Hellenic people of the region, the Pelasgians. The exact areas to which they were native are uncertain, since they were apparently pre-literate and the only references to them are in ancient Greek sources. These references are casual and (it is alleged) sometimes fictitious. Likewise, little is known about the language of the Leleges.

Many Greek authors link the Leleges to the Carians of south-west Anatolia. Homer names the Leleges among the Trojan allies alongside the Carians, Pelasgians, Paeonians and Gaucones.

== Etymology ==
It is thought that the name Leleges is an exonym, in a long-extinct language, rather than an endonym (or autonym). That is, during the Bronze Age the word lulahi apparently meaning "strangers" was used in the Luwian language and in other Anatolian languages. For example, in a Hittite cuneiform inscription, priests and temple servants are directed to avoid conversing with lulahi and foreign merchants. According to the suggestion of Vitaly Shevoroshkin, an attempt to transliterate lulahi into Greek might result in leleges.

Late traditions reported in Pseudo-Apollodorus, Bibliotheke, and by Pausanias, derive the name from an eponymous king Lelex; a comparable etymology, memorializing a legendary founder, is provided by Greek mythographers for virtually every tribe of Hellenes: "Lelex and the Leleges, whatever their historical significance, have acted as a blank sheet on which to draw Lakonia and all it means," observes Ken Dowden.

== Ancient sources on Leleges ==
=== Anatolia ===
In Homer's Iliad, the Leleges are allies of the Trojans (10.429), though they do not appear in the formal catalogue of allies in Book II of the Iliad, and their homeland is not specified. They are distinguished from the Carians, with whom some later writers confused them; they have a king, Altes, and a city Pedasus which was sacked by Achilles. The topographical name "Pedasus" occurs in several ancient places: near Cyzicus, in the Troad on the Satniois River, in Caria, as well as in Messenia, according to Encyclopædia Britannica 1911. Gargara in the Troad was counted as Lelegian. Alcaeus (7th or 6th century BCE) calls Antandrus in the Troad "Lelegian", but later Herodotus substitutes the epithet "Pelasgian", so perhaps the two designations were broadly synonymous for the Greeks.

According to Homer, the Leleges were a distinct Anatolian tribe. However, Herodotus states that Leleges had been an early name for the Carians.

Pherecydes of Athens (ca 480 BC) attributed to the Leleges the coast land of Caria, from Ephesus to Phocaea, with the islands of Samos and Chios, placing the true Carians farther south from Ephesus to Miletus.

Pausanias was reminded that the temple of the goddess at Ephesus predated the Ionian colony there, when it was rededicated to the goddess as Artemis. He states with certainty that it antedated the Ionic immigration by many years, being older even than the oracular shrine at Dodona. He says that the pre-Ionic inhabitants of the city were Leleges and Lydians (with a predominance of the latter) and that, although Androclus drove out of the land all those whom he found in the upper city, he did not interfere with those who dwelt about the sanctuary. By giving and receiving pledges he put these on a footing of neutrality. These remarks of Pausanias find confirmation in the form of the cult in historic times, centering on a many-breasted icon of the "Lady of Ephesus" whom Greeks called Artemis. Other cult aspects, being in all essentials non-Hellenic, suggest the indigenous cult was taken over by the Greek settlers.

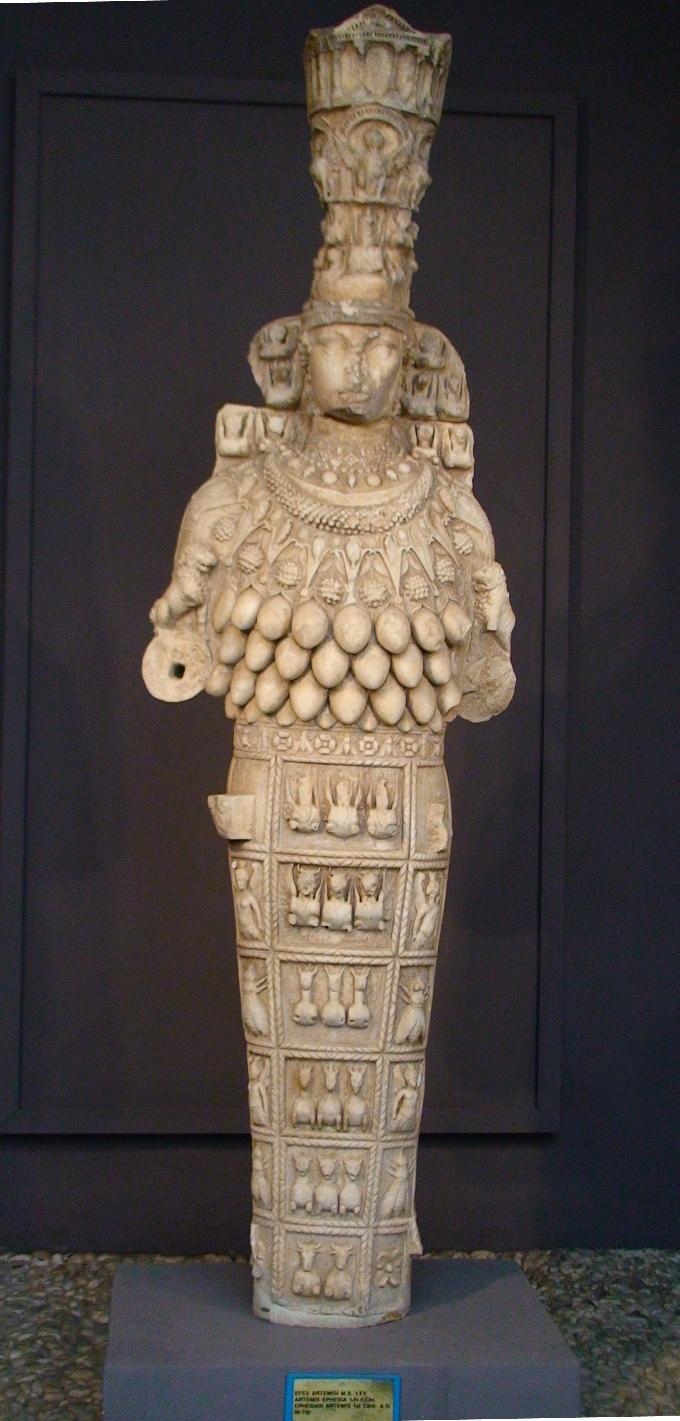
The Lady of Ephesus, 1st century AD, Ephesus Archaeological Museum

Often historians assume, as a general rule, that autochthonous inhabitants survive an invasion as an under-class where they do not retreat to mountain districts, so it is interesting to hear in Deipnosophistae that Philippus of Theangela (a 4th-century BC historian) referred to Leleges still surviving as serfs of the "true Carians", and even later Strabo attributes to the Leleges a distinctive group of deserted forts and tombs in Caria that were still known in his day as "Lelegean forts"; the Encyclopædia Britannica 1911 identified these as ruins that could still be traced ranging from the neighborhood of Theangela and Halicarnassus as far north as Miletus, the southern limit of the "true Carians" of Pherecydes. Plutarch also implies the historic existence of Lelegian serfs at Tralles (now Aydın) in the interior.

=== Greece and the Aegean ===
The fourth-century BC historian Philippus of Theangela suggested that the Leleges maintained connections to Messenia, Laconia, Locris and other regions in mainland Greece, after they were overcome by the Carians in Asia Minor.

A single passage in the fragmentary Hesiodic Catalogue of Women places "Leleges" in Deucalion's mythicized and archaic time in Locris in central Greece, identified as the rocks turned human that repopulated the earth after the great deluge. Locris is also the refuge of some of the Pelasgian inhabitants forced from Boeotia by Cadmus and his Phoenician adventurers. But not until the 4th century BCE does any other writer place Leleges anywhere west of the Aegean. But the confusion of the Leleges with the Carians (immigrant conquerors akin to Lydians and Mysians) which first appears in a Cretan legend (quoted by Herodotus, but repudiated, as he says, by the Carians themselves) and is repeated by Callisthenes, Apollodorus, and other later writers, led easily to the suggestion of Callisthenes, that Leleges joined the Carians in their (half legendary) raids on the coasts of Greece.

Herodotus (1.171) says that the Leleges were a people who in old times dwelt in the islands of the Aegean and were subject to Minos of Crete (one of the historic references that led Sir Arthur Evans to name the pre-Hellenic Cretan culture "Minoan"); and that they were driven from their homes by the Dorians and Ionians, after which they took refuge in Caria and were named Carians. Herodotus was a Dorian Greek born in Caria himself.

Meanwhile, other writers from the 4th century onwards claimed to discover them in Boeotia, west Acarnania (Leucas), and later again in Thessaly, Euboea, Megara, Lacedaemon and Messenia. In Messenia, they were reputed to have been immigrant founders of Pylos, and were connected with the seafaring Taphians and Teleboans, and distinguished from the Pelasgians. However, in Lacedaemon and in Leucas they were believed to be aboriginal and Dionysius of Halicarnassus mentions that Leleges is the old name for the later Locrians. These European Leleges must be interpreted in connection with the recurrence of place names like Pedasus, Physcus, Larymna and Abae, both in Caria, and in these "Lelegian" parts of Greece. Perhaps this is the result of some early migration; perhaps it is also the cause of these Lelegian theories; perhaps there was a widespread pre-Indo-European culture that loosely linked these regions, a possibility on which much modern hypothesis has been constructed. Germanic theorists of the 19th century who inspired modern heirs:

- H. Kiepert. "Über den Volksstamm der Leleges", (in Monatsberichte Berliner Akademie, 1861, p. 114) asserted that the Leleges were an aboriginal people and linked them to Illyrians.
- K. W. Deimling. Die Leleger (Leipzig, 1862), places their origins in southwest Asia Minor, and brings them thence to Greece, essentially repeating the classical Greek view.
- G. F. Unger. "Hellas in Thessalien," in Philologus, supplement. ii. (1863), made them Phoenician.
- E. Curtius. History of Greece, (vol. i) even distinguished a "Lelegian" phase of nascent Aegean culture.

== Bibliography ==
- Dowden, Ken (1992). "Myth and identity". The Uses of Greek Mythology. Routledge. pp. 53-66. ISBN 0-203-13857-0.
