= Cerdo (mythology) =

Wife of Phoroneus in Greek mythology

In Greek mythology, Cerdo (Ancient Greek: Κερδώ, romanized: Kerdōn, lit. 'purveyor of gain', 'the wily one' or 'weasel/ vixen') was, according to Pausanias, the wife of King Phoroneus of Argos. In other sources the consort of Phoroneus was called either Cinna, Teledice, Perimede, or Peitho.

Pausanias stated that she had a tomb at the agora of Argos, next to a temple of Asclepius. The presence of the tomb indicates that she had a cult there.
