= Sparta (mythology) =

Mythical queen of ancient Sparta

- Queen of Lacedaemon
- Member of the Spartan Royal Family
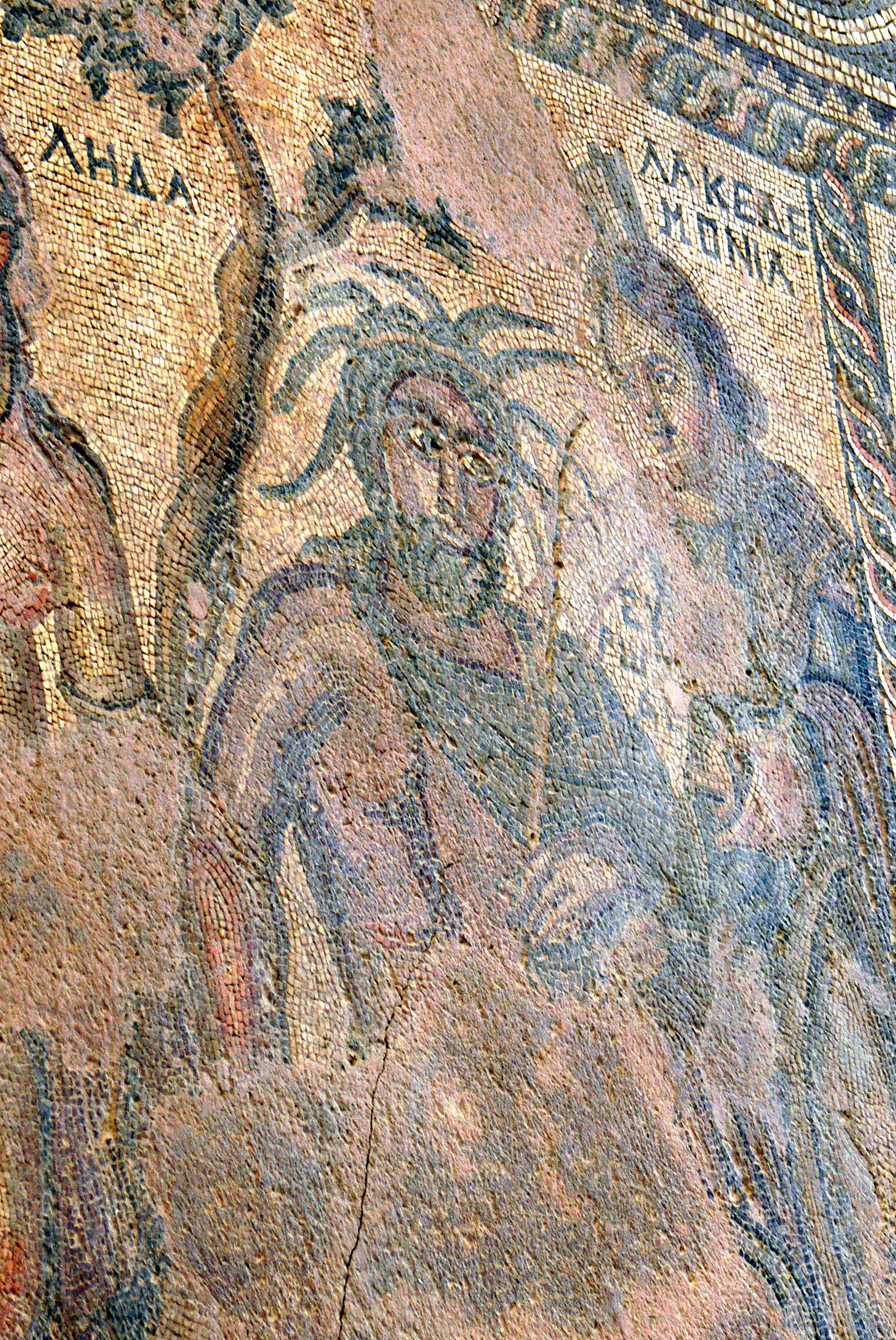
- Paphos Archaeological Park. House of Aion: Personifications of river Eurotas and Sparta (Lakedaimonia).
- Abode: Laconia

Genealogy
- Parents: Eurotas and Clete
- Siblings: Tiasa
- Consort: Lacedaemon
- Children: Amyclas and Eurydice

In Greek mythology, Sparta (Doric Greek: Σπάρτα, romanized: Spártā; Attic Greek: Σπάρτη, romanized: Spártē) was the ancient Queen of Sparta, which was named in her honour.

== Family ==
Sparta was the daughter of King Eurotas of Laconia and Cleta. Pausanias also describes Tiasa as being Eurotas's daughter.

By her husband, Lacedaemon, Sparta became the mother of Amyclas and Eurydice, wife of King Acrisius of Argos, and the grandmother of Hyacinthus, who was loved by Apollo and Zephyrus. She was also an ancestor of King Tyndareus of Sparta and his brother Icarius and their children Clytemnestra, Castor and Penelope.

== Mythology ==
According to traditions recorded by Pausanias, Sparta's father having no male heirs bequeathed his kingdom to Lacedaemon. When he became king, he changed the name of the land and the inhabitants to Lacedaemon and Lacedaemonians, respectively, and he founded the City of Sparta, which was named after his wife.

Sparta was represented on a sacrificial tripod at Amyclae.

== Family tree ==
Argive genealogy in Greek mythology

Oceanus	Tethys
Inachus	Melia
Zeus	Io	Phoroneus
Epaphus	Memphis
Libya	Poseidon
Achiroë	Belus	Agenor	Telephassa
Danaus	Elephantis	Aegyptus	Cadmus	Cilix	Europa	Phoenix
Mantineus	Hypermnestra	Lynceus	Harmonia	Zeus
Sparta	Lacedaemon	Ocalea	Abas	Polydorus	Agave	Sarpedon	Rhadamanthus
Eurydice	Acrisius	Autonoë	Ino	Minos
Zeus	Danaë	Semele	Zeus
Perseus	Dionysus

Colour key:

Male
Female
Deity
