= Lacedaemon (mythology) =

King of Sparta

Lacedaemon (/læsɪˈdiːmən/; Ancient Greek: Λακεδαίμων, romanized: Lakedaímōn) or Lacaedemon was the eponymous king of Lacedaemon (i.e. Sparta) in classical Greek mythology.

== Family ==
Lacedaemon was the son of Zeus and the Pleiad Taygete. By Princess Sparta, the daughter of former King Eurotas, he was the father of his heir Amyclas and Eurydice, wife of King Acrisius of Argos.

In a rare version of the myth, Taygete was the wife of Lacedaemon and their children were Himerus and Cleodice.

== Mythology ==
Lacedemon was credited to be the founder of the sanctuary of the Graces, Cleta and Phaenna, near the river Tiasa.

== Notes ==
Regnal titles
Preceded by Eurotas	King of Sparta	Succeeded by Amyclas
