= Cleta =

Greek goddess

In Greek mythology, Cleta (/ˈkliːtə/; Ancient Greek: Κλήτα, romanized: Klḗta, lit. 'the glorious', 'renowned' or 'famed') may refer to the following characters:

- Cleta, one of the two Charites (Graces), the other Phaenna, at Sparta. These goddesses had a sanctuary near the river Tiasa and It was believed that Lacedaemonians founded the sanctuary for the Graces there, and gave them their names. In one account, she was called the mother of Sparta by King Eurotas (mythology) of Laconia.
- Cleta, the nurse of Penthesilea. She set out to Troy to meet the Amazonian queen there but her ship was blown off course and ended up in Italy where she founded the city of Clete.
