= Lelex =

In Greek mythology, Lelex (/ˈliːlɪks/; Ancient Greek: Λέλεξ, gen. Λέλεγος) may refer to the following personages:

- Lelex (king of Sparta), the first king of Sparta.
- Lelex (king of Megara), king of Megara.
- Lelex, one of the Calydonian hunters, who was described as "the gray-haired hero Lelex". Coming from Narycus in Opuntian Locris, he was already a mature man during that hunt.
