= Pelias (mythology) =

In Greek mythology, Pelias (/ˈpiːliæs/; Ancient Greek: Πελίας) may refer to the following characters:

- Pelias, king of Iolcus and uncle of Jason who sent him to fetch the Golden Fleece.
- Pelias, a son of Aeginetes, descendant of King Amyclas of Laconia. Through his son Ampyx, Pelias was the ancestor of Patreus who founded Patras.
- Pelias, father of Iphidamas and Eurydamas who were both counted among the Achaeans in the Trojan War.
- Pelias, a Trojan warrior who participated in the siege of Troy. During the war, he was wounded by Odysseus.
