= Sparta =

City-state in ancient Greece

Lacedaemon Λακεδαίμων (Ancient Greek)
- Greek Dark Ages c.900 BC–188 BC
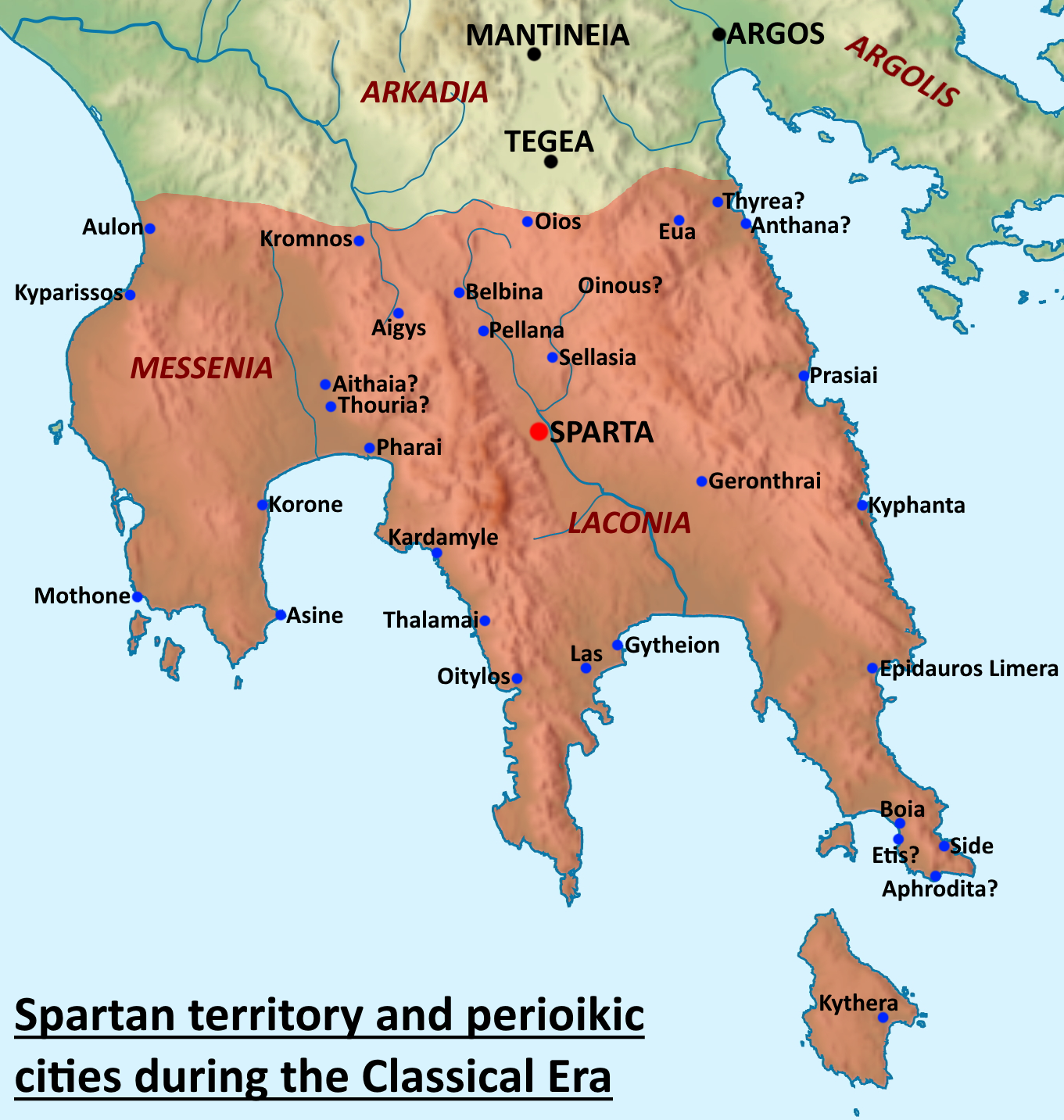
- Territory of ancient Sparta before 371 BC, with Perioecic cities in blue
- Capital: Sparta; 37°4′55″N 22°25′25″E
- Common languages: Doric Greek
- Religion: Greek polytheism
- Government: Spartan politeia
- Kings
  - c. 930–900 BC: Agis I
  - 489–480 BC: Leonidas I
  - 207–192 BC: Nabis
- Legislature: Ephors; Gerousia
- Historical era: Classical antiquity
  - Foundation: Greek Dark Ages c.900 BC
  - First Messenian War, Second Messenian War: 743–724 BC, c. 660–650 BC
  - Foundation of the Peloponnesian league: c. 550 BC
  - War against Argos: 494 BC
  - Battle of Thermopylae: 480 BC
  - Battle of Plataea: 479 BC
  - Peloponnesian War: 431–404 BC
  - Spartan hegemony: 404–371 BC
  - Battle of Leuctra: 371 BC
  - Battle of Sellasia: 222 BC
  - War against Nabis: 195 BC
  - Annexed by Achaean League: 188 BC
Preceded by	Succeeded by
Greek Dark Ages; Messenia (ancient region)	Achaean League

Sparta (Note: Doric Greek: Σπάρτα, romanised: Spártā; Attic Greek: Σπάρτη, romanised: Spártē) was a prominent ancient Greek polis in Laconia. In classical antiquity, the state was known as Lacedaemon (Λακεδαίμων, Lakedaímōn), while Sparta referred to its capital, a group of villages in the valley of the Evrotas River in Laconia, in the southeastern Peloponnese. During the 7th century BC, it rose to become the most prominent land military power in the Greek world, a status it retained until its defeat at Leuctra in 371 BC.

In the 6th century BC Sparta founded the Peloponnesian League, establishing its hegemony over most of Peloponnese. During the second Persian invasion of Greece, Sparta was recognised as the leading land force of the Hellenic alliance that also included the rising maritime power of Athens. The Spartan army was crucial in the battles of Thermopylae and Plataea under the leadership of Leonidas and Pausanias respectively. Sparta led the Peloponnesian League against the Athenian Empire during the Peloponnesian War (431–404 BC), from which it emerged victorious after Lysander's victory at the naval Battle of Aegospotami. A short period of Spartan hegemony followed, when Spartan armies under Agesilaus II led a series of campaigns in western Anatolian satrapies of the Achaemenid empire to protect the Ionian cities. However, Epaminondas' victory over Sparta at Leuctra in 371 BC started the Theban hegemony while Messenia was freed from Spartan rule; the loss of the slave labour this region provided sent the city into terminal decline as a military power.

Nonetheless, Sparta tried to reclaim its hegemony in Peloponnese several times until it was annexed by the Achaean League in early 2nd century BC. The city recovered some autonomy after the Roman conquest of Greece in 146 BC and became a tourist destination during the Roman era, restoring some measure of prosperity. However, Sparta was sacked in 396 AD by the Visigothic king Alaric, and underwent a long period of decline into the medieval period, when much of its population relocated to the nearby Mystras. Modern Sparta is a provincial town and the seat of the Laconia regional administration.

Sparta was unique in ancient Greece for its social system and constitution, which were supposedly introduced by the semi-mythical lawgiver Lycurgus. Spartan society was exceptionally militarised, focusing the entire attention of the Spartiate class on military training and physical development to the point of legally barring them from productive economic activity. The inhabitants of Sparta were rigidly stratified into Spartiates (citizens with full rights), mothakes and perioikoi (free non-citizens), and helots (state-owned enslaved non-Spartan locals), with helots making up the vast majority of the population; social mobility was nearly nonexistent. Spartiate men underwent the harsh agoge training regimen, and Spartan phalanx units were widely considered to be among the best in battle, though this was as much a matter of propaganda as battlefield prowess. Free Spartiate women enjoyed somewhat greater legal rights than elsewhere in classical antiquity, though helots suffered exceptionally harsh treatment at the hands of the Spartiates (particularly the Crypteia), causing repeated revolts. Sparta was a subject of fascination in its own day, as well as in later Western culture following the revival of classical learning. The admiration of Sparta is known as Laconophilia.

== Names ==
The ancient Greeks used one of three words to refer to the Spartan city-state and its location. First, "Sparta" refers primarily to the main cluster of settlements in the valley of the Eurotas River. The second word, "Lacedaemon" (Λακεδαίμων), was often used as an adjective and is the name referenced in the works of Homer and the historians Herodotus and Thucydides. The third term, "Laconice" (Λακωνική), referred to the immediate area around the town of Sparta, the plateau east of the Taygetos mountains, and sometimes to all the regions under direct Spartan control, including Messenia.

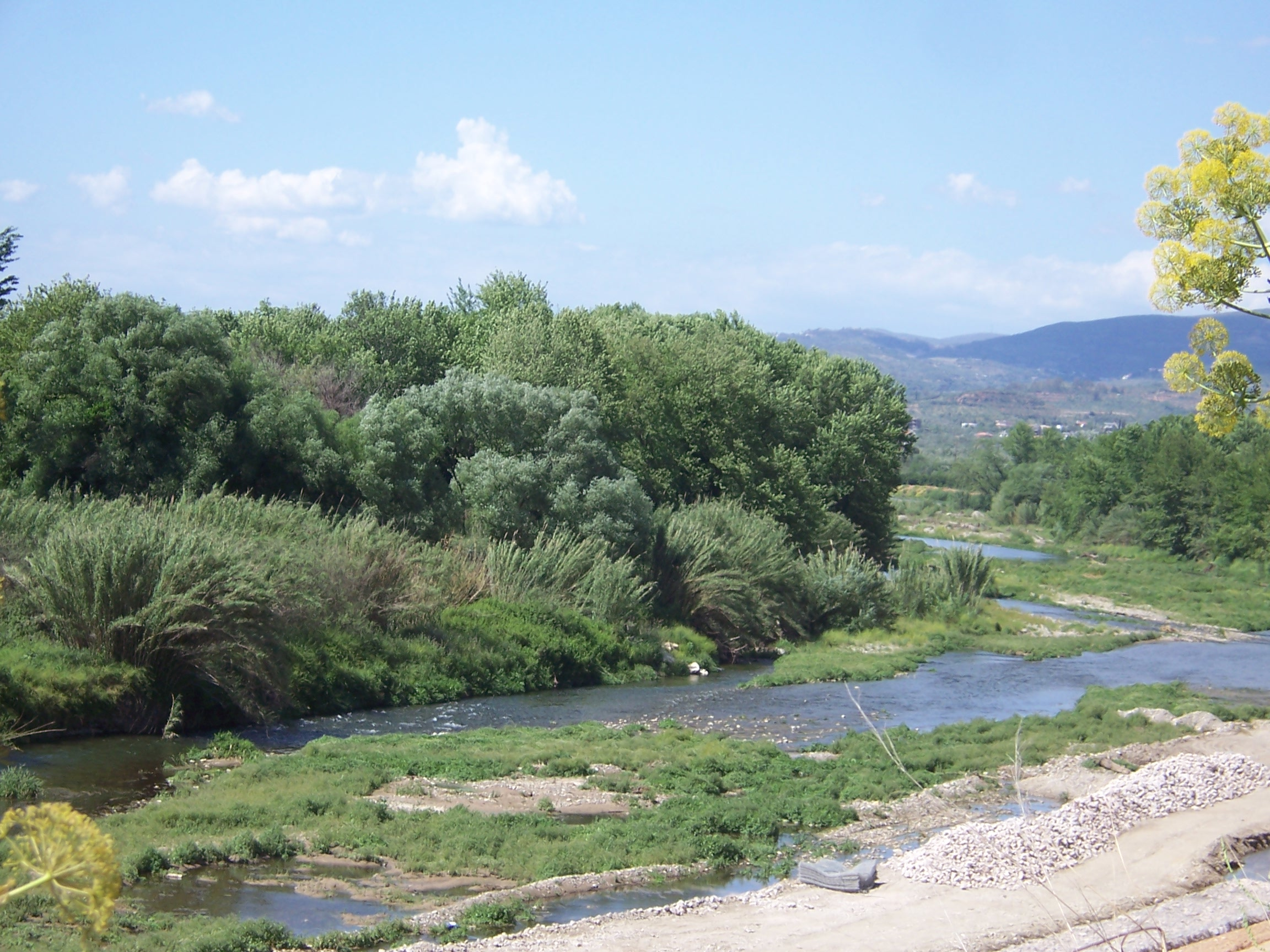
Eurotas River

The earliest attested term referring to Lacedaemon is the Mycenaean Greek 𐀨𐀐𐀅𐀖𐀛𐀍, ra-ke-da-mi-ni-jo, "Lakedaimonian", written in Linear B syllabic script, (Note: Found on the following tablets: TH Fq 229, TH Fq 258, TH Fq 275, TH Fq 253, TH Fq 284, TH Fq 325, TH Fq 339, TH Fq 382. There are also words like 𐀨𐀐𐀅𐀖𐀛𐀍𐀄𐀍, ra-ke-da-mo-ni-jo-u-jo – found on the TH Gp 227 tablet – that could perhaps mean "son of the Spartan". Moreover, the attested words 𐀨𐀐𐀅𐀜 , ra-ke-da-no and 𐀐𐀅𐀜𐀩, ra-ke-da-no-re could possibly be Linear B forms of Lacedaemon itself; the latter, found on the MY Ge 604 tablet, is considered to be the dative case form of the former which is found on the MY Ge 603 tablet. It is considered much more probable though that ra-ke-da-no and ra-ke-da-no-re correspond to the anthroponym Λακεδάνωρ, Lakedanor, though the latter is thought to be related etymologically to Lacedaemon.) the equivalent of the later Greek Λακεδαιμόνιος, Lakedaimonios (Latin: Lacedaemonius).

Herodotus seems to use "Lacedaemon" for the Mycenaean Greek citadel at Therapne, in contrast to the lower town of Sparta. This term could be used synonymously with Sparta, but typically it denoted the region in which the city was located. In Homer it is typically combined with epithets of the countryside: wide, lovely, shining and most often hollow and broken (full of ravines), suggesting the Eurotas Valley. "Sparta" on the other hand is described as "the country of lovely women", an epithet for people.

The residents of Sparta were often called Lacedaemonians. This epithet utilised the plural of the adjective Lacedaemonius (Greek: Λακεδαιμόνιοι; Latin: Lacedaemonii, but also Lacedaemones). The ancients sometimes used a back-formation, referring to the land of Lacedaemon as Lacedaemonian country. As most words for "country" were feminine, the adjective was in the feminine: Lacedaemonia (Λακεδαιμονία, Lakedaimonia). Eventually, the adjective came to be used alone.

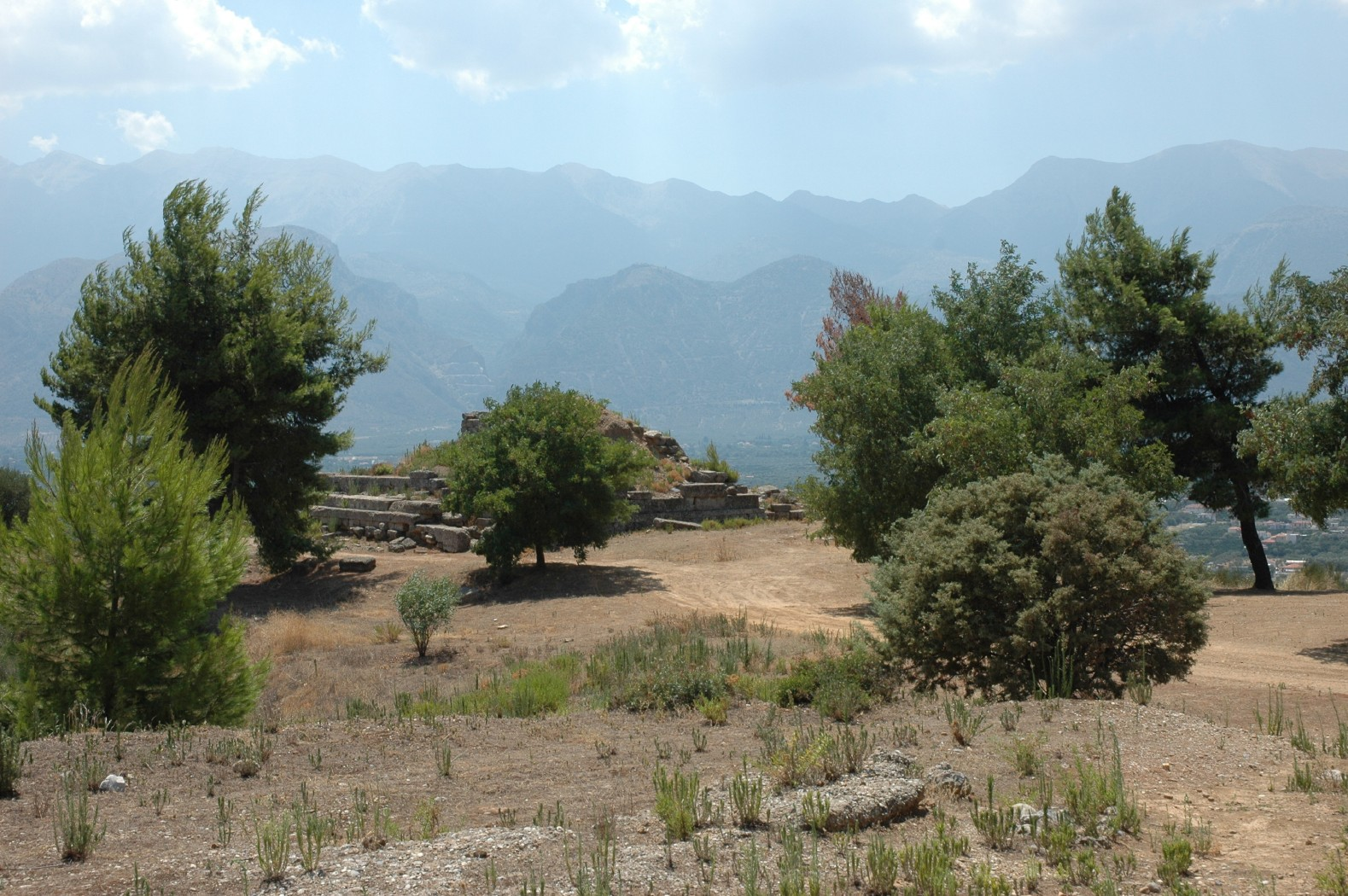
Hollow Lacedaemon. Site of the Menelaion, the ancient shrine to Helen and Menelaus constructed in the Bronze Age city that stood on the hill of Therapne on the left bank of the Eurotas River overlooking the future site of Dorian Sparta. Across the valley the successive ridges of Mount Taygetus are in evidence.

"Lacedaemonia" was not in general use during the classical period and before. It does occur in Greek as an equivalent of Laconia and Messenia during the Roman and early Byzantine periods, mostly in ethnographers and lexica of place names. For example, Hesychius of Alexandria's Lexicon (5th century AD) defines Agiadae as a "place in Lacedaemonia" named after Agis. The actual transition may be captured by Isidore of Seville's Etymologiae (7th century AD), an etymological dictionary. Isidore relied heavily on Orosius's Historiarum Adversum Paganos (5th century AD) and Eusebius of Caesarea's Chronicon (early 5th century AD), as did Orosius. The latter defines Sparta to be Lacedaemonia Civitas, but Isidore defines Lacedaemonia as founded by Lacedaemon, son of Semele, which is consistent with Eusebius's explanation. There is a rare use, perhaps the earliest of "Lacedaemonia", in Diodorus Siculus's The Library of History, but probably with Χώρα (chōra, "country") suppressed.

Lakedaimona was until 2006 the name of a province in the modern Greek prefecture of Laconia.

== Geography ==
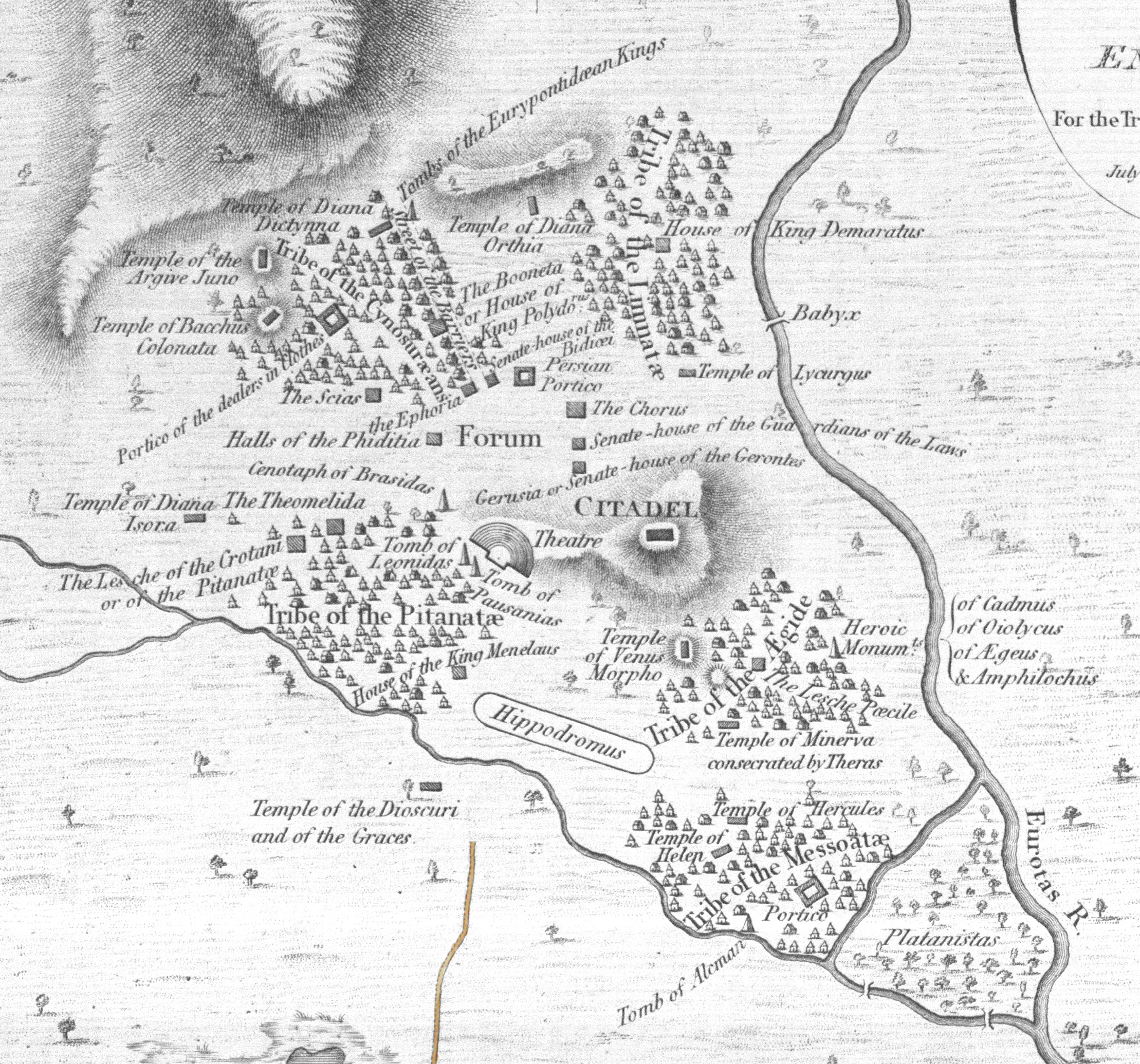
Antique map of classical city of Sparta (based on ancient sources and not archaeology)

Sparta is located in the region of Laconia, in the south-eastern Peloponnese. Ancient Sparta was built on the banks of the Eurotas, the largest river of Laconia, which provided it with a source of fresh water. The Eurotas valley was a natural fortress, bounded to the west by Mt. Taygetus (2,407 m) and to the east by Mt. Parnon (1,935 m). To the north, Laconia is separated from Arcadia by hilly uplands reaching 1000 m in altitude. These natural defences worked to Sparta's advantage and protected it from sacking and invasion. Though landlocked, Sparta had a vassal harbour, Gytheio, on the Laconian Gulf.

== Mythology ==
Lacedaemon (Greek: Λακεδαίμων) was a mythical king of Laconia. The son of Zeus by the nymph Taygete, he married Sparta, the daughter of Eurotas, by whom he became the father of Amyclas, Eurydice, and Asine. As king, he named his country after himself and the city after his wife. He was believed to have built the sanctuary of the Charites, which stood between Sparta and Amyclae, and to have given to those divinities the names of Cleta and Phaenna. A shrine was erected to him in the neighbourhood of Therapne.

Tyrtaeus, an archaic era Spartan writer, is the earliest source to connect the origin myth of the Spartans to the lineage of the hero Heracles; later authors, such as Diodorus Siculus, Herodotus, and Apollodorus, also made mention of Spartans understanding themselves to be descendants of Heracles.

== Archaeology of the classical period ==
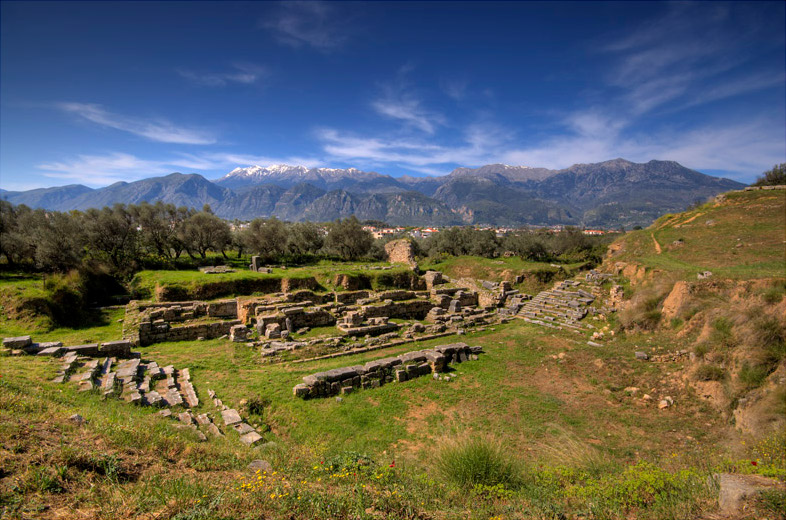
The theatre of ancient Sparta with Mt. Taygetus in the background

Thucydides wrote:

Suppose the city of Sparta to be deserted, and nothing left but the temples and the ground-plan, distant ages would be very unwilling to believe that the power of the Lacedaemonians was at all equal to their fame. Their city is not built continuously, and has no splendid temples or other edifices; it rather resembles a group of villages, like the ancient towns of Hellas, and would therefore make a poor show.

Until the early 20th century, the chief ancient buildings at Sparta were the theatre, of which, however, little showed above ground except portions of the retaining walls; the so-called Tomb of Leonidas, a quadrangular building, perhaps a temple, constructed of immense blocks of stone and containing two chambers; the foundation of an ancient bridge over the Eurotas; the ruins of a circular structure; some remains of late Roman fortifications; several brick buildings and mosaic pavements.

The remaining archaeological wealth consisted of inscriptions, sculptures, and other objects collected in the local museum, founded by Stamatakis in 1872 and enlarged in 1907. Partial excavation of the round building was undertaken in 1892 and 1893 by the American School at Athens. The structure has been since found to be a semicircular retaining wall of Hellenic origin that was partly restored during the Roman period.

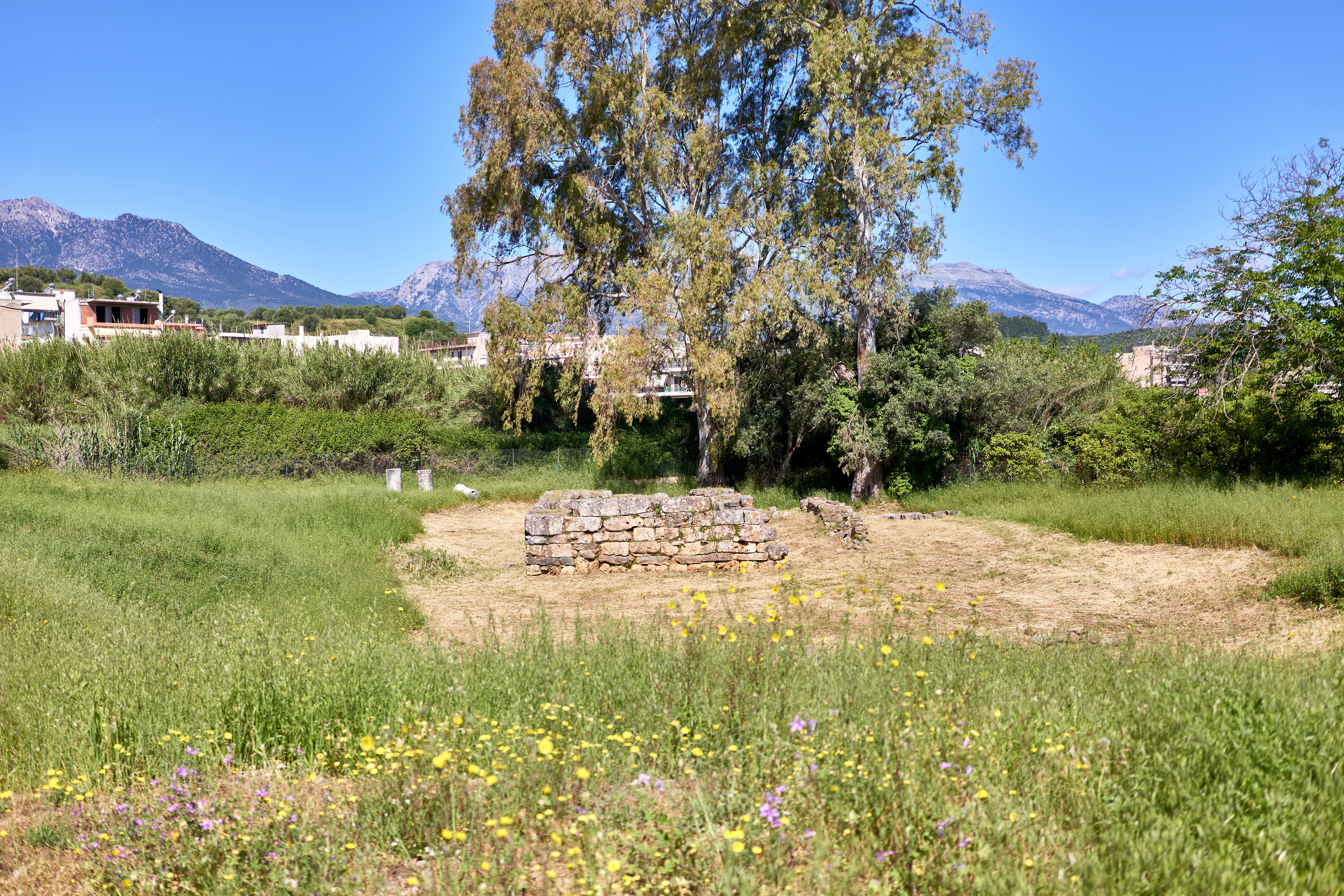
Ruins of the Temple of Artemis Orthia

In 1904, the British School at Athens began a thorough exploration of Laconia, and in the following year excavations were made at Thalamae, Geronthrae, and Angelona near Monemvasia. In 1906, excavations began in Sparta itself.

A "small circus" (as described by Leake) proved to be a theatre-like building constructed soon after 200 AD around the altar and in front of the Temple of Artemis Orthia. It is believed that musical and gymnastic contests took place here, as well as the famous flogging ordeal administered to Spartan boys (diamastigosis). The temple, which can be dated to the 2nd century BC, rests on the foundation of an older temple of the 6th century, and close beside it were found the remains of a yet earlier temple, dating from the 9th or even the 10th century. The votive offerings in clay, amber, bronze, ivory and lead dating from the 9th to the 4th centuries BC, which were found in great profusion within the precinct range, supply invaluable information about early Spartan art.

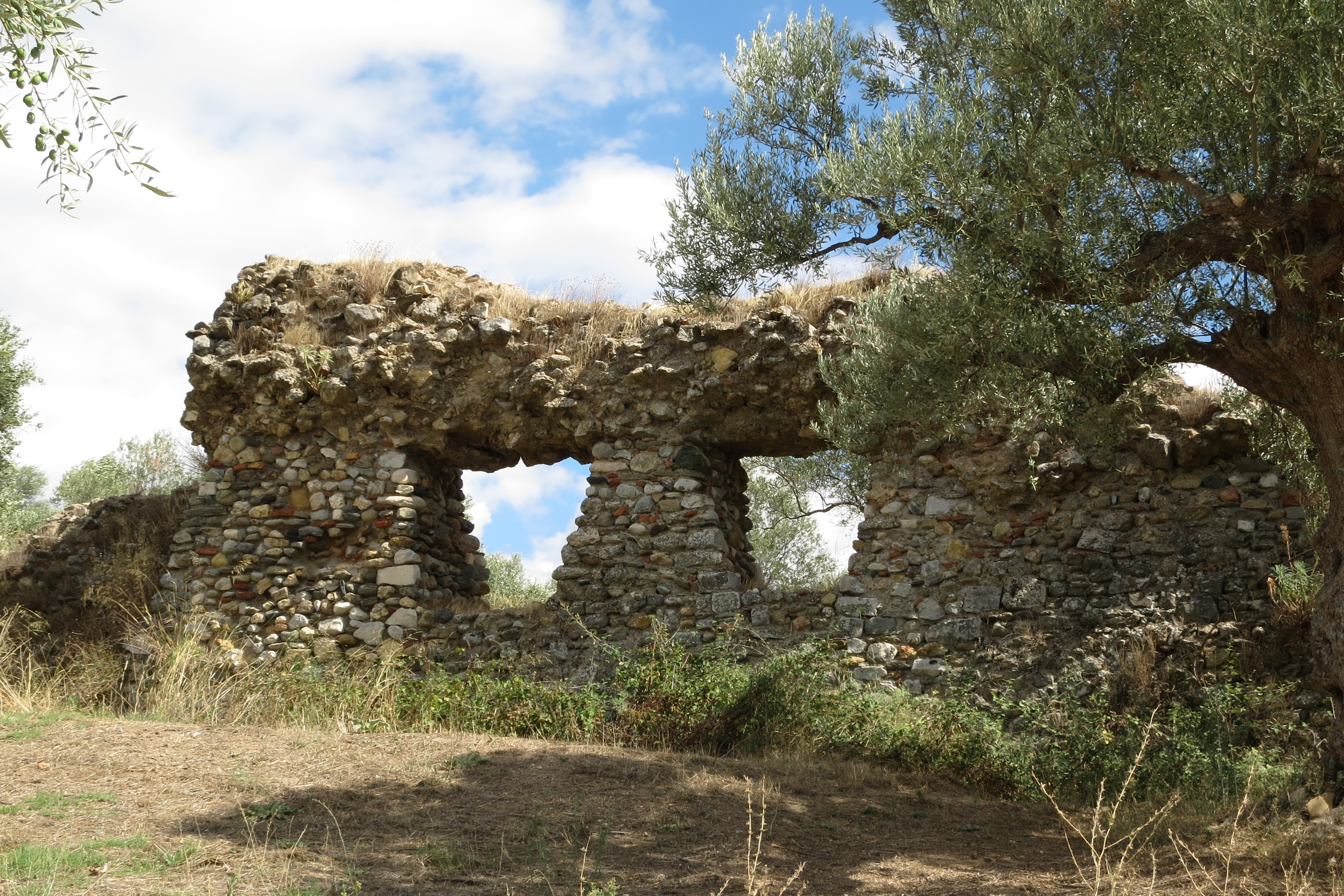
Remaining section of wall that surrounded ancient Sparta

In 1907, the location of the sanctuary of Athena "of the Brazen House" (Χαλκίοικος, Chalkioikos) was determined to be on the acropolis immediately above the theatre. Though the actual temple is almost completely destroyed, the site has produced the longest extant archaic inscription in Laconia, numerous bronze nails and plates, and a considerable number of votive offerings. The city wall, built in successive stages from the 4th to the 2nd century, was traced for a great part of its circuit, which measured 48 stades or nearly 10 km (6 miles) (Polyb. 1X. 21). The late Roman wall enclosing the acropolis, part of which probably dates from the years following the Gothic raid of 262 AD, was also investigated. Besides the actual buildings discovered, a number of points were situated and mapped in a general study of Spartan topography, based upon the description of Pausanias.

In terms of domestic archaeology, little is known about Spartan houses and villages before the Archaic period, but the best evidence comes from excavations at Nichoria in Messenia where postholes have been found. These villages were open and consisted of small and simple houses built with stone foundations and clay walls.

=== Menelaion ===
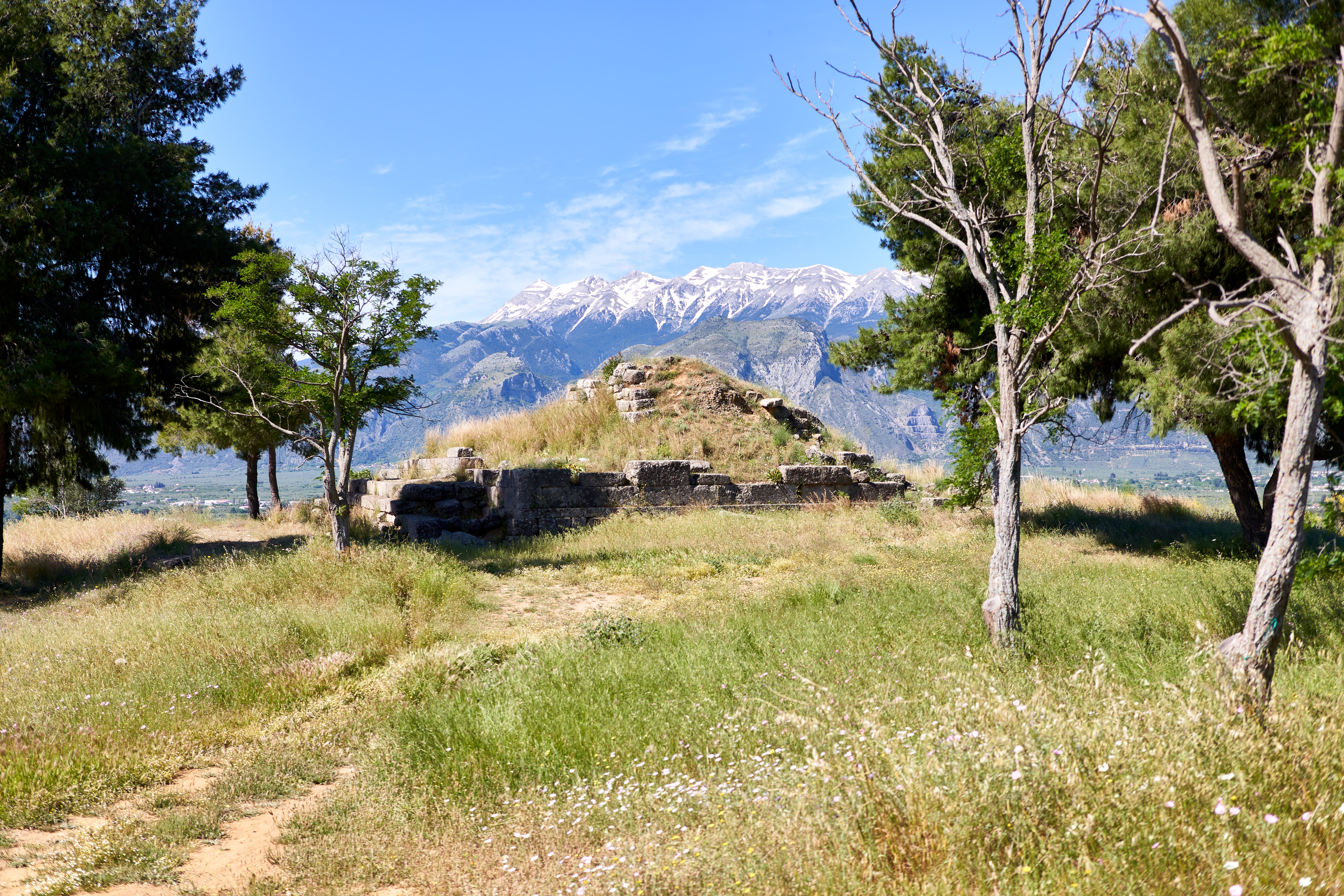
The Menelaion

The Menelaion is a shrine associated with Menelaus, located east of Sparta, by the river Eurotas, on the hill Profitis Ilias (Coordinates: 37.0659°N 22.4536°E). Built around the early 8th century BC, the Spartans believed it had been the former residence of Menelaus. In 1970, the British School in Athens started excavations around the Menelaion in an attempt to locate Mycenaean remains in the area. There are remains of three Mycenaean mansions which were likely destroyed by earthquakes or fire. The offerings dedicated to Helen and Menelaus made during the Classical period were also found at the site.

Excavations made from the early 1990s to the present suggest that the area around the Menelaion in the southern part of the Eurotas valley seems to have been the centre of Mycenaean Laconia. The Mycenaean settlement was roughly triangular in shape, with its apex pointed towards the north. Its area was approximately equal to that of the "newer" Sparta, but denudation has wreaked havoc with its buildings and nothing is left of its original structures save for ruined foundations and broken potsherds.

== History ==
=== Prehistory and "dark age" ===
The prehistory of Sparta is difficult to reconstruct because the literary evidence was written far later than the events it describes and is distorted by oral tradition. The earliest certain evidence of human settlement in the region of Sparta consists of pottery dating from the Middle Neolithic period, found in the vicinity of Kouphovouno some two kilometres (1.2 miles) south-southwest of Sparta.

This civilisation seems to have fallen into decline by the late Bronze Age, when, according to Herodotus, Macedonian tribes from the north (called Dorians by those they conquered) marched into the Peloponnese and, subjugating the local tribes, settled there. The Dorians seem to have set about expanding the frontiers of Spartan territory almost before they had established their own state. They fought against the Argive Dorians to the east and southeast, and also the Arcadian Achaeans to the northwest. The evidence suggests that Sparta, relatively inaccessible because of the topography of the Taygetan plain, was secure from early on: it was never fortified.

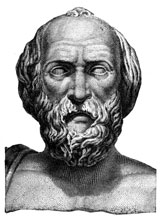
Lycurgus

Nothing distinctive in the archaeology of the Eurotas River Valley identifies the Dorians or the Dorian Spartan state. The prehistory of the Neolithic, the Bronze Age and the Dark Age (the Early Iron Age) at this moment must be treated apart from the stream of Dorian Spartan history.

The legendary period of Spartan history is believed to fall into the Dark Age. It treats the mythic heroes such as the Heraclids and the Perseids, offering a view of the occupation of the Peloponnesus that contains both fantastic and possibly historical elements. The subsequent proto-historic period, combining both legend and historical fragments, offers the first credible history.

=== Archaic Sparta ===
Between the 8th and 7th centuries BC the Spartans experienced a period of lawlessness and civil strife, later attested by both Herodotus and Thucydides. As a result, they carried out a series of political and social reforms of their own society which they later attributed to a semi-mythical lawgiver, Lycurgus. Several writers throughout antiquity, including Herodotus, Xenophon, and Plutarch have attempted to explain Spartan exceptionalism as a result of the so-called Lycurgan Reforms.

In the Second Messenian War, Sparta established itself as a local power in the Peloponnesus and the rest of Greece. During the following centuries, Sparta's reputation as a land-fighting force was unequalled. At its peak around 500 BC, Sparta had some 20,000–35,000 citizens, plus numerous helots and perioikoi. The likely total of 40,000–50,000 made Sparta one of the larger Greek city-states; however, according to Thucydides, the population of Athens in 431 BC was 360,000–610,000, making it much larger. (Note: According to Thucydides, the Athenian citizens at the beginning of the Peloponnesian War (5th century BC) numbered 40,000, making a total of 140,000 people when including their families. The metics, i.e. those who did not have citizen rights and paid for the right to reside in Athens, numbered a further 70,000, while slaves were estimated at between 150,000 and 400,000.)

=== Classical Sparta ===
==== Greco-Persian Wars ====
In 480 BC, a small force led by King Leonidas (about 300 full Spartiates, 700 Thespians, and 400 Thebans, although these numbers were lessened by earlier casualties) made a legendary last stand at the Battle of Thermopylae against the massive Persian army, led by Xerxes. The Spartans received advance warning of the Persian invasion from their deposed king Demaratus, which prompted them to consult the Delphic oracle. According to Herodotus, the Pythia proclaimed that either one of the kings of Sparta had to die or Sparta would be destroyed. This prophecy was fulfilled after king Leonidas died in the battle. The superior weaponry, strategy, and bronze armour of the Greek hoplites and their phalanx fighting formation again proved their worth one year later when Sparta assembled its full strength and led a Greek alliance against the Persians at the Battle of Plataea in 479 BC.

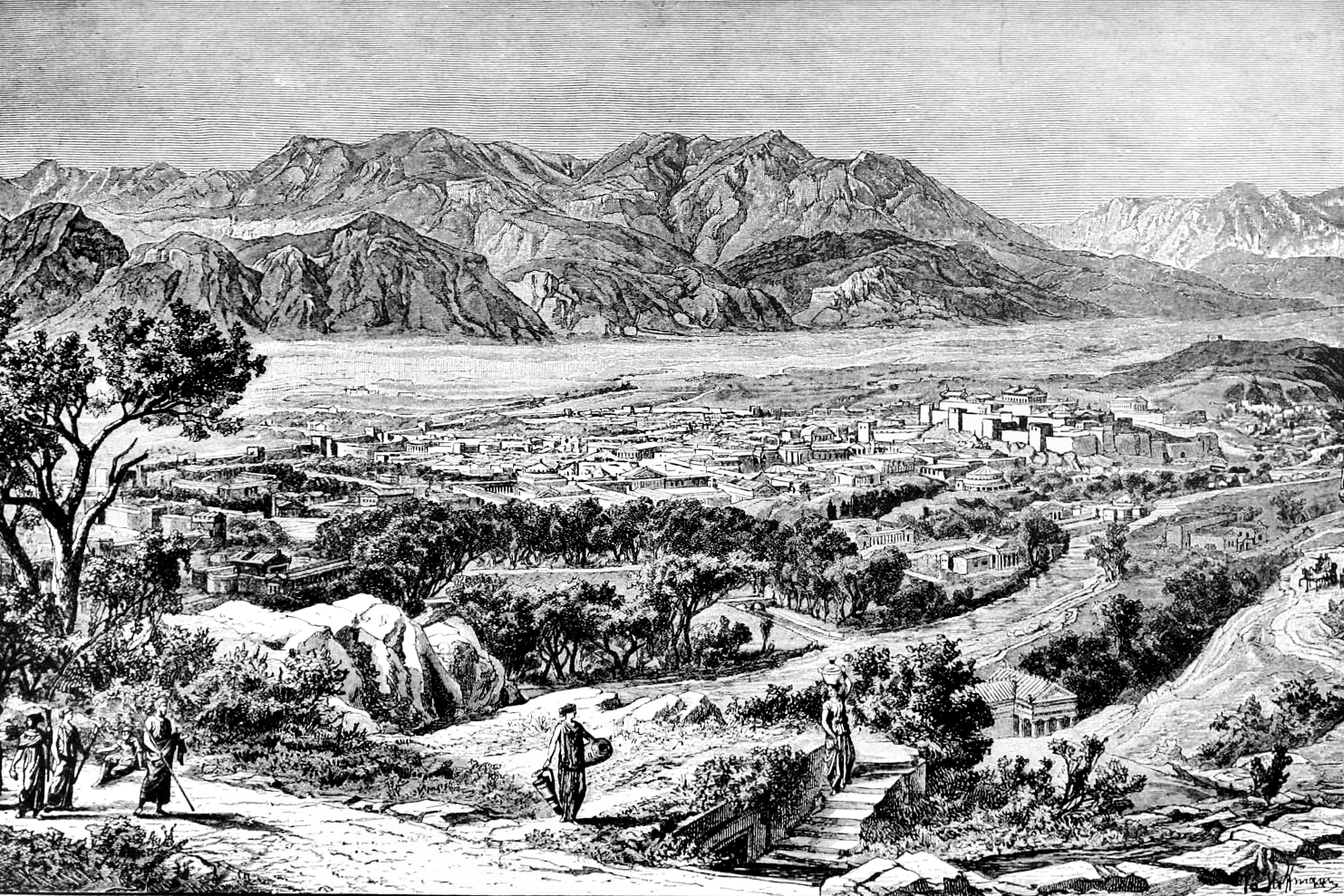
Ancient Sparta.

The decisive Greek victory at Plataea put an end to the Greco-Persian War along with Persian ambitions to expand into Europe. Even though this war was won by a pan-Greek army, credit was given to Sparta, who besides providing the leading forces at Thermopylae and Plataea, had been the leader of the entire Greek expedition.

==== Peloponnesian War and Spartan hegemony ====
In 464 BC, a violent earthquake occurred along the Sparta faultline destroying much of what was Sparta and many other city-states in ancient Greece. This earthquake is marked by scholars as one of the key events that led to the First Peloponnesian War.

In later Classical times, Sparta along with Athens, Thebes, and Persia were the main powers fighting for supremacy in the northeastern Mediterranean. In the course of the Peloponnesian War, Sparta, a traditional land power, acquired a navy which managed to overpower the previously dominant flotilla of Athens, ending the Athenian Empire. At the peak of its power in the early 4th century BC, Sparta had subdued many of the main Greek states and even invaded the Persian provinces in Anatolia (modern day Turkey), a period known as the Spartan hegemony.

During the Corinthian War, Sparta faced a coalition of the leading Greek states: Thebes, Athens, Corinth, and Argos. The alliance was initially backed by Persia, which feared further Spartan expansion into Asia. Sparta achieved a series of land victories, but many of her ships were destroyed at the Battle of Cnidus by a Greek-Phoenician mercenary fleet that Persia had provided to Athens. The event severely damaged Sparta's naval power but did not end its aspirations of invading further into Persia, until Conon the Athenian ravaged the Spartan coastline and provoked the old Spartan fear of a helot revolt.

After a few more years of fighting, in 387 BC the Peace of Antalcidas was established, according to which all Greek cities of Ionia would return to Persian control, and Persia's Asian border would be free of the Spartan threat. The effects of the war were to reaffirm Persia's ability to interfere successfully in Greek politics and to affirm Sparta's weakened hegemonic position in the Greek political system.

==== End of Spartan hegemony ====
Sparta suffered a severe military defeat to Epaminondas of Thebes at the Battle of Leuctra.

As Spartan citizenship was inherited by blood, Sparta increasingly faced a helot population that vastly outnumbered its citizens. The alarming decline of Spartan citizens was commented on by Aristotle.

Sparta never fully recovered from its losses at Leuctra in 371 BC and the subsequent helot revolts.

==== Sparta and the League of Corinth ====
In 338 BC, Philip II invaded and devastated much of Laconia, turning the Spartans out, though he did not seize Sparta itself. Even during its decline, Sparta never forgot its claim to be the "defender of Hellenism" and its Laconic wit. An anecdote has it that when Philip II sent a message to Sparta saying "If I invade Laconia, I shall turn you out.", the Spartans responded with the single, terse reply: αἴκα, "if". When Philip created the League of Corinth on the pretext of unifying Greece against Persia, the Spartans chose not to join, since they had no interest in joining a pan-Greek expedition unless it were under Spartan leadership. Thus, upon defeating the Persians at the Battle of the Granicus, Alexander the Great sent to Athens 300 suits of Persian armour with the following inscription: "Alexander, son of Philip, and all the Greeks except the Spartans, give these offerings taken from the foreigners who live in Asia".

The Spartan king Agis III sent a force to Crete in 333 BC to secure the island for the Persian interest. Agis next took action against Macedon by laying siege to Megalopolis in 331 BC, while Alexander campaigned against the Persians in Asia as leader of the Hellenic league. However, a large Macedonian army under general Antipater marched to its relief and defeated the Spartan-led force in a pitched battle. More than 5,300 of the Spartans and their allies were killed in battle, and 3,500 of Antipater's troops. Agis, now wounded and unable to stand, ordered his men to leave him behind to face the advancing Macedonian army so that he could buy them time to retreat. On his knees, the Spartan king slew several enemy soldiers before being finally killed by a javelin. Alexander was merciful, and he only forced the Spartans to join the League of Corinth, which they had previously refused.

=== Hellenistic Sparta ===
After the Diadochi Wars, Sparta continued to be one of the Peloponesian powers until its eventual loss of independence in 192 BC. In 272 BC Pyrrhus of Epirus failed to besiege Sparta. Cleomenes III allied with the Ptolemaic kingdom and tried to make Sparta the dominant power of the Peloponnese against the Achaean League with initial successes but he was finally defeated in 222 BC at the battle of Sellasia from a Macedonian-Achaean alliance under Antigonus Doson. During the First Macedonian War, Sparta was an ally of the Roman Republic. Spartan political independence was put to an end when it was eventually forced into the Achaean League by Philopoemen, after its defeat in the decisive Laconian War by a coalition of other Greek city-states and Rome, and the resultant overthrow of its final king Nabis, in 192 BC. Sparta played no active part in the Achaean War in 146 BC when the Achaean League was defeated by the Roman general Lucius Mummius.

=== Roman Sparta ===
Subsequently, Sparta became a free city under Roman rule, some of the institutions of Lycurgus were restored, and the city became a tourist attraction for the Roman elite who came to observe exotic Spartan customs. (Note: Especially the Diamastigosis at the Sanctuary of Artemis Orthia, Limnai outside Sparta. There an amphitheatre was built in the 3rd century AD to observe the ritual whipping of Spartan youths. Visiting Romans came to see Sparta as having degraded to a disgusting cult of fetish brutality.)

In 214 AD, Roman emperor Caracalla, in his preparation for his campaign against Parthia, recruited a 500-man Spartan cohort (lokhos). Herodian described this unit as a phalanx, implying it fought like the old Spartans as hoplites, or even as a Macedonian phalanx. Despite this, a gravestone of a fallen legionary named Marcus Aurelius Alexys shows him lightly armed, with a pilos-like cap and a wooden club. The unit was presumably discharged in 217 after Caracalla was assassinated.

An exchange of letters in the deutero-canonical First Book of Maccabees expresses a Jewish claim to kinship with the Spartans:

Areus king of the Lacedemonians to Onias the high priest, greeting: It is found in writing, that the Lacedemonians and Jews are brethren, and that they are of the stock of Abraham: Now therefore, since this is come to our knowledge, ye shall do well to write unto us of your prosperity. We do write back again to you, that your cattle and goods are ours, and ours are yours.

— Authorized King James Version 1 Maccabees 12.20

The letters are reproduced in a variant form by Josephus. Jewish historian Uriel Rappaport notes that the relationship between the Jews and the Spartans expressed in this correspondence has "intrigued many scholars, and various explanations have been suggested for the problems raised ... including the historicity of the Jewish leader and high priest Jonathan's letter to the Spartans, the authenticity of the letter of Arius to Onias, cited in Jonathan's letter, and the supposed 'brotherhood' of the Jews and the Spartans." Rappaport is clear that "the authenticity of [the reply] letter of Arius is based on even less firm foundations than the letter of Jonathan".

Spartans long spurned the idea of building a defensive wall around their city, believing they made the city's men soft in terms of their warrior abilities. A wall was finally erected after 184 BC, after the peak of the city-state's power had come and gone.

=== Post-classical and modern Sparta ===
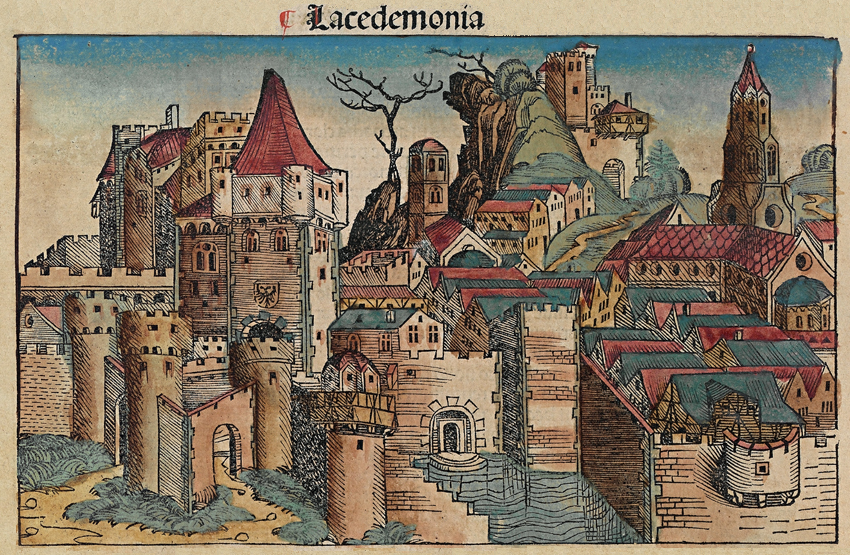
Medieval depiction of Sparta from the Nuremberg Chronicle (1493)

In 396 AD, Sparta was sacked by Visigoths under Alaric I. According to Byzantine sources, some parts of the Laconian region remained pagan until well into the 10th century. The Tsakonian language still spoken in Tsakonia is the only surviving descendant of the ancient Doric language. In the Middle Ages, the political and cultural centre of Laconia shifted to the nearby settlement of Mystras, and Sparta fell further in even local importance. Modern Sparta was re-founded in 1834, by a decree of King Otto of Greece. Today it is a provincial town and the capital of the Laconia administrative region in Greece.

== Structure of Classical Spartan society ==
=== Constitution ===
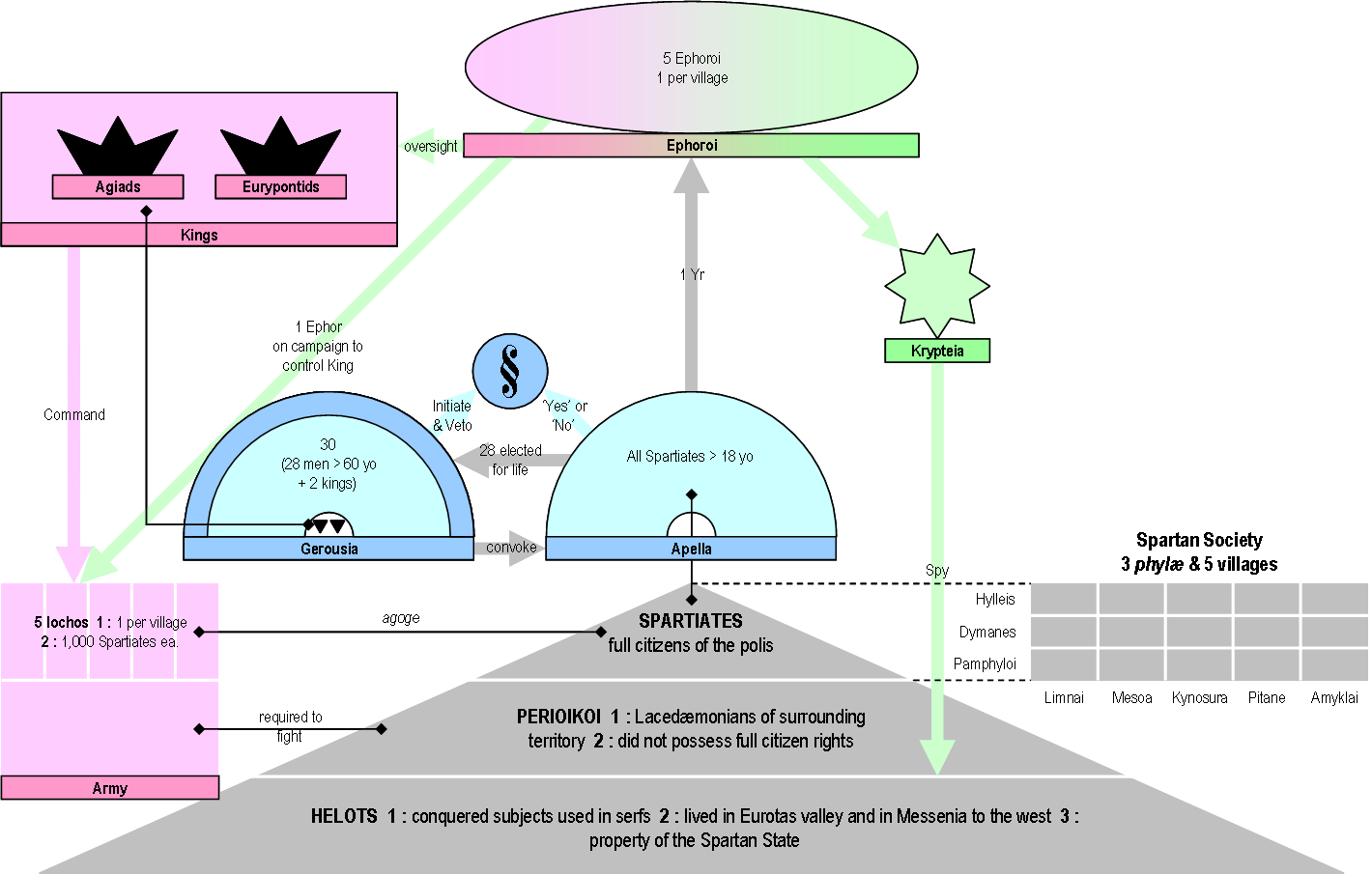
Structure of the Spartan Constitution

Sparta was an oligarchy. The state was ruled by two hereditary kings of the Agiad and Eurypontid families, both supposedly descendants of Heracles and equal in authority, so that one could not act against the power and political enactments of his colleague.

The duties of the kings were primarily religious, judicial, and martial. As chief priests of the state, they maintained communication with the Delphian sanctuary, whose pronouncements exercised great authority in Spartan politics. In the time of Herodotus c. 450 BC, their judicial functions had been restricted to cases dealing with heiresses (epikleroi), adoptions and the public roads (the meaning of the last term is unclear in Herodotus's text and has been interpreted in a number of ways). Aristotle describes the kingship at Sparta as "a kind of unlimited and perpetual generalship" (Pol. iii. 1285a), while Isocrates refers to the Spartans as "subject to an oligarchy at home, to a kingship on campaign" (iii. 24).

Civil and criminal cases were decided by a group of officials known as the ephors, as well as a council of elders known as the Gerousia. The Gerousia consisted of 28 elders over the age of 60, elected for life and usually part of the royal households, and the two kings. High state decisions were discussed by this council, who could then propose policies to the damos, the collective body of Spartan citizenry, who would select one of the alternatives by vote.

Royal prerogatives were curtailed over time. From the period of the Persian wars, the king lost the right to declare war and was accompanied in the field by two ephors. He was supplanted by the ephors also in the control of foreign policy. Over time, the kings became mere figureheads except in their capacity as generals. Political power was transferred to the ephors and Gerousia.

An assembly of citizens called the Ekklesia was responsible for electing men to the Gerousia for life.

=== Citizenship ===
The Spartan education process known as the agoge was essential for full citizenship. However, usually the only boys eligible for the agoge were Spartiates, those who could trace their ancestry to the original inhabitants of the city.

There were two exceptions. Trophimoi or "foster sons" were foreign students invited to study. The Athenian general Xenophon, for example, sent his two sons to Sparta as trophimoi. Also, the son of a helot could be enrolled as a syntrophos if a Spartiate formally adopted him and paid his way; if he did exceptionally well in training, he might be sponsored to become a Spartiate. Spartans who could not afford to pay the expenses of the agoge could lose their citizenship.

These laws meant that Sparta could not readily replace citizens lost in battle or otherwise, which eventually proved near fatal as citizens became greatly outnumbered by non-citizens, and even more dangerously by helots.

=== Non citizens ===
The other classes were the perioikoi, free inhabitants who were non-citizens, and the helots, state-owned serfs. Descendants of non-Spartan citizens were forbidden the agoge.

==== Helots ====
The Spartans were a minority of the Lakonian population. The largest class of inhabitants were the helots (in Classical Greek Εἵλωτες / Heílôtes).

The helots were originally free Greeks from the areas of Messenia and Lakonia whom the Spartans had defeated in battle and subsequently enslaved. The helots' position has been described as "serf-like" and they were treated harshly by their masters. The Spartan helots were not only agricultural workers, but were also household servants, both male and female would be assigned domestic duties, such as wool-working. However, the helots were not the private property of individual Spartan citizens, regardless of their household duties, and were instead owned by the state through the kleros system.

Helots did not have voting or political rights. The Spartan poet Tyrtaios refers to Helots being allowed to marry and retaining 50% of the fruits of their labour. They also seem to have been allowed to practice religious rites and, according to Thucydides, own a limited amount of personal property. Initially, helots couldn't be freed but during the middle Hellenistic period, some 6,000 helots accumulated enough wealth to buy their freedom, for example, in 227 BC.

In other Greek city-states, free citizens were part-time soldiers who, when not at war, carried on other trades. Since Spartan men were full-time soldiers, they were not available to carry out manual labour. The helots were used as unskilled serfs, tilling Spartan land. Helot women were often used as wet nurses. Helots also travelled with the Spartan army as non-combatant serfs. At the last stand of the Battle of Thermopylae, the Greek dead included not just the legendary three hundred Spartan soldiers but also several hundred Thespian and Theban troops and a number of helots.

There was at least one helot revolt (c. 465–460 BC) that led to prolonged conflict. By the tenth year of this war the Spartans and Messenians had reached an agreement in which Messenian rebels were allowed to leave the Peloponnese. They were given safe passage under the terms that they would be re-enslaved if they tried to return. This agreement ended the most serious incursion into Spartan territory since their expansion in the seventh and eighth centuries BC. Thucydides remarked that "Spartan policy is always mainly governed by the necessity of taking precautions against the helots." On the other hand, the Spartans trusted their helots enough in 479 BC to take a force of 35,000 with them to Plataea, something they could not have risked if they feared the helots would attack them or run away. Slave revolts occurred elsewhere in the Greek world, and in 413 BC 20,000 Athenian slaves ran away to join the Spartan forces occupying Attica. The homogeneous population of Messenian helots who could form families, kept kinship ties and owned some personal items posed a constant threat of rebellion.

As the Spartiate population declined and the helot population continued to grow, the imbalance of power caused increasing tension. According to Myron of Priene of the middle 3rd century BC:

They assign to the Helots every shameful task leading to disgrace. For they ordained that each one of them must wear a dogskin cap (κυνῆ / kunễ) and wrap himself in skins (διφθέρα / diphthéra) and receive a stipulated number of beatings every year regardless of any wrongdoing, so that they would never forget they were slaves. Moreover, if any exceeded the vigour proper to a slave's condition, they made death the penalty; and they allotted a punishment to those controlling them if they failed to rebuke those who were growing fat.

Plutarch also states that Spartans treated the helots "harshly and cruelly": they compelled them to drink pure wine (which was considered dangerous – wine usually being cut with water) "...and to lead them in that condition into their public halls, that the children might see what a sight a drunken man is; they made them to dance low dances, and sing ridiculous songs..." during syssitia (obligatory banquets).

Each year when the Ephors took office, they ritually declared war on the helots, allowing Spartans to kill them without risk of ritual pollution. This fight seems to have been carried out by kryptai (sing. κρύπτης kryptēs), graduates of the agoge who took part in the mysterious institution known as the Krypteia. Thucydides states:

The helots were invited by a proclamation to pick out those of their number who claimed to have most distinguished themselves against the enemy, in order that they might receive their freedom; the object being to test them, as it was thought that the first to claim their freedom would be the most high spirited and the most apt to rebel. As many as two thousand were selected accordingly, who crowned themselves and went round the temples, rejoicing in their new freedom. The Spartans, however, soon afterwards did away with them, and no one ever knew how each of them perished.

==== Perioikoi ====
The Perioikoi came from similar origins as the helots but occupied a significantly different position in Spartan society. Although they did not enjoy full citizen-rights, they were free and not subjected to the same restrictions as the helots. The exact nature of their subjection to the Spartans is not clear, but they seem to have served partly as a kind of military reserve, partly as skilled craftsmen and partly as agents of foreign trade. Perioikoic hoplites served increasingly with the Spartan army, explicitly at the Battle of Plataea, and although they may also have fulfilled functions such as the manufacture and repair of armour and weapons, they were increasingly integrated into the combat units of the Spartan army as the Spartiate population declined.

=== Economy ===
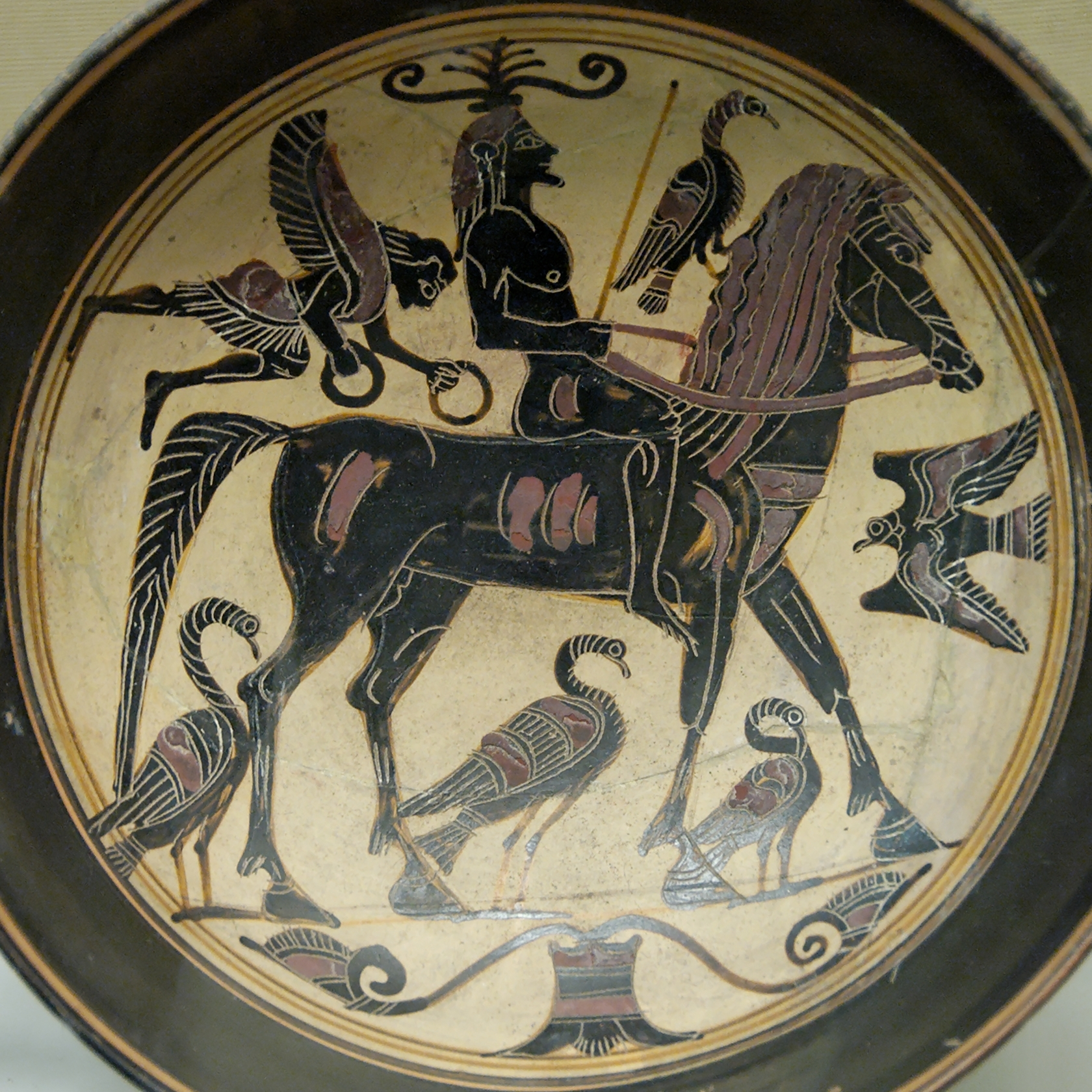
Name vase of the Spartan artist known as the Rider Painter (Laconian black-figured kylix, c. 550–530 BC)

Full citizen Spartiates were barred by law from trade or manufacture, which consequently rested in the hands of the Perioikoi. This lucrative monopoly, in a fertile territory with a good harbours, ensured the loyalty of the perioikoi. Despite the prohibition on menial labour or trade, there is evidence of Spartan sculptors, and Spartans were certainly poets, magistrates, ambassadors, and governors as well as soldiers.

Allegedly, Spartans were prohibited from possessing gold and silver coins, and according to legend Spartan currency consisted of iron bars to discourage hoarding. Though the conspicuous display of wealth appears to have been discouraged, this did not preclude the production of very fine decorated bronze, ivory and wooden works of art as well as exquisite jewellery, attested in archaeology.

Allegedly as part of the Lycurgan Reforms in the mid-8th century BC, a massive land reform had divided property into 9,000 equal portions. Each citizen received one estate, a kleros, which was expected to provide his living. The land was worked by helots who retained half the yield. From the other half, the Spartiate was expected to pay his mess (syssitia) fees, and the agoge fees for his children. However, nothing is known of matters of wealth such as how land was bought, sold, and inherited, or whether daughters received dowries. However, from early on there were marked differences of wealth within the state, and these became more serious after the law of Epitadeus some time after the Peloponnesian War, which removed the legal prohibition on the gift or bequest of land. By the mid-5th century, land had become concentrated in the hands of a tiny elite, and the notion that all Spartan citizens were equals had become an empty pretence. By Aristotle's day (384–322 BC) citizenship had been reduced from 9,000 to less than 1,000, then further decreased to 700 at the accession of Agis IV in 244 BC. Attempts were made to remedy this by imposing legal penalties upon bachelors, but this could not reverse the trend.

== Life in Classical Sparta ==
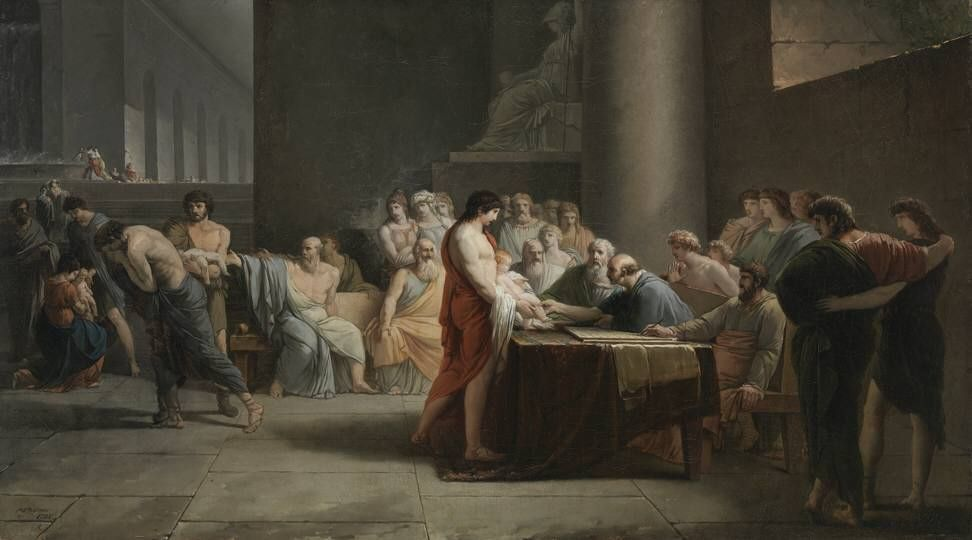
Jean-Pierre Saint-Ours, The Selection of Children in Sparta, 1785. A Neoclassical imaging of what Plutarch describes.

=== Birth and death ===
Sparta was above all a militarist state, and emphasis on military fitness began virtually at birth. According to Plutarch, after birth, a mother would bathe her child in wine to see whether the child was strong. If the child survived, it was brought before the Gerousia by the child's father. The Gerousia then decided whether it was to be reared or not. It is commonly stated that if they considered it "puny and deformed", the baby was thrown into a chasm on Mount Taygetos known euphemistically as the Apothetae (Gr., ἀποθέται, "Deposits"). This would, in effect, be a primitive form of eugenics. Plutarch is the sole historical source for the Spartan practice of systemic infanticide motivated by eugenics. Sparta is often viewed as being unique in this regard, however, anthropologist Laila Williamson notes: "Infanticide has been practiced on every continent and by people on every level of cultural complexity, from hunter gatherers to high civilisations. Rather than being an exception, then, it has been the rule." There is controversy about the matter in Sparta, since excavations in the chasm uncovered only adult remains, likely belonging to criminals and Greek sources contemporary to Sparta do not mention systemic infanticide motivated solely by eugenics.

Spartan burial customs changed over time. The Archaic Spartan poet Tyrtaeus spoke of the Spartan war-dead as follows:

Never do his [the war-dead's] name and good fame perish,
But even though he is beneath the earth he is immortal,
Young and old alike mourn him,
All the city is distressed by the painful loss,
and his tomb and children are pointed out among the people,
and his children's children and his line after them.

When Spartans died, marked headstones would only be granted to soldiers who died in combat during a victorious campaign or women who died either in service of a divine office or in childbirth. These headstones likely acted as memorials, rather than as grave markers. Evidence of Spartan burials is provided by the Tomb of the Lacedaimonians in Athens. Excavations at the cemetery of classical Sparta, uncovered ritually pierced kantharoid-like ceramic vessels, the ritual slaughter of horses, and specific burial enclosures alongside individual 'plots'. Some of the graves were reused over time.

In the Hellenistic Period, grander, two-storey monumental tombs are found at Sparta. Ten of these have been found for this period.

=== Education ===
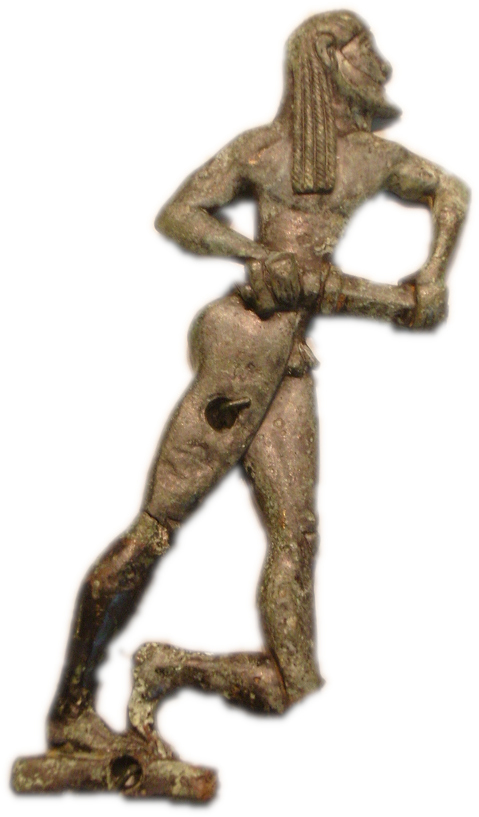
Bronze appliqué of Spartan manufacture, possibly depicting Orestes, 550–525 BC (Getty Villa)

When male Spartans began military training at age seven, they would enter the agoge system. The agoge was designed to encourage discipline and physical toughness and to emphasise the importance of the Spartan state. Boys lived in communal messes and, according to Xenophon, whose sons attended the agoge, the boys were fed "just the right amount for them never to become sluggish through being too full, while also giving them a taste of what it is not to have enough." In addition, they were trained to survive in times of privation, even if it meant stealing. Besides physical and weapons training, boys studied reading, writing, music and dancing. Special punishments were imposed if boys failed to answer questions sufficiently "laconically" (i.e. briefly and wittily).

Spartan boys were expected to take an older male mentor, usually an unmarried young man. According to some sources, the older man was expected to function as a kind of substitute father and role model to his junior partner; however, others believe it was reasonably certain that they had sexual relations (the exact nature of Spartan pederasty is not entirely clear). Xenophon, an admirer of the Spartan educational system whose sons attended the agoge, explicitly denies the sexual nature of the relationship.

Some Spartan youth apparently became members of an irregular unit known as the Krypteia. The immediate objective of this unit was to seek out and kill vulnerable helot Laconians as part of the larger program of terrorising and intimidating the helot population.

Less information is available about the education of Spartan girls, but they seem to have gone through a fairly extensive formal educational cycle, broadly similar to that of the boys but with less emphasis on military training. Spartan girls received an education known as mousikē. This included music, dancing, singing and poetry. Choral dancing was taught so Spartan girls could participate in ritual activities, including the cults of Helen and Artemis. In this respect, classical Sparta was unique in ancient Greece. In no other city-state did women receive any kind of formal education.

=== Military life ===
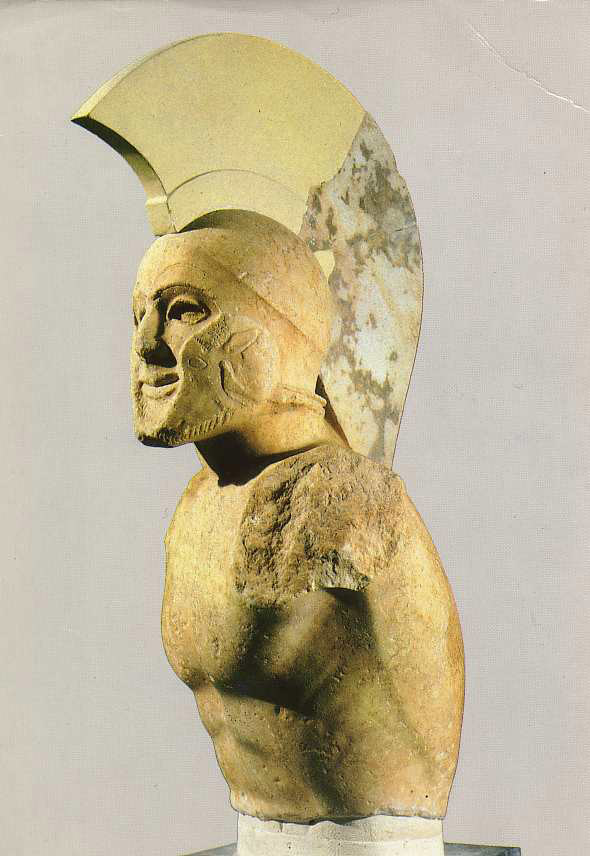
The so-called Leonidas sculpture (5th century BC), Archaeological Museum of Sparta, Greece

At age 20, the Spartan citizen began his membership in one of the syssitia (dining messes or clubs), composed of about fifteen members each, of which every citizen was required to be a member. Here each group learned how to bond and rely on one another. The Spartans were not eligible for election for public office until the age of 30. Only native Spartans were considered full citizens and were obliged to undergo the training as prescribed by law, as well as participate in and contribute financially to one of the syssitia.

Sparta is thought to be the first city to practice athletic nudity, and some scholars claim that it was also the first to formalize pederasty. According to these sources, the Spartans believed that the love of an older, accomplished aristocrat for an adolescent was essential to his formation as a free citizen. The agoge, the education of the ruling class, was, they claim, founded on pederastic relationships required of each citizen, with the lover responsible for the boy's training.

However, other scholars question this interpretation. Xenophon explicitly denies it, but not Plutarch.

Spartan men remained in the active reserve until age 60. Men were encouraged to marry at age 20 but could not live with their families until they left their active military service at age 30. They called themselves "homoioi" (equals), pointing to their common lifestyle and the discipline of the phalanx, which demanded that no soldier be superior to his comrades. Insofar as hoplite warfare could be perfected, the Spartans did so.

Thucydides reports that when a Spartan man went to war, his wife (or another woman of some significance) would customarily present him with his aspis (shield) and say: "With this, or upon this" (Ἢ τὰν ἢ ἐπὶ τᾶς, Èi tàn èi èpì tàs), meaning that true Spartans could only return to Sparta either victorious (with their shield in hand) or dead (carried upon it). This is almost certainly propaganda. Spartans buried their battle dead on or near the battle field; corpses were not brought back on their shield. Nevertheless, it is fair to say that it was less of a disgrace for a soldier to lose his helmet, breastplate or greaves than his shield, since the former were designed to protect one man, whereas the shield also protected the man on his left. Thus, the shield was symbolic of the individual soldier's subordination to his unit, his integral part in its success, and his solemn responsibility to his comrades in arms – messmates and friends, often close blood relations.

Aristotle wrote on the Spartan customs

It is the standards of civilized men not of beasts that must be kept in mind, for it is good men not beasts who are capable of real courage. Those like the Spartans who concentrate on the one and ignore the other in their education turn men into machines and in devoting themselves to one single aspect of city's life, end up making them inferior even in that.

One of the most persistent myths about Sparta is the notion that Spartan mothers were without feelings toward their off-spring and helped enforce a militaristic lifestyle on their sons and husbands. The myth can be traced back to Plutarch, who includes no less than 17 "sayings" of "Spartan women", all of which paraphrase or elaborate on the theme that Spartan mothers rejected their own offspring if they showed any kind of cowardice. In some of these sayings, mothers revile their sons in insulting language merely for surviving a battle. These sayings purporting to be from Spartan women were far more likely to be of Athenian origin and designed to portray Spartan women as unnatural and so undeserving of pity.

=== Agriculture, food, and diet ===
Sparta's agriculture consisted mainly of barley, wine, cheese, grain, and figs. These items were grown locally on each Spartan citizen's kleros and were tended to by helots. Spartan citizens were required to donate a certain amount of what they yielded from their kleros to their syssitia, or mess. These donations to the syssitia were a requirement for every Spartan citizen. All the donated food was then redistributed to feed the Spartan population of that syssitia. The helots who tended to the lands were fed using a portion of what they harvested.

=== Marriage ===
Plutarch reports the peculiar customs associated with the Spartan wedding night:

The custom was to capture women for marriage... The so-called 'bridesmaid' took charge of the captured girl. She first shaved her head to the scalp, then dressed her in a man's cloak and sandals, and laid her down alone on a mattress in the dark. The bridegroom – who was not drunk and thus not impotent, but was sober as always – first had dinner in the messes, then would slip in, undo her belt, lift her and carry her to the bed.

The husband continued to visit his wife in secret for some time after the marriage. These customs, unique to the Spartans, have been interpreted in various ways. One of them decidedly supports the need to disguise the bride as a man in order to help the bridegroom consummate the marriage, so unaccustomed were men to women's looks at the time of their first intercourse. The "abduction" may have served to ward off the evil eye, and the cutting of the wife's hair was perhaps part of a rite of passage that signalled her entrance into a new life.

== Role of women ==
=== Political, social, and economic equality ===
Spartan women, of the citizenry class, enjoyed a status, power, and respect that was unknown in the rest of the classical world. The higher status of females in Spartan society started at birth; unlike Athens, Spartan girls were fed the same food as their brothers. Nor were they confined to their father's house and prevented from exercising or getting fresh air as in Athens, but exercised and even competed in sports. Most important, rather than being married off at the age of 12 or 13, Spartan law forbade the marriage of a girl until she was in her late teens or early 20s. The reasons for delaying marriage were to ensure the birth of healthy children, but the effect was to spare Spartan women the hazards and lasting health damage associated with pregnancy among adolescents. Spartan women, better fed from childhood and fit from exercise, stood a far better chance of reaching old age than women in other Greek cities, where the median age for death was 34.6 years or roughly 10 years below that of men.

Unlike Athenian women who wore heavy, concealing clothes and were rarely seen outside the house, Spartan women wore dresses (peplos) slit up the side to allow freer movement and moved freely about the city, either walking or driving chariots. Girls as well as boys exercised, possibly in the nude, and young women as well as young men may have participated in the Gymnopaedia ("Festival of Nude Youths").

Another practice that was mentioned by many visitors to Sparta was the practice of "wife-sharing". In accordance with the Spartan belief that breeding should be between the most physically fit parents, many older men allowed younger, more fit men, to impregnate their wives. Other unmarried or childless men might even request another man's wife to bear his children if she had previously been a strong child bearer. For this reason many considered Spartan women polygamous or polyandrous. This practice was encouraged in order that women bear as many strong-bodied children as they could. The Spartan population was hard to maintain due to the constant absence and loss of the men in battle and the intense physical inspection of newborns.

Spartan women were also literate and numerate, a rarity in the ancient world. Furthermore, as a result of their education and the fact that they moved freely in society engaging with their fellow (male) citizens, they were notorious for speaking their minds even in public. Plato, in the middle of the fourth century, described women's curriculum in Sparta as consisting of gymnastics and mousike (music and arts). Plato praised Spartan women's ability when it came to philosophical discussion.

Most importantly, Spartan women had economic power because they controlled their own properties, and those of their husbands. It is estimated that in later Classical Sparta, when the male population was in serious decline, women were the sole owners of at least 35% of all land and property in Sparta. The laws regarding a divorce were the same for both men and women. Unlike women in Athens, if a Spartan woman became the heiress of her father because she had no living brothers to inherit (an epikleros), the woman was not required to divorce her current spouse in order to marry her nearest paternal relative.

=== Historic women ===
Many women played a significant role in the history of Sparta. Gorgo, daughter of Cleomenes I and the wife of Leonidas I, was an influential and well-documented figure. Herodotus records that as a small girl she advised her father to resist a bribe. She was later said to be responsible for decoding a warning that the Persian forces were about to invade Greece; after Spartan generals could not decode a wooden tablet covered in wax, she ordered them to clear the wax, revealing the warning. Plutarch's Moralia contains a collection of "Sayings of Spartan Women", including a laconic quip attributed to Gorgo: when asked by a woman from Attica why Spartan women were the only women in the world who could rule men, she replied "Because we are the only women who are mothers of men". In 396, Cynisca, sister of the Eurypontid king Agesilaus II, became the first woman in Greece to win an Olympic chariot race. She won again in 392, and dedicated two monuments to commemorate her victory, these being an inscription in Sparta and a set of bronze equestrian statues at the Olympic temple of Zeus.

== Laconophilia ==
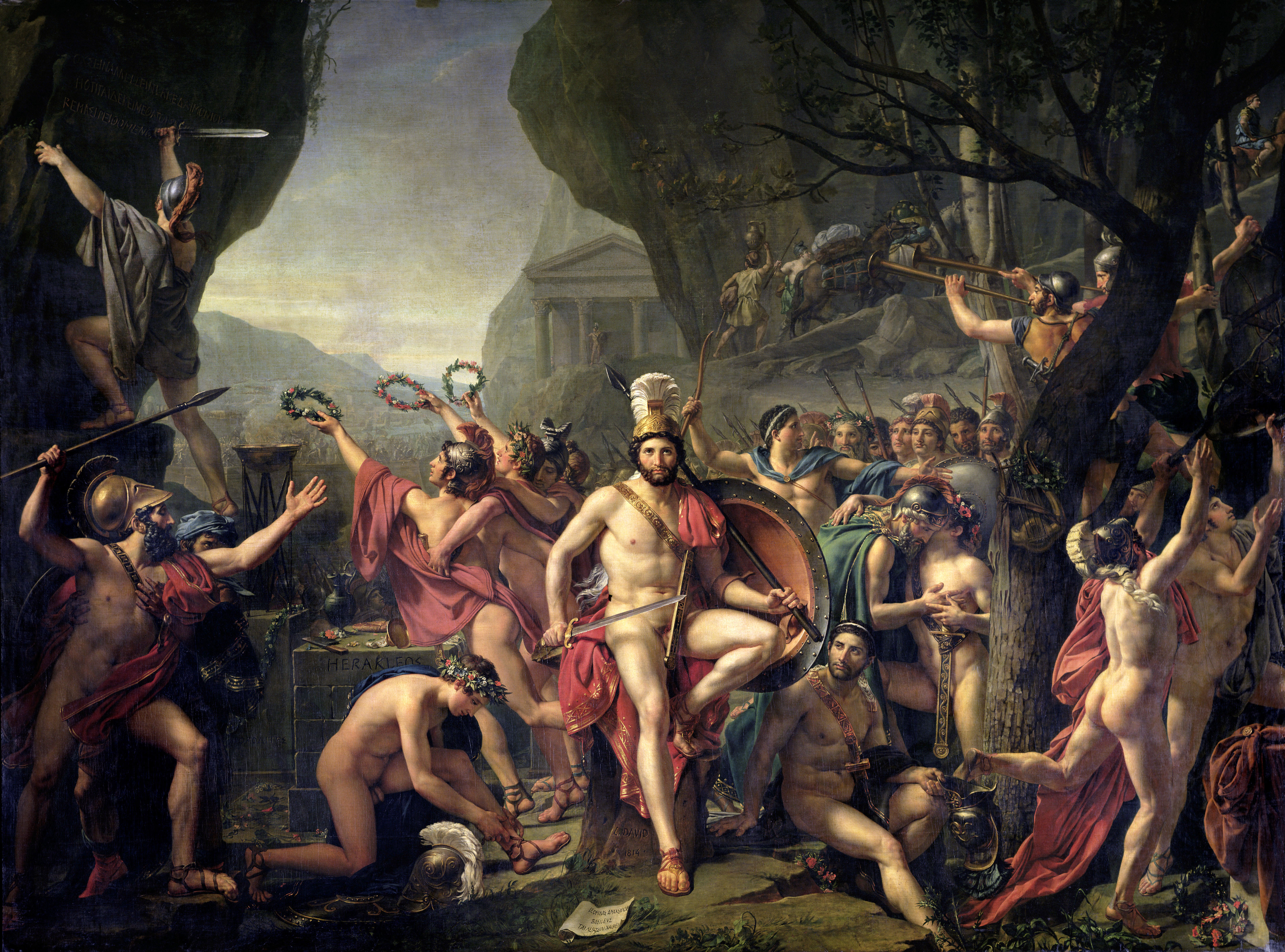
Leonidas at Thermopylae, 1814 painting by Jacques-Louis David

Laconophilia is love or admiration of Sparta and its culture or constitution. Sparta was subject of considerable admiration in its day, even in rival Athens. In ancient times "Many of the noblest and best of the Athenians always considered the Spartan state nearly as an ideal theory realised in practice." Many Greek philosophers, especially Platonists, would often describe Sparta as an ideal state, strong, brave, and free from the corruptions of commerce and money. The French classicist François Ollier in his 1933 book Le mirage spartiate (The Spartan Mirage) warned that a major scholarly problem is that all surviving accounts of Sparta were by non-Spartans who often excessively idealised their subject. The term "Spartan Mirage" has come to refer to "idealized distortions and inventions regarding the character of Spartan society in the works of non-Spartan writers," beginning in Greek and Roman antiquity and continuing through the medieval and modern eras. These accounts of Sparta are typically associated with the social or political concerns of the writer. No accounts survive by the Spartans themselves, if such were ever written.

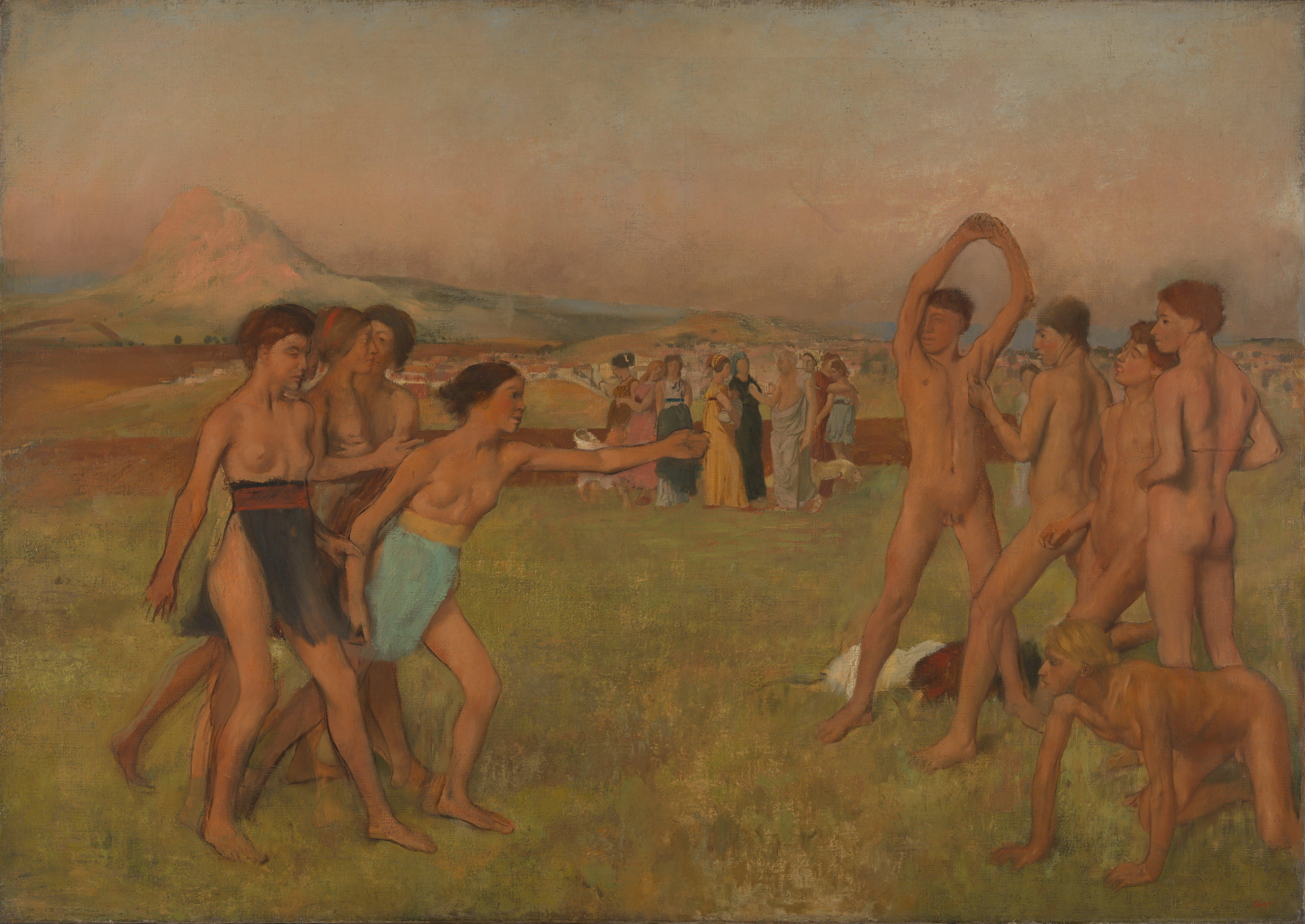
Young Spartans Exercising by Edgar Degas (1834–1917)

With the revival of classical learning in Renaissance Europe, Laconophilia re-appeared, for example in the writings of Machiavelli. The Elizabethan English constitutionalist John Aylmer compared the mixed government of Tudor England to the Spartan republic, stating that "Lacedemonia [was] the noblest and best city governed that ever was". He commended it as a model for England. The philosopher Jean-Jacques Rousseau contrasted Sparta favourably with Athens in his Discourse on the Arts and Sciences, arguing that its austere constitution was preferable to the more sophisticated Athenian life. Sparta was also used as a model of austere purity by Revolutionary and Napoleonic France.

A German strain of Laconophilia was initiated by Karl Otfried Müller, who linked Spartan ideals to the supposed racial superiority of the Dorians, the ethnic sub-group of the Greeks to which the Spartans belonged. In the 20th century, this developed into admiration of Spartan ideals by the National Socialists. Adolf Hitler praised the Spartans, recommending in 1928 that Germany should imitate them by limiting "the number allowed to live". He added that "The Spartans were once capable of such a wise measure... The subjugation of 350,000 Helots by 6,000 Spartans was only possible because of the racial superiority of the Spartans." The Spartans had created "the first racialist state". Following the invasion of the USSR, Hitler viewed citizens of the USSR as like the helots under the Spartans: "They [the Spartans] came as conquerors, and they took everything", and so should the Germans. A Nazi officer specified that "the Germans would have to assume the position of the Spartiates, while... the Russians were the Helots."

Certain early Zionists, and particularly the founders of Kibbutz movement in Israel, were influenced by Spartan ideals, particularly in education. Tabenkin, a founding father of the Kibbutz movement and the Palmach strikeforce, prescribed that education for warfare "should begin from the nursery", that children should from kindergarten be taken to "spend nights in the mountains and valleys".

In modern times, the adjective "Spartan" means simple, frugal, avoiding luxury and comfort. The term "laconic phrase" describes the very terse and direct speech characteristic of the Spartans.

Sparta also features prominently in modern popular culture, most famously the Battle of Thermopylae (see Battle of Thermopylae in popular culture).

== Notable ancient Spartans ==
- Agesilaus II – king
- Agis I – king
- Agis II – king
- Agis III – king
- Archidamus II – king
- Archidamus III – king
- Areus I – king
- Brasidas – general
- Chilon – philosopher
- Chionis (7th century BC) – athlete
- Cleomenes I – king
- Cleomenes III – king and reformer
- Cleombrotus I – king
- Clearchus of Sparta – general of the Ten Thousand
- Cheirisophus (general) – general of the Ten Thousand
- Cleonymus of Sparta – member of royal Spartan family
- Cynisca (4th century BC) – princess and athlete
- Dercylidas – general
- Diphridas – general
- Gorgo – queen and politician
- Gylippus – general
- Helen – princess in the Trojan War
- Leonidas I (c. 520–480 BC) – king, commander at the Battle of Thermopylae
- Lycurgus (quasi-mythical, century unclear) — lawgiver
- Lycurgus (king of Sparta) (3rd century BC) — abolished the diarchy
- Lysander (5th–4th century BC) – general
- Menelaus – king during the Trojan War
- Nicomedes of Sparta – general
- Nabis – king
- Pausanias the Regent – general
- Thibron (harmost) – general
- Xanthippus of Carthage – Spartan mercenary general that defeated the Romans in battle in the First Punic War

== See also ==
- Molon labe
- List of ancient Greek cities
- Peloponnesian League
- Delian League
- Mystras
- Tsakonia
- Mani Peninsula
- Doric Greek
- League of Corinth

== Sources ==
- Davies, Norman (1997) [1996]. Europe: A History. Random House. ISBN 0712666338.
- Adcock, F. E. (1957), The Greek and Macedonian Art of War, Berkeley: University of California Press, ISBN 0-520-00005-6
- Autenrieth, Georg (1891). A Homeric Dictionary for Schools and Colleges. New York: Harper and Brothers.
- Blundell, Sue (1999). Women in Ancient Greece. London: British Museum Press. ISBN 978-0-7141-2219-9.
- Cartledge, Paul (2002), Sparta and Lakonia: A Regional History 1300 to 362 BC (2nd ed.), Oxford: Routledge, ISBN 0-415-26276-3
- Cartledge, Paul (2001), Spartan Reflections, London: Duckworth, ISBN 0-7156-2966-2
- Cartledge, Paul; Spawforth, Antony (2001), Hellenistic and Roman Sparta (2nd ed.), Oxford: Routledge, ISBN 0-415-26277-1
- Ehrenberg, Victor (2002) [1973], From Solon to Socrates: Greek History and Civilisation between the 6th and 5th centuries BC (2nd ed.), London: Routledge, ISBN 978-0-415-04024-2
- Forrest, W. G. (1968), A History of Sparta, 950–192 B.C., New York: W. W. Norton & Co.
- Green, Peter (1998), The Greco-Persian Wars (2nd ed.), Berkeley: University of California Press, ISBN 0-520-20313-5
- Liddell, Henry George; Scott, Robert (1940). Jones, Henry Stuart (ed.). A Greek-English Lexicon. Oxford: Clarendon Press.
- Pomeroy, Sarah B. (2002), Spartan Women, Oxford: Oxford University Press, ISBN 978-0-19-513067-6
- Powell, Anton (2001), Athens and Sparta: Constructing Greek Political and Social History from 478 BC (2nd ed.), London: Routledge, ISBN 0-415-26280-1
- Pausanias (1918). Description of Greece. with an English Translation by W.H.S. Jones, Litt.D., and H.A. Ormerod, M.A., in 4 Volumes. ISBN 9780674992078.
- Plutarch (1874), Plutarch's Morals, Translated from the Greek by several hands. Corrected and revised by. William W. Goodwin, PH. D., Boston, Cambridge
- Plutarch (1891), Bernardakis, Gregorius N. (ed.), Moralia, Plutarch (in Greek), Leipzig: Teubner
- Plutarch (2005), Richard J.A. Talbert (ed.), On Sparta (2nd ed.), London: Penguin Books, ISBN 0-14-044943-4
- Plutarch (2004), Frank Cole Babbitt (ed.), Moralia Volume III, Loeb Classical Library, Cambridge: Harvard University Press, ISBN 0-674-99270-9
- West, M. L. (1999), Greek Lyric Poetry, Oxford: Oxford University Press, ISBN 978-0-19-954039-6
