= Proetus (son of Abas) =

Mythical Greek king at Tiryns

In Greek mythology, Proetus (/ˈpriːtəs/ Ancient Greek: Προῖτος, romanized: Proîtos), the son of Abas, was a king of Argos and Tiryns.

== Family ==
Proetus's father was Abas, son of the last surviving Aegyptiad Lynceus and the Danaid Hypermnestra, had ruled over Argos and married Aglaea or Ocalea, who bore him twin sons, Proetus and Acrisius. Proetus had also an illegitimate brother named Lyrcus, son of his father by an unknown woman. According to Apollodorus, some said Proetus was father of Perseus.

By his wife, Antea or Stheneboea, Proetus became the father of three daughters (the so-called Proetides) and a son Megapenthes. The daughters' names are Lysippe, Iphinoe, and Iphianassa in the Bibliotheca and were often mentioned under the general name of Proetides; Servius calls the last two Hipponoe and Cyrianassa, whereas Aelian only mentions two, Elege and Celaene.

Comparative table of Proetus's family
Relation	Name	Sources										
Relation	Name	Homer	Hesiod	Bacchylides	Ovid	Apollodorus	Hyginus	Pausanias	Aelian	Servius	Fulgentius	Gk. Anthology
Parentage	Abas			✓			✓	✓				
Parentage	Abas and Aglaia					✓						
Sibling	Acrisius			✓	✓	✓		✓				
Wife	Antia or	✓				✓	✓				✓	
Wife	Stheneboea					✓	✓					
Children	Lysippe		✓			✓						
Children	Iphinoe		✓			✓						
Children	Iphianassa		✓			✓						
Children	Megapenthes					✓	✓	✓				✓
Children	Elege								✓			
Children	Celane								✓			
Children	Hipponoe									✓		
Children	Cyrianassa									✓		

== Mythology ==
=== Rivalry of twins ===
Proetus and Acrisius quarreled continually ever since they still were in the womb that they even carried on with the rivalry into their adult years, inventing shields or bucklers in the process. In one tradition, the conflict was reiterated when Proetus seduced Acrisius's daughter (and his own niece) Danae. Proetus started out as king of Argos, and held the throne for about seventeen years, but Acrisius defeated him in the war and exiled him. Proetus then fled to King Jobates (Iobates) or Amphianax in Lycia, and married his daughter Antea or Stheneboea. Jobates, thereupon, attempted to restore Proetus to his kingdom by armed force. After the war had gone on for a while the kingdom was divided in two. Acrisius then shared his kingdom with his brother, surrendering to him Tiryns and the eastern half of Argolis, i.e. the Heraeum, Midea and the coast of Argolis. Tiryns was said to be fortified by the Cyclopes.

=== Bellerophon ===
When Bellerophon came to Proetus to be purified of a murder which he had committed, the wife of Proetus fell in love with him, and invited him to come to her: but, as Bellerophon refused to comply with her desire, she charged him before Proetus with having made improper proposals to her. Proetus then sent Bellerophon to Iobates in Lycia, with a letter in which Iobates was desired to murder Bellerophon. Iobates challenged Bellerophon to several seemingly impossible tasks which Bellerophon did complete.

=== Madness of the Proetides ===
When Proetus's daughters arrived at the age of maturity, they were stricken with madness, the cause of which is differently stated by different authors; some say that it was a punishment inflicted upon them by Dionysus, because they had despised his worship. Others have assumed the troubles arose by Hera, because they presumed to be more beautiful than the goddess, or perhaps because they had stolen some of the gold off her statue. In this state of madness they wandered through Peloponnesus. Melampus promised to cure them, if Proetus would give him one third of his kingdom. As Proetus refused to accept these terms, the madness of his daughters not only increased, but was communicated to the other Argive women also, so that they murdered their own children and ran about in a state of frenzy. Proetus then declared himself willing to listen to the proposal of Melampus; but the latter now also demanded for his brother Bias an equal share of the kingdom of Argos. Proetus consented and Melampus, having chosen the most robust among the young men, gave chase to the mad women, amid shouting and dancing, and drove them as far as Sicyon. During this pursuit, Iphinoe, one of the daughters of Proetus, died, but the two others were cured by Melampus by means of purifications, and were then married to Melampus and Bias. There was a tradition that Proetus had founded a sanctuary of Hera, between Sicyon and Titane, and one of Apollo at Sicyon. The place where the cure was effected upon his daughters is not the same in all traditions, some mentioning the well Anigros, others the well Cleitor in Arcadia, or Lusi in Arcadia. Some even state that the Proetides were cured by Asclepius or that they were cured in the Cave of the Lakes. This story is sometimes attributed to Anaxagoras.

=== Other tales ===
In one account, Proetus had yet another daughter, Nyctaea, who fled from her own father's attempts of violation and was changed by Athena into an owl; her story is a variant for that of Nyctimene.

According to Ovid, Proetus ended up changed into stone by Perseus, the grandson of Acrisius (who had eventually got expelled by Proetus), upon being made by him to see the head of Medusa. Later Proetus's son, Megapenthes, exchanged kingdoms with Perseus.

== Argive genealogy ==
Argive genealogy in Greek mythology

Oceanus	Tethys
Inachus	Melia
Zeus	Io	Phoroneus
Epaphus	Memphis
Libya	Poseidon
Achiroë	Belus	Agenor	Telephassa
Danaus	Elephantis	Aegyptus	Cadmus	Cilix	Europa	Phoenix
Mantineus	Hypermnestra	Lynceus	Harmonia	Zeus
Sparta	Lacedaemon	Ocalea	Abas	Polydorus	Agave	Sarpedon	Rhadamanthus
Eurydice	Acrisius	Autonoë	Ino	Minos
Zeus	Danaë	Semele	Zeus
Perseus	Dionysus

Colour key:

Male
Female
Deity
