= Lyrcus (son of Abas) =

In Greek mythology, Lyrcus (Ancient Greek: Λύρκος) was the illegitimate son of Abas, king of Argos.

== Mythology ==
In Pausanias's Description of Greece, the city of Lyrceia (Greek: Λυρκεία) lies on one of the two roads which proceeded from the gate of Deiras. The northern road leads to Lyrceia and Orneae. The distance from Argos to Lyrceia is about sixty stades and the distance from Lyrceia to Orneae is the same, with Lyrceia situated between the two cities on the road named Climax. Homer in the Catalogue makes no mention of the city Lyrceia because at the time of the Greek expedition against Troy it already lay deserted.

The city was formerly called Lynceia after Lynceus, one of the 50 sons of Aegyptus. Lynceus arrived there after fleeing from the city of Argos when all of his brothers were murdered by the daughters of Danaus on their wedding night. He gave intelligence of his safe arrival to his faithful wife Hypermnestra by holding up a torch and she in like manner informed him of her safety by raising a torch from Larissa the citadel of Argos.

Lyrcus was the illegitimate son of Abas, the son of Lynceus and Hypermnestra. He was expelled from Argos and got possession of Lynceia and it was renamed Lyrceia. Later the town fell in ruins with nothing remaining except the statue of Lyrcus upon a pillar.
