= Acrisius =

Ancient Greek mythological King of Argos

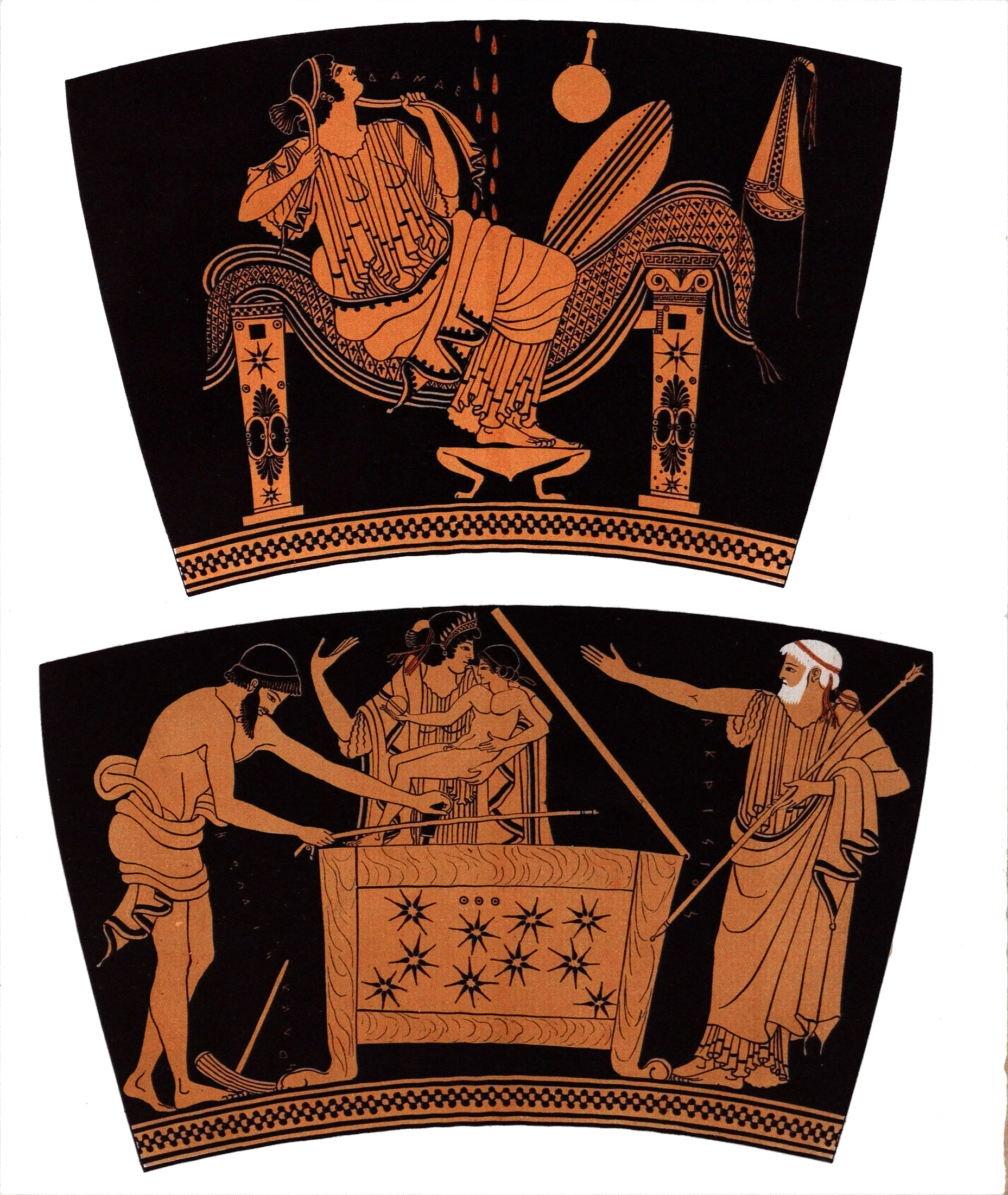
Illustration of an Attic red-figure calyx-krater; Acrisius puts Danaë and Perseus into the chest.

In Greek mythology, Acrisius (/əˈkraɪsiəs/; Ancient Greek: Ἀκρίσιος, romanized: Akrisios, lit. 'ill-judgment' or 'locust') was a king of Argos. He was the grandfather of the famous Greek demi-god Perseus through his only daughter Danaë.

== Family ==
Acrisius was the son of Abas and Aglaea (or Ocalea, depending on the author), grandson of Lynceus, great-grandson of Aegyptus. He was the twin brother of Proetus and the half brother of Lyrcus. Acrisius was the husband of Eurydice or Aganippe and thus grandfather of the hero Perseus through their daughter Danaë. His other daughter was Evarete, wife of King Oenomaus of Pisa in Elis.

== Mythology ==
=== Rivalry of twins ===
Acrisius and Proetus were said to have quarrelled even in the womb of their mother and when Abas died and Acrisius had grown up, he expelled Proetus from his inheritance. On his exile, Proetus was supported by his father-in-law Iobates, the Lycian, Proetus returned, and Acrisius was compelled to share his kingdom with his brother by giving Tiryns to him, while he retained Argos for himself.

In one version of the myth, there is no mention of the dispute between the two brothers but they divided the kingdom, Acrisius remained where he was at Argos and Proetus took over the Heraeum, Mideia, Tiryns, and the Argive coast region.

=== Death ===
Disappointed by his lack of luck in having a son, Acrisius consults the Oracle at Delphi, who warns him that he will one day be killed by his daughter's son. Danaë is childless and to keep her so, he imprisons her in a bronze chamber open to the sky in the courtyard of his palace. Zeus impregnates her in the form of a golden shower (some accounts say it is her uncle, Proetus, who impregnates her). Danaë becomes pregnant with Perseus. Acrisius puts the child and Danaë in a chest and throws it into the sea. Zeus asks Poseidon to calm the water; he does and Danaë and Perseus survive, washing up on the island of Seriphos. A fisherman named Dictys, brother of King Polydectes, finds the pair and takes care of them.

Perseus grows up to be a hero, killing Medusa and rescuing Andromeda. Perseus and Danaë return to Argos with Andromeda, but King Acrisius has gone to Larissa. When Perseus arrives in Larissa, he participates in funeral games and accidentally strikes Acrisius on the head with a discus, killing him and fulfilling the prophecy.

=== Founder of Delphic amphictyony ===
According to the Scholiast on Euripides, Acrisius was the founder of the Delphic amphictyony. Strabo believes that this amphictyony existed before the time of Acrisius, and that he was only the first who regulated the affairs of the amphictyons, fixed the towns which were to take part in the council, gave to each its vote, and settled the jurisdiction of the amphictyons.

Regnal titles
Preceded by Proetus	King of Argos; 31 years	Succeeded by Perseus

== Argive genealogy chart ==
Argive genealogy in Greek mythology

Oceanus	Tethys
Inachus	Melia
Zeus	Io	Phoroneus
Epaphus	Memphis
Libya	Poseidon
Achiroë	Belus	Agenor	Telephassa
Danaus	Elephantis	Aegyptus	Cadmus	Cilix	Europa	Phoenix
Mantineus	Hypermnestra	Lynceus	Harmonia	Zeus
Sparta	Lacedaemon	Ocalea	Abas	Polydorus	Agave	Sarpedon	Rhadamanthus
Eurydice	Acrisius	Autonoë	Ino	Minos
Zeus	Danaë	Semele	Zeus
Perseus	Dionysus

Colour key:

Male
Female
Deity
