= Lynceus (son of Aegyptus) =

Greek mythological king

- King of Argos
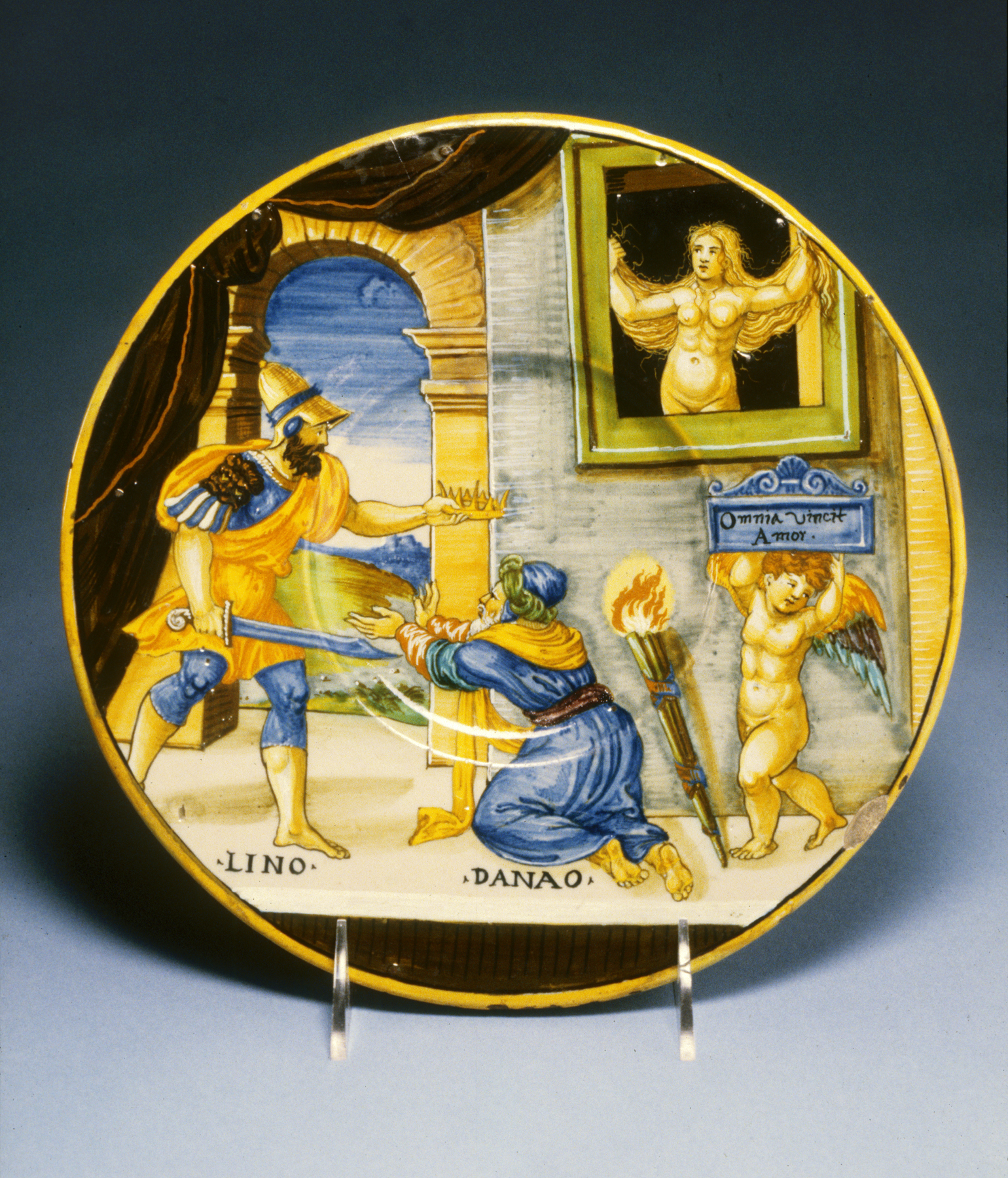
- Hypermnestra watching Lynceus take her father's crown; Cupid holds up the motto "Love Conquers All." (maiolica plate, 1537, by Francesco Xanto Avelli)
- Predecessor: Danaus
- Successor: Abas

Genealogy
- Parents: Aegyptus (father); Argyphia (mother)
- Spouse: Hypermnestra
- Children: Abas

In Greek mythology, Lynceus (/ˈlɪnsiːəs, -sjuːs/; Ancient Greek: Λυγκεύς, romanized: Lynkeús, lit. 'lynx-eyed') was a prince of Egypt and king of Argos, succeeding Danaus on the throne. Through his marriage to the Danaid Hypermnestra, he began the Danaid Dynasty that led to Perseus, hero and legendary founder of Mycenae.

== Family ==
Lynceus was one of the 50 sons of King Aegyptus of Egypt. Aegyptus had many consorts, and Lynceus was one of six sons born to Argyphia, a woman of royal blood. His five full brothers are named as Proteus, Busiris, Enceladus, Lycus, and Daiphron. Aegyptus was the son of Belus and either the naiad Achiroe, daughter of the river god Nilus, or Sida, eponym of Sidon. He was the twin brother of Danaus, an Argive king and father of the 50 Danaids.

In the most common version of the myth, Lynceus married his cousin Hypermnestra, one of the Danaids and a princess of Argos. Together they had a son, Abas, who succeeded him as king.

== Mythology ==
Lynceus's father Aegyptus commanded that his 50 sons should be able to marry his brother's 50 daughters, the Danaids. However, Danaus had previously been told by an oracle that he would die at the hand of his son-in-law, so he refused his brother and fled to Argos, where he was then made king by Pelasgus.

Aegyptus was enraged by his brother's betrayal. He organized an army led by his sons, including Lynceus, and sent them to Argos with the command that they should not return until either Danaus was dead or he had consented to let the brothers marry the Danaids. Danaus, facing siege and a probable loss, agreed to let the brothers marry his daughters in a large wedding feast where every couple was married on the same night. Couples were arranged, and Lynceus was paired with Hypermnestra (alternatively, Amymone). However, though Danaus agreed to the arrangement, he was greatly angered by his brother's actions. He gave all the Danaids swords and instructed them to kill their husbands after they had fallen asleep on their wedding night. The next morning, they were to bring their husband's heads to him as proof of the deed.

However, while all 49 other Danaids followed through and killed their husbands, Hypermnestra alone refused. In the most common version of the myth, she decided to spare Lynceus when he honored her wish to remain a virgin. After sparing her husband, Hypermnestra helped Lynceus flee back to safety either with his father in Egypt or to Lynceia, a city in Argos. In the version of the myth where he flees to Lynceia, Lynceus informed his wife of his safety by lighting a torch: she then informed him of her safety by lighting a torch from Larissa, the citadel of Argos. The city was later named Lynceia in his honor.

When Lynceus arrived back in Egypt, he informed his father of Danaus's treachery and his brothers' deaths. They raised an army and sailed to Argos, where Lynceus killed Danaus, united with Hypermnestra, and became king. According to Apollodorus however, there was no invasion and Lynceus did not kill Danaus; instead, Lynceus was passed the crown after Danaus's eventual death. Together, Hypermnestra and Lynceus had a son: Abas, who succeeded his father as king of Argos.

Regnal titles
| Preceded by Danaus | King of Argos | Succeeded by Abas |

== Argive genealogy in Greek mythology ==
Argive genealogy in Greek mythology

Inachus | Melia
Zeus | Io | Phoroneus
Epaphus | Memphis
Libya | Poseidon
Belus | Achiroë | Agenor | Telephassa
Danaus | Elephantis | Aegyptus | Cadmus | Cilix | Europa | Phoenix
Mantineus | Hypermnestra | Lynceus | Harmonia | Zeus
Polydorus
Sparta | Lacedaemon | Ocalea | Abas | Agave | Sarpedon | Rhadamanthus
Autonoë
Eurydice | Acrisius | Ino | Minos
Zeus | Danaë | Semele | Zeus
Perseus | Dionysus

Colour key:

Male
Female
Deity

== See also ==
- City of Lyrceia
