= Achaeans (Homer) =

Collective name of the Greeks in Homer's poems

The Achaeans or Akhaians (/əˈkiːənz/; Ancient Greek: Ἀχαιοί, romanized: Akhaioí, "the Achaeans" or "of Achaea") is one of the names in Homer which is used to refer to the Greeks collectively.

The term "Achaean" is believed to be related to the Hittite term Ahhiyawa and the Egyptian term Ekwesh which appear in texts from the Late Bronze Age and are believed to refer to the Mycenaean civilization or some part of it.

In the historical period, the term fell into disuse as a general term for Greek people, and was generally reserved for inhabitants of the region of Achaea, a region in the north-central part of the Peloponnese. The city-states of this region later formed a confederation known as the Achaean League, which was influential during the 3rd and 2nd centuries BC.

== Etymology ==
According to Margalit Finkelberg, the name Ἀχαιοί (earlier Ἀχαιϝοί) is possibly derived, via an intermediate form *Ἀχαϝyοί, from a hypothetical older Greek form reflected in the Hittite form Aḫḫiyawā; the latter is attested in the Hittite archives, e.g. in the Tawagalawa letter. However, Robert S. P. Beekes doubted its validity and suggested a Pre-Greek *Akay^{w}a-.

== Homeric versus later use ==
In Homer, the term Achaeans is one of the primary terms used to refer to the Greeks as a whole. It is used 598 times in the Iliad, often accompanied by the epithet "long-haired". Other common names used in Homer are Danaans (/ˈdæneɪ.ənz/; Δαναοί Danaoi; used 138 times in the Iliad) and Argives (/ˈɑːrɡaɪvz/; Ἀργεῖοι Argeioi; used 182 times in the Iliad). Panhellenes (Πανέλληνες Panellenes, "All of the Greeks") and Hellenes (/ˈhɛliːnz/; Ἕλληνες Hellenes) both appear only once. All of the aforementioned terms were used synonymously to denote a common Greek identity. In some English translations of the Iliad, the Achaeans are simply called the Greeks throughout.

Later, by the Archaic and Classical periods, the term "Achaeans" referred to inhabitants of the much smaller region of Achaea. Herodotus identified the Achaeans of the northern Peloponnese as descendants of the earlier, Homeric Achaeans. According to Pausanias, writing in the 2nd century AD, the term "Achaean" was originally given to those Greeks inhabiting the Argolis and Laconia.

Pausanias and Herodotus both recount the legend that the Achaeans were forced from their homelands by the Dorians, during the legendary Dorian invasion of the Peloponnese. They then moved into the region later called Achaea.

A scholarly consensus has not yet been reached on the origin of the historic Achaeans relative to the Homeric Achaeans and is still hotly debated. Former emphasis on presumed race, such as John A. Scott's article about the blond locks of the Achaeans as compared to the dark locks of "Mediterranean" Poseidon, on the basis of hints in Homer, has been rejected by some. The contrasting belief that "Achaeans", as understood through Homer, is "a name without a country", an ethnos created in the Epic tradition, has modern supporters among those who conclude that "Achaeans" were redefined in the 5th century BC, as contemporary speakers of Aeolic Greek.

Karl Beloch suggested there was no Dorian invasion, but rather that the Peloponnesian Dorians were the Achaeans. Eduard Meyer, disagreeing with Beloch, instead put forth the suggestion that the real-life Achaeans were mainland pre-Dorian Greeks. His conclusion is based on his research on the similarity between the languages of the Achaeans and pre-historic Arcadians. William Prentice disagreed with both, noting archeological evidence suggests the Achaeans instead migrated from "southern Asia Minor to Greece, probably settling first in lower Thessaly" probably prior to 2000 BC.

== Hittite documents ==
A map of the Hittite Empire, Ahhiyawa (Achaeans) and Wilusa (Troy) in c. 1300 BC.

Some Hittite texts mention a nation to the west called Ahhiyawa (Hittite: 𒄴𒄭𒅀𒉿 Aḫḫiyawa). In the earliest reference to this land, a letter outlining the treaty violations of the Hittite vassal Madduwatta, it is called Ahhiya. Another important example is the Tawagalawa Letter written by an unnamed Hittite king, most probably Hattusili III, of the empire period, the 14th–13th century BC, to the king of Ahhiyawa, treating him as an equal and implying Miletus (Millawanda) was under his control.

It also refers to an earlier "Wilusa episode" involving hostility on the part of Ahhiyawa. Ahhiya(wa) has been identified with the Achaeans of the Trojan War and the city of Wilusa with the legendary city of Troy. Note the similarity with early Greek Ϝιλιον Wilion, later Ἴλιον Ilion, the name of the acropolis of Troy.

Emil Forrer, a Swiss Hittitologist who worked on the Bogazköy tablets in Berlin, said the Achaeans of pre-Homeric Greece were directly associated with the term "Land of Ahhiyawa" mentioned in the Hittite texts. His conclusions at the time were challenged by other Hittitologists (i.e. Johannes Friedrich in 1927 and Albrecht Götze in 1930), as well as by Ferdinand Sommer, who published his Die Ahhijava-Urkunden (The Ahhiyawa Documents) in 1932.

The exact relationship of the term Ahhiyawa to the Achaeans beyond a similarity in pronunciation was hotly debated by scholars, even following the discovery that Mycenaean Linear B is an early form of Greek; the earlier debate was summed up in 1984 by Hans G. Güterbock. More recent research based on new readings and interpretations of the Hittite texts, as well as of the material evidence for Mycenaean contacts with the Anatolian mainland, has led to the widely supported conclusion that Ahhiyawa refers to the Mycenaean world, or at least to a part of it.

Scholars have proposed several possible locations for the Ahhiyawa capital: Rhodes in the Dodecanese Mycenae in the Argolid and Thebes in Boeotia. It is possible that the political center of Ahhiyawa was not fixed in a single location, but may have shifted over time—perhaps initially based in Thebes and later in Mycenae.

== Egyptian sources ==
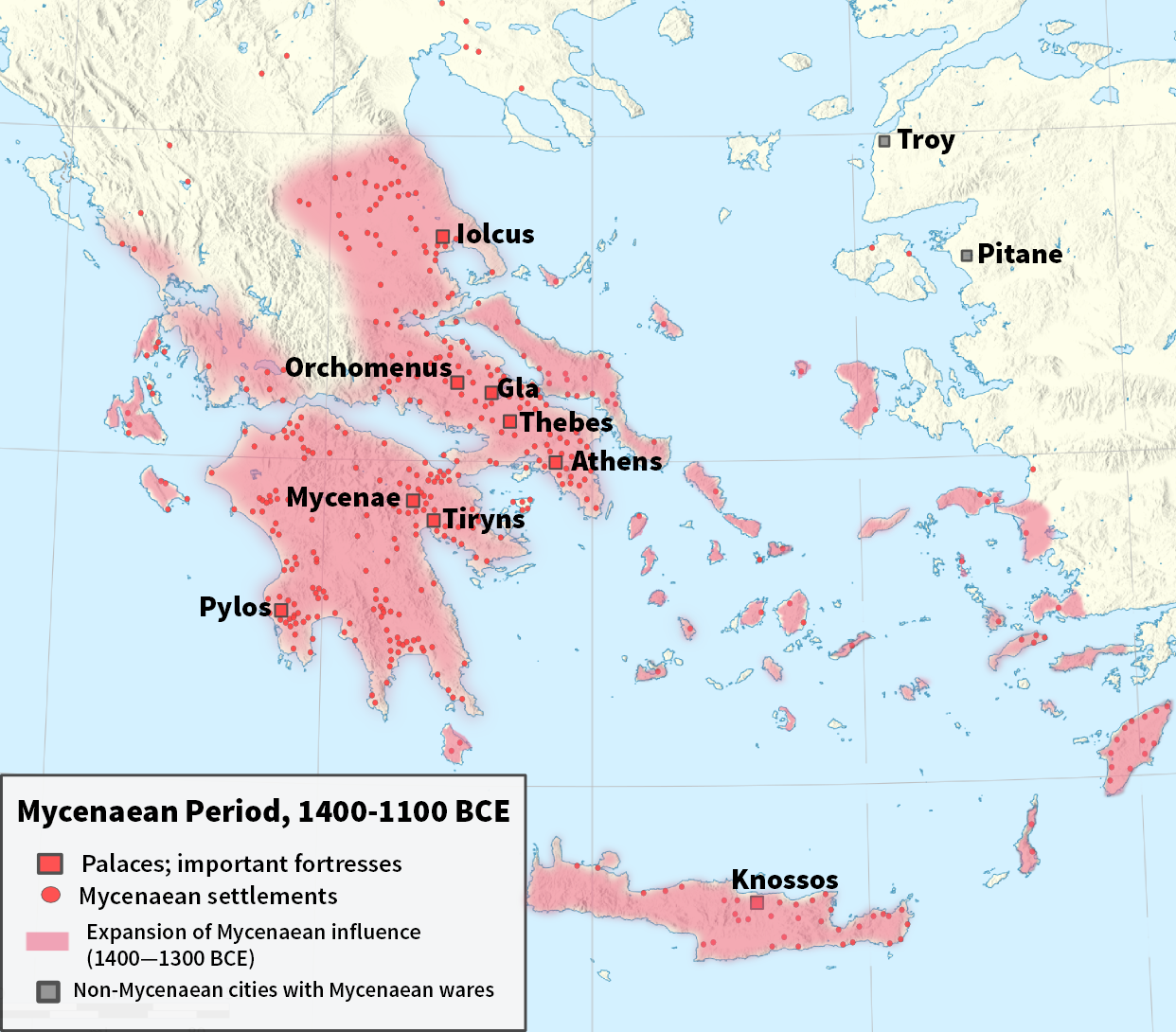
A map of Mycenaean cultural areas, 1400–1100 BC, with unearthed sites in red dots

It has been proposed that Ekwesh of the Egyptian records may relate to Achaea (compared to Hittite Ahhiyawa), whereas Denyen and Tanaju may relate to Classical Greek Danaoi. The earliest textual reference to the Mycenaean world is in the Annals of Thutmosis III (c. 1479–1425 BC), which refers to messengers from the king of the Tanaju, c. 1437 BC, offering greeting gifts to the Egyptian king, in order to initiate diplomatic relations, when the latter campaigned in Syria.

Tanaju is also listed in an inscription at the Mortuary Temple of Amenhotep III. Amenhotep III ruled Egypt in c. 1382–1344 BC. A list of the cities and regions of the Tanaju is mentioned in this inscription. Among the cities listed are Mycenae, Nauplion, Kythera, Messenia and the Thebaid (region of Thebes).

During the 5th year of Pharaoh Merneptah, a confederation of Libyan and northern peoples is supposed to have attacked the western delta. Included amongst the ethnic names of the repulsed invaders is the Ekwesh or Eqwesh, who may be connected with Achaeans. However, Merneptah's Great Karnak Inscription states the Ekwesh were circumcised, a practice not traditionally associated with Achaeans. In Book XIV of the Odyssey, the Cretan Lie of Odysseus describes an Achaean attack on the Egyptian Delta. Similarly, in Book IV of the same text, Menelaus speaks of visiting Egypt after the Trojan War. Some ancient Greek authors say that Helen had spent the time of the Trojan War in Egypt, and not at Troy, and that after Troy the Greeks went there to recover her.

== Greek mythology ==
In Greek mythology, the perceived cultural divisions among the Hellenes were represented as legendary lines of descent that identified kinship groups, with each line being derived from an eponymous ancestor. Each of the Greek ethne were said to be named in honor of their respective ancestors: Achaeus of the Achaeans, Danaus of the Danaans, Cadmus of the Cadmeans (the Thebans), Hellen of the Hellenes (not to be confused with Helen of Troy), Aeolus of the Aeolians, Ion of the Ionians, and Dorus of the Dorians.

Hellen, Graikos, Magnes, and Macedon were sons of Deucalion and Pyrrha, the only people who survived the Great Flood. The ethne were said to have originally been named Graikoi after the elder son but later renamed Hellenes after Hellen who was proved to be the strongest. The sons of Hellen and the nymph Orseis were Dorus, Xuthos, and Aeolus. The sons of Xuthos and Kreousa, daughter of Erechthea, were Ion and Achaeus.

According to Hyginus, 22 Achaeans killed 362 Trojans during their ten years at Troy.

=== Genealogy of the Argives ===
Argive genealogy in Greek mythology

Oceanus	Tethys
Inachus	Melia
Zeus	Io	Phoroneus
Epaphus	Memphis
Libya	Poseidon
Achiroë	Belus	Agenor	Telephassa
Danaus	Elephantis	Aegyptus	Cadmus	Cilix	Europa	Phoenix
Mantineus	Hypermnestra	Lynceus	Harmonia	Zeus
Sparta	Lacedaemon	Ocalea	Abas	Polydorus	Agave	Sarpedon	Rhadamanthus
Eurydice	Acrisius	Autonoë	Ino	Minos
Zeus	Danaë	Semele	Zeus
Perseus	Dionysus

Colour key:

Male
Female
Deity

== See also ==
- Achaea (modern province)
- Achaea (Roman province)
- Argead dynasty
- Aegean civilization
- Historicity of the Iliad
- Military of Mycenaean Greece
