= Abas (son of Lynceus) =

Mythological Greek king of Argos

In Greek mythology, Abas (/ˈeɪbəs/; Ancient Greek: Ἄβας; gen.: Ἄβαντος, lit. 'guileless' or 'good-hearted') was the twelfth king of Argos. He was the great-grandfather of Perseus, and the founder of the towns Abae and Argos Pelasgikon.

== Family ==
Abas was the son of Lynceus of the royal family of Argos, and Hypermnestra, the last of the Danaides. With his wife Ocalea (or Aglaea, depending on the source), he had twin sons Acrisius (grandfather of Perseus) and Proetus, and one daughter, Idomene. According to Pausanias, Abas had also an illegitimate son named Lyrcus, who gave his name to the city of Lyrcea.

The name Abantiades (/ˌæbænˈtaɪədiːz/; Ancient Greek: Ἀβαντιάδης) generally signified a descendant of this Abas, but was used especially to designate Perseus, the great-grandson of Abas, and Acrisius, a son of Abas. A female descendant of Abas, as Danaë and Atalante, was called Abantias.

== Mythology ==
Abas was a successful conqueror, and was the founder of the city of Abae in northeastern Phocis, home to the legendary oracular temple to Apollo Abaeus, and also of the Pelasgic Argos in Thessaly. When Abas informed his father of the death of Danaus, he was rewarded with the shield of his grandfather, which was sacred to Hera. Abas was said to be so fearsome a warrior that even after his death, enemies of his royal household could be put to flight simply by the sight of this shield. He bequeathed his kingdom to Acrisius and Proetus, bidding them to rule alternately, but they quarrelled even while they still shared their mother's womb.

== Argive genealogy ==
Argive genealogy in Greek mythology

Oceanus	Tethys
Inachus	Melia
Zeus	Io	Phoroneus
Epaphus	Memphis
Libya	Poseidon
Achiroë	Belus	Agenor	Telephassa
Danaus	Elephantis	Aegyptus	Cadmus	Cilix	Europa	Phoenix
Mantineus	Hypermnestra	Lynceus	Harmonia	Zeus
Sparta	Lacedaemon	Ocalea	Abas	Polydorus	Agave	Sarpedon	Rhadamanthus
Eurydice	Acrisius	Autonoë	Ino	Minos
Zeus	Danaë	Semele	Zeus
Perseus	Dionysus

Colour key:

Male
Female
Deity

== Notes ==
Regnal titles
Preceded by Lynceus	King of Argos	Succeeded by Proetus
