= Telephassa =

Lunar epithet in Greek mythology

Telephassa (/ˌtɛlɪˈfæsə/; Ancient Greek: Τηλέφασσα, romanized: Tēléphassa, lit. 'far-shining'), also spelled Telephaassa (/ˌtɛlɪfiˈæsə/; Τηλεφάασσα) and Telephe (/ˈtɛlɪfiː/; Τηλέφη), is a lunar epithet in Greek mythology that is sometimes substituted for Argiope the wife of Agenor, according to his name a "leader of men" in Phoenicia, and mother of Cadmus.

== Family ==
In one account, Telephassa was a descendant of Libya herself. In a version of the myth, Telephe was called the daughter of Epimedusa who was otherwise unknown.

Telephassa had several children, including Europa, Cilix, Cadmus, Thasus, and Phoenix. Thasus is sometimes said to be her grandchild by Cilix. Her husband was Agenor or perhaps Phoenix in a version in which Cadmus and Europa and their brothers are children of Phoenix. In the latter's version, Peirus, Phoenice and Astypale were included as Phoenix's offsprings.

== Mythology ==
Telephassa gave to her daughter, Europa, the basket of gold which was made by Hephaestus. This gift was originally bestowed by Poseidon to Libya who in turn gave this to Telephassa by the account of their blood relation.

"Now Europa's basket was of gold, an admirable thing, a great marvel and a great work of Hephaestus, given of him unto Libya the day the Earth-Shaker took her to his bed, and given of Libya unto the fair beauteous Telephassa because she was one of her own blood; and so the virgin Europa came to possess the renownèd gift, being Telephassa was her mother."

Zeus saw Europa gathering flowers, transformed himself into a white bull, and carried her away to the island of Crete. He then revealed his true identity and Europa became the first queen of Crete. Telephassa accompanied her son Cadmus on a quest to find Europa. The mother and son traveled to the islands of Rhodes and Thera before arriving in Thrace, where Telephassa fell ill and died. "On Samothrace... the mother was called Elektra or Elektryone", Karl Kerenyi notes. After burying his mother, Cadmus was told of the oracle of Delphi by the Thracians. Upon consulting the oracle, he was advised to travel until encountering a cow. He was to follow this cow and to found a city where the cow would lie down; this city became Thebes. Cilix, Europa's other brother, also searched for her and settled down in southern Asia Minor. The land was called Cilicia after him.

== Argive family tree ==
Argive genealogy in Greek mythology

Oceanus	Tethys
Inachus	Melia
Zeus	Io	Phoroneus
Epaphus	Memphis
Libya	Poseidon
Belus	Achiroë	Agenor	Telephassa
Danaus	Elephantis	Aegyptus	Cadmus	Cilix	Europa	Phoenix
Mantineus	Hypermnestra	Lynceus	Harmonia	Zeus
Polydorus
Sparta	Lacedaemon	Ocalea	Abas	Agave	Sarpedon	Rhadamanthus
Autonoë
Eurydice	Acrisius	Ino	Minos
Zeus	Danaë	Semele	Zeus
Perseus	Dionysus

Colour key:

Male
Female
Deity
