= Ocalea (mythology) =

Figure in Greek mythology

In Greek mythology, Ocalea or Ocaleia (Ancient Greek: Ὠκαλέα or Ὠκάλεια, romanized: Ōkalea or Ōkáleia) was an Argive queen as the wife of King Abas. She was the daughter of Mantineus and by her husband, she became the mother of twin sons, Acrisius and Proetus. Often, she was referred to as Aglaia.

== Argive genealogy ==
Argive genealogy in Greek mythology

Oceanus	Tethys
Inachus	Melia
Zeus	Io	Phoroneus
Epaphus	Memphis
Libya	Poseidon
Belus	Achiroë	Agenor	Telephassa
Danaus	Elephantis	Aegyptus	Cadmus	Cilix	Europa	Phoenix
Mantineus	Hypermnestra	Lynceus	Harmonia	Zeus
Polydorus
Sparta	Lacedaemon	Ocalea	Abas	Agave	Sarpedon	Rhadamanthus
Autonoë
Eurydice	Acrisius	Ino	Minos
Zeus	Danaë	Semele	Zeus
Perseus	Dionysus

Colour key:

Male
Female
Deity
