= Polydorus (son of Cadmus) =

Ancient Greek mythological Theban prince

- King of Thebes
- Member of the Theban Royal Family
- Predecessor: Pentheus
- Successor: Nycteus
- Abode: Thebes

Genealogy
- Parents: Cadmus and Harmonia
- Siblings: Semele, Ino, Agave and Autonoë
- Consort: Nycteïs
- Children: Labdacus

In Greek mythology, Polydorus or Polydoros (/ˌpɒlɪˈdɔːrəs/; Ancient Greek: Πολύδωρος, romanized: Polýdōros, lit. 'many-gift[ed]', 'one who has received many gifts' or 'richly endowed') was a king of Thebes.

== Family ==
Polydorus was the youngest and only male child of Cadmus and Harmonia, his sisters were Autonoë, Ino, Agave and Semele. He was the father of Labdacus by Nycteïs, the daughter of Nycteus.

Last of all Harmonia added a little son to the brood of sisters, and made Cadmos happy – Polydoros, the morning star of the Aonian nation, younger than rosy cheek Semele.

== Mythology ==
Upon the death of Cadmus, Pentheus, the son of Echion and Agave, after banishing Polydorus ruled Thebes for a short time until Dionysus prompted Agave to kill Pentheus. Polydorus then succeeded Pentheus as king of Thebes and married Nycteïs. When their son Labdacus was still young, Polydorus died of unknown causes, entrusting his father-in-law Nycteus to care the infant prince and to be his regent.

In Pausanias's history, Polydorus's rule began when his father abdicated the throne and together with his mother Harmonia migrated to the Illyrian tribe of the Enchelii, but this is the only source for such a timeline. It is also said that along with the thunderbolt hurled at the bridal chamber of Semele there fell a log from heaven. This log was adorned by Polydorus with bronze and called it Dionysus Cadmus.

A different account by Diodorus stated that the Thebans were exiled a second time (the first time during the reign of Cadmus) for Polydorus came back and was dissatisfied with the situation because of the misfortunes that had befallen Amphion, the previous king, in connection with his children.

Regnal titles
Preceded by Pentheus	King of Thebes	Succeeded by Nycteus

== Genealogy ==
Argive genealogy in Greek mythology

Oceanus	Tethys
Inachus	Melia
Zeus	Io	Phoroneus
Epaphus	Memphis
Libya	Poseidon
Achiroë	Belus	Agenor	Telephassa
Danaus	Elephantis	Aegyptus	Cadmus	Cilix	Europa	Phoenix
Mantineus	Hypermnestra	Lynceus	Harmonia	Zeus
Sparta	Lacedaemon	Ocalea	Abas	Polydorus	Agave	Sarpedon	Rhadamanthus
Eurydice	Acrisius	Autonoë	Ino	Minos
Zeus	Danaë	Semele	Zeus
Perseus	Dionysus

Colour key:

Male
Female
Deity

== Family tree of Theban Royal House ==
Royal House of Thebes
- Solid lines indicate descendants.
- Dashed lines indicate marriages.
- Dotted lines indicate extra-marital relationships or adoptions.
- Kings of Thebes are numbered with bold names and a light purple background.
  - Joint rules are indicated by a number and lowercase letter, for example, 5a. Amphion shared the throne with 5b. Zethus.
- Regents of Thebes are alphanumbered (format AN) with bold names and a light red background.
  - The number N refers to the regency preceding the reign of the N^{th} king. Generally this means the regent served the N^{th} king but not always, as Creon (A9) was serving as regent to Laodamas (the 10th King) when he was slain by Lycus II (the usurping 9th king).
  - The letter A refers to the regency sequence. "A" is the first regent, "B" is the second, etc.
- Deities have a yellow background color.

Harmonia	1. Cadmus	Polyxo	A4. Nycteus (Regent)	Dirce	B4 & A6. Lycus (Regent)
Zeus	Zeus
Ino	Agave	Echion	3. Polydorus	Nycteis	Antiope
Semele	Autonoë
Dionysus	2. Pentheus	Epeiros	4. Labdacus	5a. Amphion	5b. Zethus
Oclasus
Menoeceus
Eurydice	A7, A8 & A9. Creon (Regent)	Jocasta	6. Laius	Merope	Polybus
Hipponome	Alcaeus
Zeus
Alcmene	Amphitryon	Perimede	7. Oedipus
Megara	Heracles	Iphicles	Anaxo
Henioche	Megareus	Haemon	Antigone	8b. Eteocles	Argea	8a. Polynices
Pyrrha	Lycomedes	Ismene	9. Lycus II
A12. Peneleos (Regent)	10. Laodamas	Demonassa	11. Thersander
Opheltes	12. Tisamenus
14. Damasichthon	13. Autesion
15. Ptolemy	Theras	Argeia	Aristodemus
16. Xanthos	Eurysthenes	Procles
