= Orneae =

Town in ancient Argolis

Coordinates: 37°42′50″N 22°33′26″E

Orneae or Orneai (Ancient Greek: Ὀρνέαι) was a town in ancient Argolis, mentioned by Homer in the Catalogue of Ships in the Iliad, which is said to have derived its name from Orneus, the son of Erechtheus, or could take it from Ornea, a naiad and daughter of the river god Asopus. Orneae retained its ancient Cynurian inhabitants, when Argos was conquered by the Dorians. According to Pausanias, it continued independent of Argos for a long time; but it was finally conquered by the Argives, who removed the Orneatae to their own city. Thucydides mentions the Orneatae and Cleonaei as allies (σύμμαχοι) of the Argives in 418 BCE; and the same historian relates that Orneae was destroyed by the Argives in 416 BCE. It might therefore be inferred that the destruction of Orneae by the Argives in 416 BCE is the event referred to by Pausanias. But Herodotus states that Orneae had been conquered by Argos long before; that its inhabitants were reduced to the condition of Perioeci; and that all the Perioeci in the Argeia were called Orneatae from this place. But the Orneatae mentioned by Thucydides could not have been Perioeci, since they are called allies. "The Cynurians," says Herodotus, "have become Doricized by the Argives and by time, being Orneatae and Perioeci." These words would seem clearly to mean that, while the other Cynurians became Perioeci, the Orneatae continued independent, an interpretation which is in accordance with the account of Thucydides.

With respect to the site of Orneae we learn from Pausanias that it was situated on the confines of Phliasia and Sicyonia, at the distance of 120 stadia from Argos, being 60 stadia from Lyrceia, which was also 60 stadia from Argos. Strabo says that Orneae was situated on a river of the same name above the plain of the Sicyonians. Orneae stood on the northern of the two roads, which led from Argos to Mantineia. This northern road was called Climax, and followed the course of the Inachus.

Its site is located near the modern Lyrkeia.
