= Agave (daughter of Cadmus) =

Figure in Greek mythology

- Princess of Boiotian Thebes
- Member of the Theban Royal Family
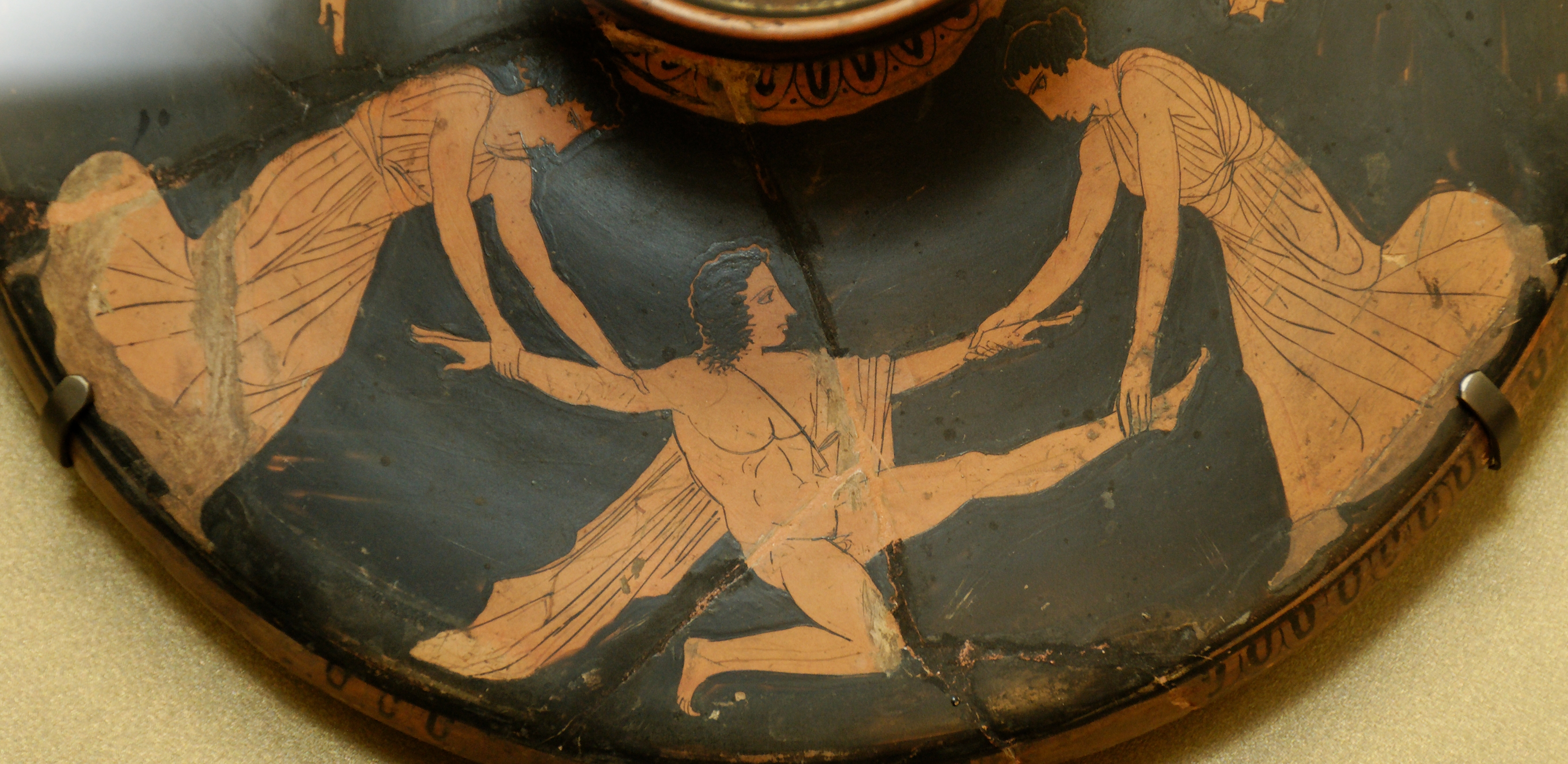
- Pentheus being torn apart by Agave and Ino

Genealogy
- Parents: Cadmus and Harmonia
- Siblings: Autonoë, Ino, Semele and Polydorus
- Consort: Echion, one of the Spartoi
- Children: Pentheus and Epirus

In Greek mythology, Agave (/ˈæɡəvi/; Ancient Greek: Ἀγαύη, romanized: Agaúē, lit. 'illustrious' or 'high-born'), was the daughter of Cadmus and a princess of Thebes. She is most well known for her role in the myths surrounding her nephew, Dionysus, god of wine.

== Family ==
Agave was the eldest daughter of Cadmus, a legendary hero, king, and founder of the city of Thebes, and of the goddess Harmonia, goddess of harmony. She had three sisters: Autonoë, Ino and Semele, and a brother, Polydorus. Agave married Echion, one of the five Spartoi, and was the mother of Pentheus, a king of Thebes, and Epirus.

== Mythology ==
In Euripides' play The Bacchae, Semele, while pregnant with Dionysus, was tricked by Hera into witnessing the true form of Zeus, and was destroyed by the sight. Agave, Ino, and Autonoë began to spread a rumor that Semele had only been pretending that Zeus was the father of her child in order to conceal the fact that she was pregnant out of wedlock with the child of a mortal man, and that her death was a punishment for her actions. These claims directly invalidated the divinity of Dionysus, and he vowed to prove his godhood and avenge the reputation of his mother.

To get revenge, Dionysus arrived in Thebes with his Maenads to celebrate a Dionysiac festival on Mount Cithaeron. He drives the women of Thebes mad with revelry, including Agave. The women wandered the forests of Thebes, suckling animals, twining snakes in their hair, and performing miraculous feats, such as ripping cattle apart with their bare hands. Pentheus, successor king of Thebes and son of Agave, was horrified by the strange festivals and banned any form of Dionysian worship. He wanted to control the frenzied mob of women with armed force (likely by massacring them), but was instead convinced by a disguised Dionysus to spy on them first, disguised as a Maenad. Once Pentheus donned his disguise, he headed to Cithaeron with Dionysus and hid in a tree to watch the women. However, Dionysus exposed his true form to his followers, and revealed Pentheus' hiding spot to them. The Maenads, led by a frenzied Agave, pulled Pentheus down from the tree, ripped off his limbs and head, and tore his body to pieces.

Agave, still mad, arrived back in Thebes with Pentheus' bloodied head on a spike, believing it is the head of a lion. She proudly reveals the head to her father Cadmus, believing he will delight in her trophy, and is shocked when he is instead horrified. It is only when Agave begins to call out to Pentheus to come and look at her trophy, that her madness begins to fade, and she realizes what she has done.

According to Hyginus, Agave and her sisters were exiled from Thebes. Agave reportedly fled to Illyria to marry King Lycotherses, and then killed him in order to gain the city for her father Cadmus. However, according to William Smith, Hyginus' account is "manifestly transplaced by Hyginus, and must have belonged to an earlier part of the story of Agave".

== Genealogy ==
Argive genealogy in Greek mythology

Inachus	Melia
Zeus	Io	Phoroneus
Epaphus	Memphis
Libya	Poseidon
Belus	Achiroë	Agenor	Telephassa
Danaus	Elephantis	Aegyptus	Cadmus	Cilix	Europa	Phoenix
Mantineus	Hypermnestra	Lynceus	Harmonia	Zeus
Polydorus
Sparta	Lacedaemon	Ocalea	Abas	Agave	Sarpedon	Rhadamanthus
Autonoë
Eurydice	Acrisius	Ino	Minos
Zeus	Danaë	Semele	Zeus
Perseus	Dionysus

Colour key:

Male
Female
Deity

== Family tree of the Theban royal house ==
Royal house of Thebes family tree
- Solid lines indicate descendants.
- Dashed lines indicate marriages.
- Dotted lines indicate extra-marital relationships or adoptions.
- Kings of Thebes are numbered with bold names and a light purple background.
  - Joint rules are indicated by a number and lowercase letter, for example, 5a. Amphion shared the throne with 5b. Zethus.
- Regents of Thebes are alphanumbered (format AN) with bold names and a light red background.
  - The number N refers to the regency preceding the reign of the N^{th} king. Generally this means the regent served the N^{th} king but not always, as Creon (A9) was serving as regent to Laodamas (the 10th King) when he was slain by Lycus II (the usurping 9th king).
  - The letter A refers to the regency sequence. "A" is the first regent, "B" is the second, etc.
- Deities have a yellow background color.

Harmonia	1. Cadmus	Polyxo	A4. Nycteus (Regent)	Dirce	B4 & A6. Lycus (Regent)
Zeus	Zeus
Ino	Agave	Echion	3. Polydorus	Nycteis	Antiope
Semele	Autonoë
Dionysus	2. Pentheus	Epeiros	4. Labdacus	5a. Amphion	5b. Zethus
Menoeceus
Eurydice	A7, A8 & A9. Creon (Regent)	Jocasta	6. Laius	Merope	Polybus
Hipponome	Alcaeus
Zeus
Alcmene	Amphitryon	Perimede	7. Oedipus
Megara	Heracles	Iphicles	Anaxo
Henioche	Megareus	Haemon	Antigone	8b. Eteocles	Argea	8a. Polynices
Pyrrha	Lycomedes	Ismene	9. Lycus II
A12. Peneleos (Regent)	10. Laodamas	Demonassa	11. Thersander
Opheltes	12. Tisamenus
14. Damasichthon	13. Autesion
15. Ptolemy	Theras	Argeia	Aristodemus
16. Xanthos	Eurysthenes	Procles

== Gallery ==
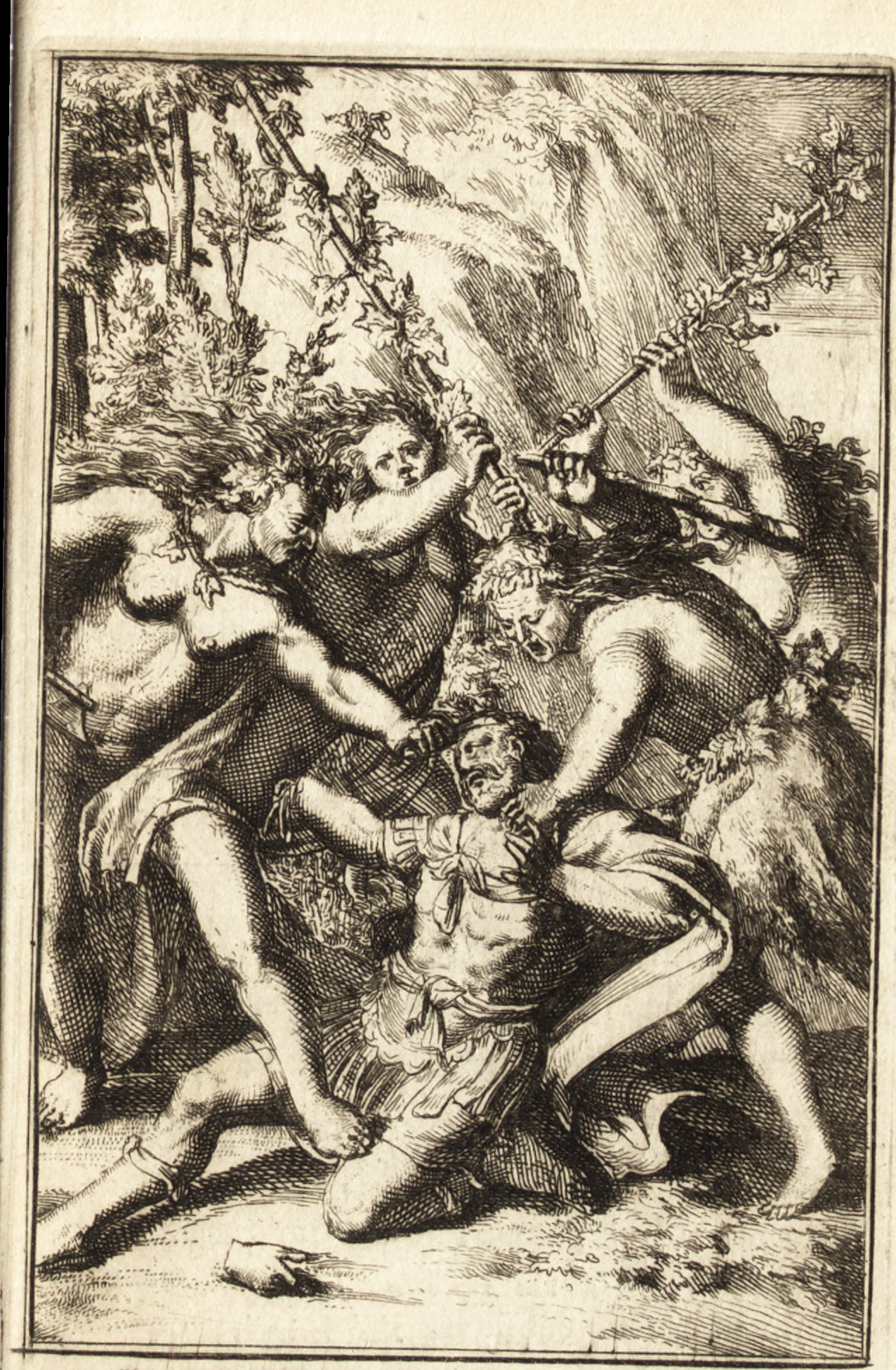
Pictura loquens; sive Heroicarum tabularum Hadriani Schoonebeeck enarratio et explicatio (1695)

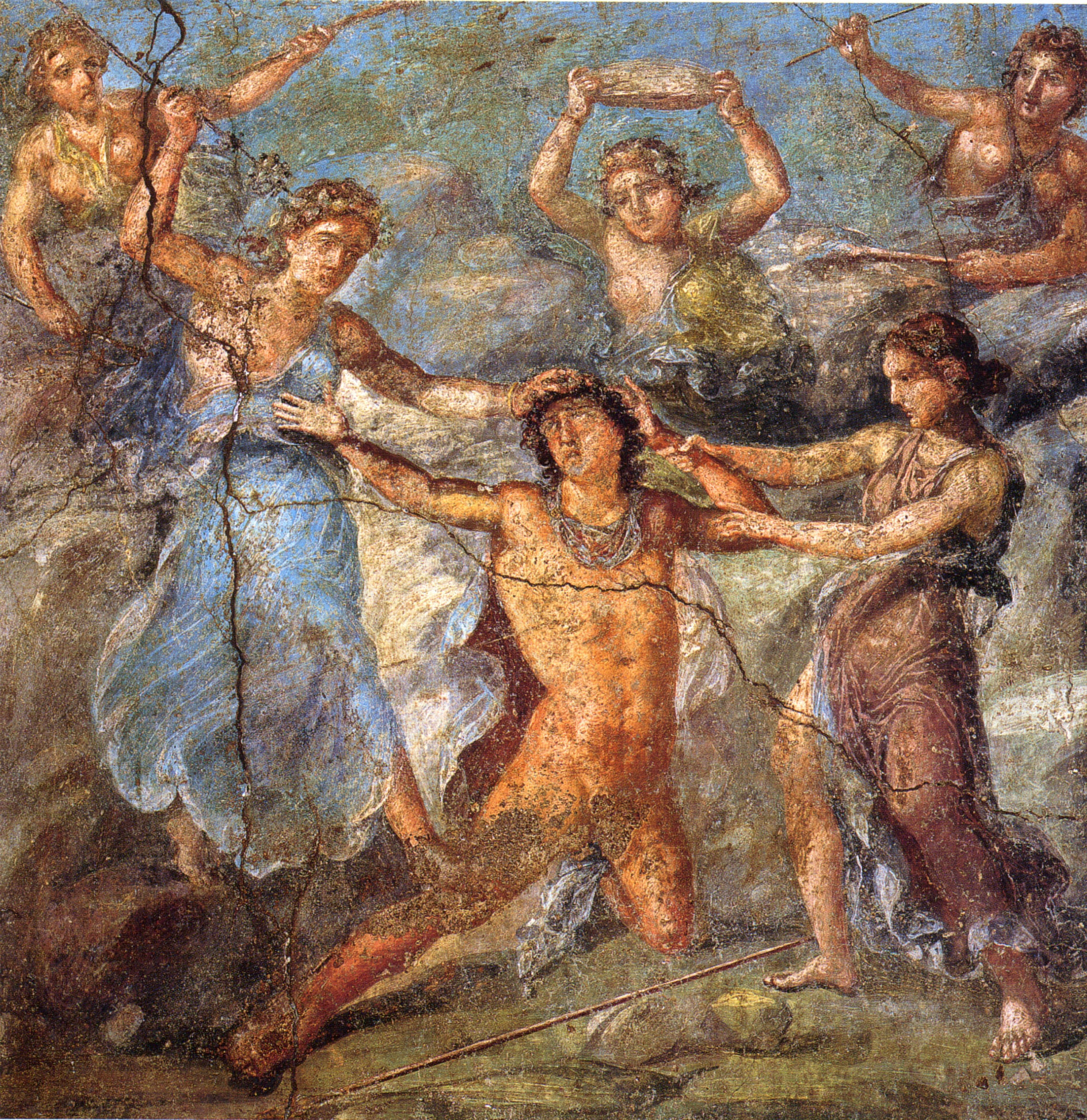
Pompeii - Casa dei Vettii - Pentheus.jpg

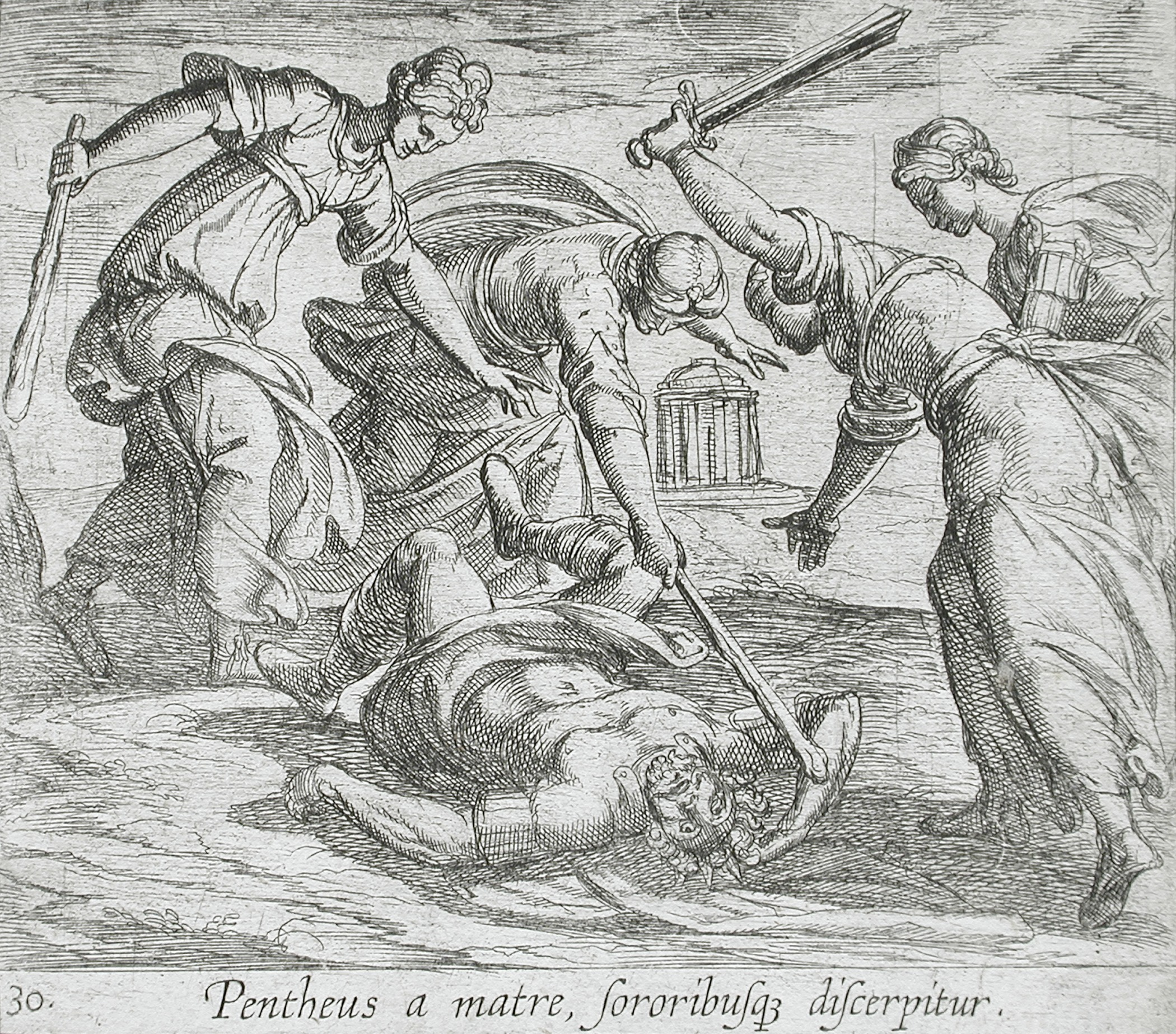
The Death of Pentheus
