= Rhadamanthus =

Greek mythology character, son of Zeus and Europa

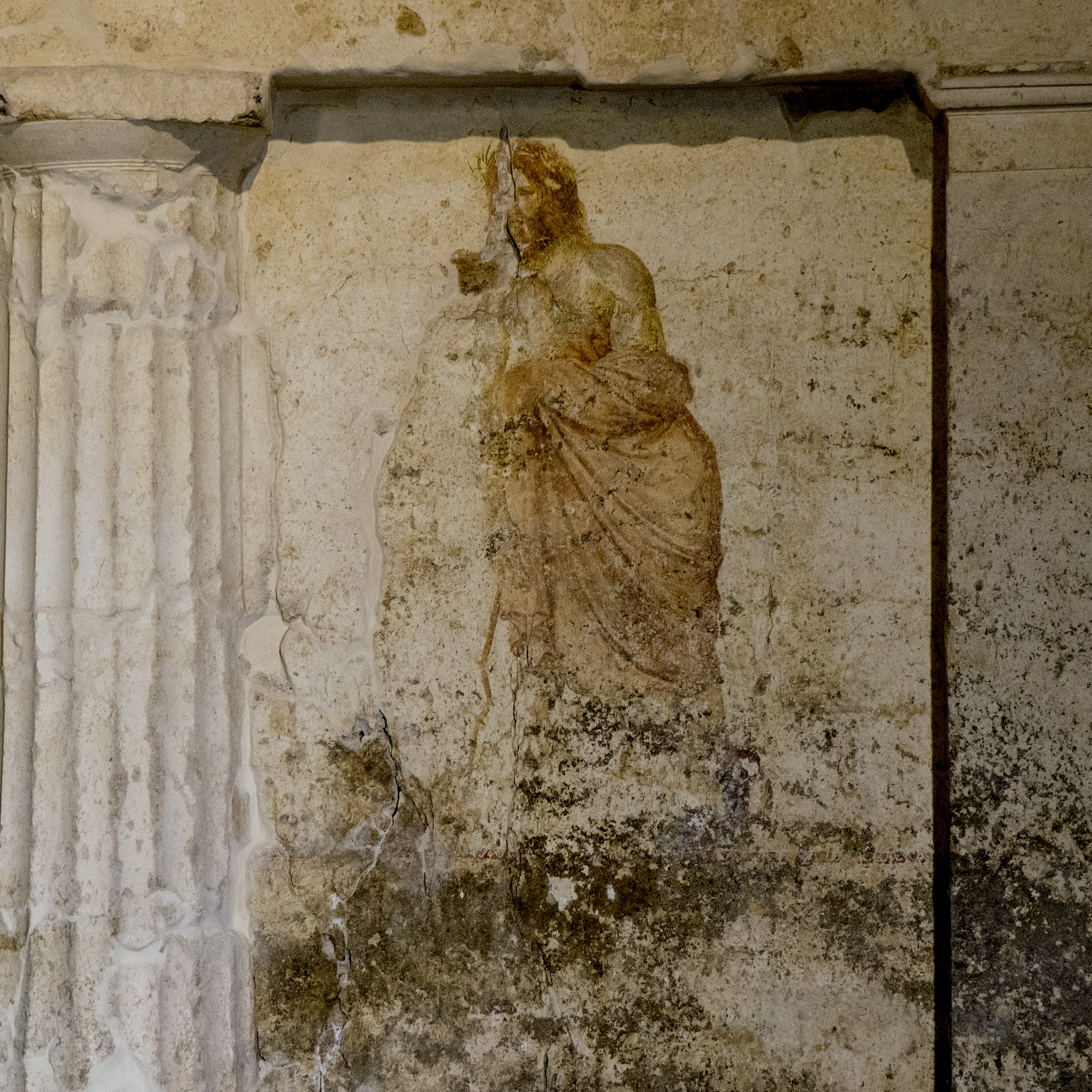
Depiction of Rhadamanthys in the Tomb of Judgement, Lefkadia, c. 300–250 BC

In Greek mythology, Rhadamanthus (/ˌrædəˈmænθəs/) or Rhadamanthys (Ancient Greek: Ῥαδάμανθυς) was a wise king of Crete. As the son of Zeus and Europa he was considered a demigod. He later became one of the judges of the dead and an important figure in Greek mythology.

His name, whose etymology is obscure, was later used to allude to persons showing stern and inflexible judgement.

== Family ==
Rhadamanthus was, according to Bulfinch's The Age of Fable, the son of Zeus and Europa and brother to Sarpedon and Minos (also a king and later a judge of the dead). Together with his brother, Rhadamanthus was raised by Asterion, their stepfather. He had two sons, Gortys (associated with Gortyn, Crete) and Erythrus (founder of Erythrae).

A different tradition represents Rhadamanthys as the son of Hephaestus, Hephaestus as a son of Talos, and Talos as a son of Cres, the personification of Crete. This tradition is reported by Pausanias, who cites the poet Cinaethon of Sparta as his source. According to Athenaeus, the lyric poet Ibycus wrote of Rhadamanthys as the lover of Talos, rather than grandson. The Suda, a Byzantine encyclopedia from the tenth-century CE, adds to this that Talos and Rhadamanthus introduced homosexuality to Crete.

Other sources (e.g. Plutarch, Theseus 20) credit Rhadamanthys rather than Dionysus as the husband of Ariadne, and the father of Oenopion, Staphylus and Thoas. In this account, Ariadne was the daughter of Minos, Rhadamanthys's brother; another Ariadne was the daughter of Minos's grandson and namesake, who features in Theseus's legend and was rescued by Dionysus.

== Mythology ==
=== Legislation ===
Although he was frequently considered one of the judges of the dead in the underworld, he was also known for a few legislative activities. There is a reference to a law of Rhadamanthus ordering the Cretans to swear oaths by animals and to another law of Rhadamanthus saying if people defend themselves against others who initiated violence then they should suffer no penalty. His legislation, and its subsequent analogue in Lacadaemonian Sparta, is briefly described in Book I of Plato's Laws, after he is introduced as the brother of Minos, and credited with being the justest of men and an administrator of justice.

Athenian: And first, I want to know why the law has ordained that you shall have common meals and gymnastic exercises, and wear arms? Cleinias of Crete: I think, Stranger, that the aim of our institutions is easily intelligible to any one. Look at the character of our country: Crete is not like Thessaly, a large plain; and for this reason they have horsemen in Thessaly, and we have runners—the inequality of the ground in our country is more adapted to locomotion on foot; but then, if you have runners you must have light arms,—no one can carry a heavy weight when running, and bows and arrows are convenient because they are light. Now all these regulations have been made with a view to war, and the legislator appears to me to have looked to this in all his arrangements:—the common meals, if I am not mistaken, were instituted by him for a similar reason, because he saw that while they are in the field the citizens are by the nature of the case compelled to take their meals together for the sake of mutual protection. He seems to me to have thought the world foolish in not understanding that all men are always at war with one another; and if in war there ought to be common meals and certain persons regularly appointed under others to protect an army, they should be continued in peace. For what men in general term peace would be said by him to be only a name; in reality every city is in a natural state of war with every other, not indeed proclaimed by heralds, but everlasting. And if you look closely, you will find that this was the intention of the Cretan legislator; all institutions, private as well as public, were arranged by him with a view to war; in giving them he was under the impression that no possessions or institutions are of any value to him who is defeated in battle; for all the good things of the conquered pass into the hands of the conquerors.

— Plato's Laws, Book I

=== Exile from Crete ===
King Asterius died childless and Minos inherited the throne. When Minos became the king of Crete, he drove Rhadamanthus out of Crete, because he had been jealous of his popularity. Rhadamanthus fled to Boeotia, where he married Alcmene, widow of Amphitryon and mother of Heracles. According to some traditions, he became a tutor to Heracles, teaching him to shoot a bow. This is also mentioned by John Tzetzes, a Byzantine poet and scholar.

In general, the particular sphere of activity of Rhadamanthus tends to be the Aegean islands, apart from Crete itself, where Minos was active. He is also often connected by ancient authors with central Greece.

=== Afterlife ===
According to later legends (c. 400 BC), on account of his inflexible integrity he was made one of the judges of the dead in the lower world, together with his half-brother Aeacus and his full-brother Minos. He was supposed to judge the souls of easterners, Aeacus those of westerners, while Minos had the casting vote (Plato, Gorgias 524A). He is portrayed in Books 4 and 7 of Homer's Odyssey. Virgil (69–18 BC) makes Rhadamanthus one of the judges and punishers of the unworthy in the Underworld (Tartarus) section of the Aeneid.

Homer represents him as dwelling in the Elysian Fields (Odyssey iv. 564), the paradise for the immortal sons of Zeus. Pindar says that he is the right-hand man of Cronus (now ruling Elysium) and was the sole judge of the dead. Lucian depicts Rhadamanthus as presiding over the company of heroes on the Isles of the Blest in True History.

== Argive Genealogy ==
Argive genealogy in Greek mythology

Oceanus | Tethys
Inachus | Melia
Zeus | Io | Phoroneus
Epaphus | Memphis
Libya | Poseidon
Achiroë | Belus | Agenor | Telephassa
Danaus | Elephantis | Aegyptus | Cadmus | Cilix | Europa | Phoenix
Mantineus | Hypermnestra | Lynceus | Harmonia | Zeus
Sparta | Lacedaemon | Ocalea | Abas | Polydorus | Agave | Sarpedon | Rhadamanthus
Eurydice | Acrisius | Autonoë | Ino | Minos
Zeus | Danaë | Semele | Zeus
Perseus | Dionysus

Colour key:

Male
Female
Deity

== See also ==
- Chinvat Bridge, the bridge of the dead in Persian cosmology
- Sraosha, Mithra and Rashnu, guardians and judges of souls in Zoroastrian tradition
