= Phoroneus =

Character in Greek mythology

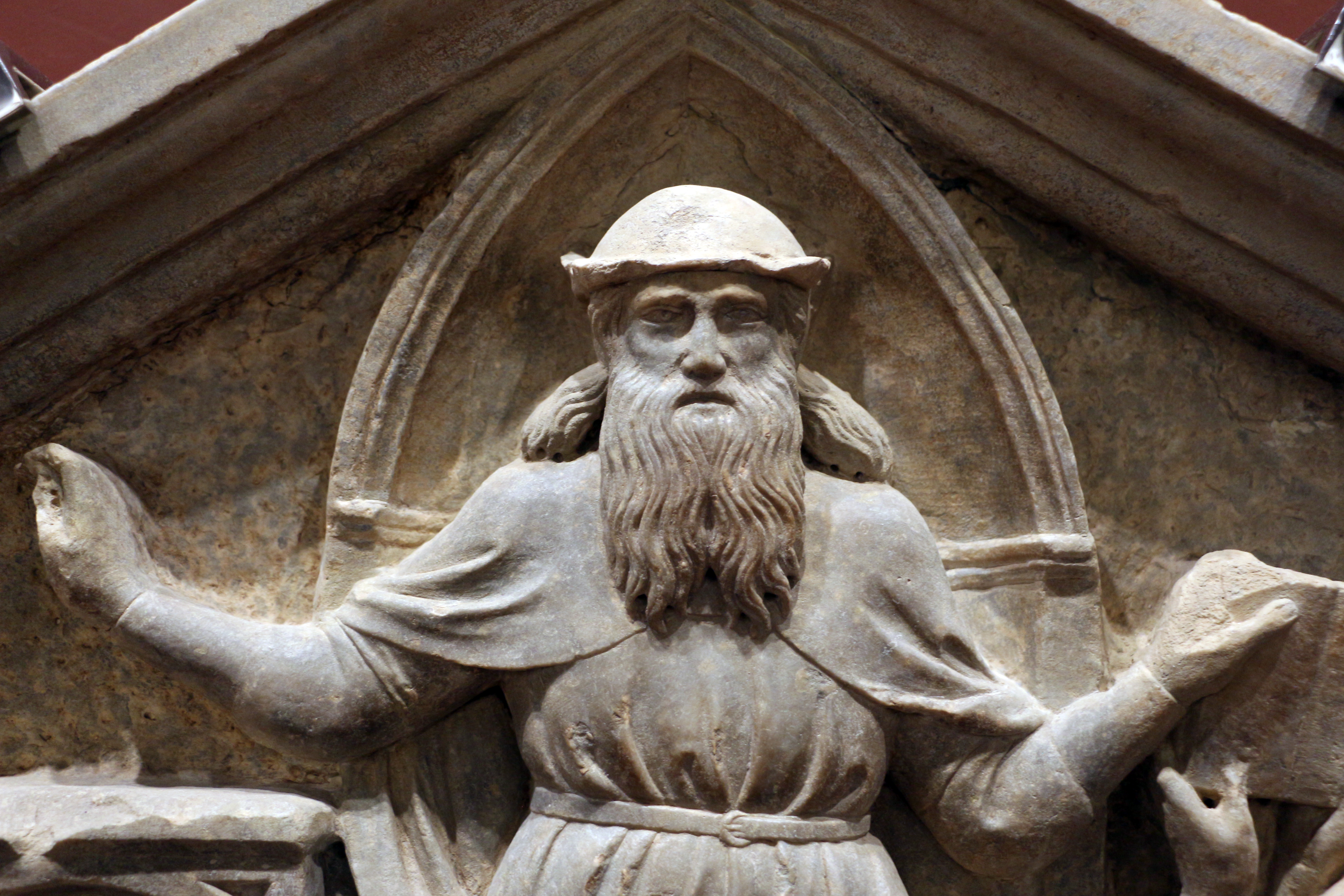
Relief from Giotto's Campanile, depicting Phoroneus as the man who invented law.

In Greek mythology, Phoroneus (/fəˈrɒn.juːs/; Ancient Greek: Φορωνεύς, lit. 'bringer of a price') was a culture-hero of the Argolid, fire-bringer, law giver, and primordial king of Argos.

== Family ==
Phoroneus was the son of the river god Inachus and either Melia, the Oceanid or Argia, the embodiment of the Argolid itself: "Inachus, son of Oceanus, begat Phoroneus by his sister Argia."

He was said to have been married to Cinna; or Cerdo, a nymph; or Teledice, also a nymph; or Perimede; or Peitho, and to have fathered a number of children including Apis, Car, Chthonia, Clymenus, Sparton, Lyrcus and Europs, an illegitimate son. An unnamed daughter of his is said to have consorted with Hecaterus and thus became the mother of the five Hecaterides, nymphs of the rustic dance.

In Argive culture, Niobe is associated with Phoroneus, sometimes as his mother, sometimes as his daughter, or as his consort (Kerenyi). According to Hellanicus of Lesbos, Phoroneus had at least three sons: Agenor, Jasus, and Pelasgus. After the death of Phoroneus, the two elder brothers divided his dominions. Pelasgus received the country about the river Erasmus and built Larissa, and Iasus received the country about Elis. After the death of these two, Agenor, the youngest, invaded their dominions and thus became king of Argos.

The Clementine Recognitions mentions Phthia, a daughter of Phoroneus, who became the mother of Achaeus by Zeus.

Comparative table of Phoroneus' family
Relation	Names	Sources									
Relation	Names	Hellanicus	Σ ad Pindar	Σ ad Euripides	Parthenius	Strabo	Apollodorus	Pausanias	Hyginus	Clement	Tzetzes
Parents	Inachus							✓			
Parents	Inachus and Melia						✓				
Parents	Inachus and Argia								✓		
Wife	Perimede		✓								
Wife	Peitho			✓							
Wife	Teledice						✓				✓
Wife	Cerdo							✓			
Wife	Cinna								✓		
Children	Agenor	✓									
Children	Jasus	✓									
Children	Pelasgus	✓									
Children	Aegialeus			✓							
Children	Apis			✓			✓		✓		✓
Children	Niobe or Nioba			✓			✓		✓		✓
Children	Lyrcus				✓						
Children	wife of Hecaterus					✓					
Children	Car							✓			
Children	Europs			✓				✓			
Children	Chthonia							✓			
Children	Clymenus							✓			
Children	Sparton							✓			
Children	Phthia									✓	

== Reign ==
Hyginus' genealogy expresses the position of Phoroneus as one of the primordial men, whose local identities differed in the various regions of Greece, and who had for a mother the essential spirit of the very earth of Argos herself, Argia. He was the primordial king in the Peloponnesus, authorized by Zeus: "Formerly Zeus himself had ruled over men, but Hermes created a confusion of human speech, which spoiled Zeus' pleasure in this Rule". Phoroneus introduced both the worship of Hera and the use of fire and the forge. Poseidon and Hera had vied for the Argive when the primeval waters had receded, Phoroneus "was the first to gather the people together into a community; for they had up to then been living as scattered and lonesome families". (Pausanias).

Phoroneus' successor was Argus, who was Niobe's son, either by Zeus or Phoroneus himself. He was also the father of Apis, who may have also ruled Argos (according to Tatiānus). He was worshipped in Argos with an eternal fire that was shown to Pausanias in the 2nd century CE, and funeral sacrifices were offered to him at his tomb-sanctuary. He is also credited as the founder of law.

Regnal titles
Preceded by Inachus	King of Argos	Succeeded by Apis

PHORONEUS' CHRONOLOGY OF REIGN ACCORDING TO VARIOUS SOURCES
Kings of Argos	Regnal Years		Castor	Regnal Years		Syncellus	Regnal Years	Apollodorus	Hyginus	Tatian	Pausanias
Precessor	1677	50 winters & summers	Inachus	1677.5	56 winters & summers	Inachus	1675	Inachus	-do-	-do-	-do-
Phoroneus	1652	60 winters & summers	Phoroneus	1649.5	60 winters & summers	Phoroneus	1650	Phoroneus	-do-	-do-	-do-
Successor	1622	35 winters & summers	Apis	1619.5	35 winters & summers	Apis	1625	Apis	-do-	-do-	-do-

== Argive genealogy ==
Argive genealogy in Greek mythology

Oceanus	Tethys
Inachus	Melia
Zeus	Io	Phoroneus
Epaphus	Memphis
Libya	Poseidon
Achiroë	Belus	Agenor	Telephassa
Danaus	Elephantis	Aegyptus	Cadmus	Cilix	Europa	Phoenix
Mantineus	Hypermnestra	Lynceus	Harmonia	Zeus
Sparta	Lacedaemon	Ocalea	Abas	Polydorus	Agave	Sarpedon	Rhadamanthus
Eurydice	Acrisius	Autonoë	Ino	Minos
Zeus	Danaë	Semele	Zeus
Perseus	Dionysus

Colour key:

Male
Female
Deity
