= Libya (daughter of Epaphus) =

Goddess in Roman and Greek mythology

Modern representation of the geography in Herodotus's Histories, showing the area of Libya in north Africa, circa 450 BC

Libya, Libye, Lybie or Lybee (Ancient Greek: Λιβύη, romanized: Libúē or Libýē or Λυβίη, Lybíē) was the daughter of Epaphus, King of Egypt, in both Greek and Roman mythology. She personified the land of Ancient Libya in North Africa, and was considered by the Greeks to be the origin of the name of what is now Libya.

== Mythology ==
As with much of Africa, the region of Libya was viewed in the lens of Greek mythology as a distant place. While Greeks are known to have been in contact with Africa since at least the Bronze Age, trade was largely centered on exchange with Egypt, from which it is likely that the term Libya actually originates (specifically in reference to the tribe of Libu).

Personified as an individual, Libya was the daughter of Epaphus, the mythological king of Egypt and alleged founder of the city of Memphis. The mother of Libya is disputed, with some texts declaring her mother to be Memphis, daughter of the river-god Nilus. In Hyginus's Fabulae as well as Isidore of Seville's Etymologies, her mother was called Cassiopeia. In one account, Libya was the sister of Telegonus being children of Epaphus.

Libya was ravished by the god Poseidon to whom she bore twin sons, Belus and Agenor. Some sources name a third son, named Lelex. According to late accounts, Lybee (Libya) was the daughter of Munantius (i.e. Epaphus) who consorted instead with Zeus and became the mother of Belus.

Libya is also the mother of Calliste by Triton.

== Argive genealogy in Greek mythology ==
Argive genealogy in Greek mythology

Oceanus	Tethys
Inachus	Melia
Zeus	Io	Phoroneus
Epaphus	Memphis
Libya	Poseidon
Achiroë	Belus	Agenor	Telephassa
Danaus	Elephantis	Aegyptus	Cadmus	Cilix	Europa	Phoenix
Mantineus	Hypermnestra	Lynceus	Harmonia	Zeus
Sparta	Lacedaemon	Ocalea	Abas	Polydorus	Agave	Sarpedon	Rhadamanthus
Eurydice	Acrisius	Autonoë	Ino	Minos
Zeus	Danaë	Semele	Zeus
Perseus	Dionysus

Colour key:

Male
Female
Deity
