= Ferdinand Sommer =

Ferdinand Sommer (4 May 1875, in Trier – 3 April 1962, in Munich) was a German classical and Indo-European philologist.

From 1893, he studied at Marburg University and the University of Freiberg, where he was a pupil of Rudolf Thurneysen. In 1899, he obtained his habilitation at Leipzig University with the thesis Die Komparationssuffixe im Lateinischen (Comparative suffixes of Latin). In 1902, he was named professor of Indo-European linguistics, Sanskrit and classical philology at the University of Basel, and later on in his career, he held professorships in Indo-European linguistics at the University of Rostock from 1909 to 1913, the University of Jena from 1913 to 1924, and the University of Bonn from 1924 to 1926. From 1926 to 1951, he was a professor of comparative linguistics at the Ludwig-Maximilians-Universität München.

He was a member of the Saxon Academy of Sciences (from 1922), Göttingen Academy of Sciences (from 1925), Bavarian Academy of Sciences (from 1927) and Academy of Sciences in Berlin (from 1944).

== Selected works ==
- Handbuch der lateinischen Laut- und Formenlehre. Eine Einführung in das sprachwissenschaftliche Studium des Lateins. Heidelberg 1902, 3rd edition 1914 – Handbook of Latin phonetics and morphology; an introduction to the linguistic study of Latin.
- Griechische Lautstudien. Straßburg 1905 – Greek phonetic studies.
- Die indogermanischen iā- und io-Stämme im Baltischen. Leipzig 1914 – The Indo-European iā- and io-stems in Baltic.
- Sprachgeschichtliche Erläuterungen für den griechischen Unterricht. Laut- und Formenlehre. Leipzig 1917, 4th edition Darmstadt 1961 – Linguistic-historical explanations for teaching Greek; phonology and morphology.
- Vergleichende Syntax der Schulsprachen (Deutsch, Englisch, Französisch, Griechisch, Lateinisch) Mit besonderer Berücksichtigung des Deutschen. Leipzig 1921, 6th edition Darmstadt 1989 – Comparative syntax of school languages (German, English, French, Greek, Latin) with special reference to German.
- Die Aḫḫijavā-Urkunden. Munich 1932. Nachdruck Hildesheim 1975 – The Aḫḫijavā documents.
- Aḫḫijavāfrage und Sprachwissenschaft, Verlag der Bayerischen Akademie der Wissenschaften, Munich, 1934 (Digitalisat)
- Hethiter und Hethitisch. Stuttgart 1947 – Hittites and Hittite.
- Schriften aus dem Nachlass (edited by Bernhard Forssmann) Munich 1977 – Writings from the Nachlass.
