= Lyrcus =

Greek mythological figures

Lyrcus (Ancient Greek: Λύρκος, romanized: Lúrkos) is the name of two Greek mythological figures, one a figure in a 1st-century BC Hellenistic romance by Parthenius of Nicaea, son of phoroneus, the other the eponymous legendary founder of Lyrceia and son of Abas. Stories of both located Lyrcus near Argos; their individual lives intertwine with other historical and mythological figures.

- Lyrcus, son of Phoroneus. He was one of several men sent by Inachus when Io, daughter of King Inachus of Argos, had been captured by brigands to search for her and attempt to find her. Lyrcus failed to find her and gave up on the search mission but he was too much afraid of Inachus to return to Argos, and went instead to Caunus, where he married Hilebia, daughter of King Aegialus (son of Caunus), who, as the story goes, had fallen in love with Lyrcus as soon as she saw him, and by her instant prayers had persuaded her father to betroth her to him; he gave him as dowry a good share of the realm and of the rest of the regal attributes, and accepted him as his son-in-law. So a considerable period of time passed, but Lyrcus and his wife had no children: and accordingly he made a journey to the oracle at Didyma, to ask how he might obtain offspring; and the answer was, that he would beget a child upon the first woman with whom he should have to do after leaving the shrine. At this, he was mighty pleased, and began to hasten on his homeward journey back to his wife, sure that the prediction was going to be fulfilled according to his wish; but on his voyage, when he arrived at Bybastus (a city in Caria), he was entertained by Staphylus, the son of Dionysus, who received him in the most friendly manner and enticed him to much drinking of wine, and then, when his senses were dulled with drunkenness, united him with his own daughter Hemithea, having had previous intimation of what the sentence of the oracle had been, and desiring to have descendants born to her: but actually a bitter strife arose between Rhoeo and Hemithea, the two daughters of Staphylus, as to which should have the guest, because of a great desire for him by both of the daughters. On the next morning, Lyrcus discovered the trap that his host had laid for him, when he saw Hemithea by his side: he was exceedingly angry, and upbraided Staphylus violently for his treacherous conduct; but finally, seeing that there was nothing to be done, he took off his belt and gave it to the girl, bidding her to keep it until their future offspring had come to man’s estate, so that he might possess a token by which he might be recognized, if he should ever come to his father at Caunus: and so he sailed away home. Aegialus, however, when he heard the whole story about the oracle and about Hemithea, banished him from his country; and there was then a war of great length between the partisans of Lyrcus and those of Aegialus: Hilebia was on the side of the former, for she refused to repudiate her husband. In after years, the son of Lyrcus and Hemithea, whose name was Basilus, came, when he was a grown man, to the Caunian land; and Lyrcus, now an old man, recognized him as his son, and made him ruler over his peoples.
- Lyrcus, son of Abas.
