= Memphis (wife of Epaphus) =

Queen in Greek mythology

In Greek mythology, Memphis (Ancient Greek: Μέμφις), daughter of river-god Nilus was the wife to Epaphus, and mother of Libya. She and her husband were the legendary founders of Memphis, which bears her name. Some writers called Epaphus's wife Cassiopeia.

== Argive genealogy ==
Argive genealogy in Greek mythology

Oceanus	Tethys
Inachus	Melia
Zeus	Io	Phoroneus
Epaphus	Memphis
Libya	Poseidon
Achiroë	Belus	Agenor	Telephassa
Danaus	Elephantis	Aegyptus	Cadmus	Cilix	Europa	Phoenix
Mantineus	Hypermnestra	Lynceus	Harmonia	Zeus
Sparta	Lacedaemon	Ocalea	Abas	Polydorus	Agave	Sarpedon	Rhadamanthus
Eurydice	Acrisius	Autonoë	Ino	Minos
Zeus	Danaë	Semele	Zeus
Perseus	Dionysus

Colour key:

Male
Female
Deity
