= Eurydice (daughter of Lacedaemon) =

Mythical Greek queen

In Greek mythology, Eurydice (/jʊəˈrɪdɪsi/; Ancient Greek: Εὐρυδίκη, romanized: Eurudikē, lit. 'wide justice', derived from ευρυς eurys "wide" and δικη dike "justice") was a Spartan princess who later on became the queen of Argos. She is the mother of Danaë, the mother of the Argive hero Perseus.

== Family ==
Eurydice was the daughter of King Lacedaemon and Queen Sparta, the legendary founders of Sparta and thus sister to Amyclas.

Later on, Eurydice married King Acrisius of Argos and became the mother of Danaë who begot the celebrated hero Perseus. Her other daughter was possibly Evarete, wife of Oenomaus, king of Pisa in Elis. In some accounts, the wife of Acrisius was called Aganippe.

== Euripides' Danaë ==
Eurydice's largest role in surviving accounts is in Euripides' fragmentary play, Danaë, an ancient tragedy dealing with the aftermath of Acrisius' prophecy that his daughter should remain a virgin, or her son would kill Acrisius, resulting in Acrisius imprisoning his daughter in a chamber. Zeus, in the form of gold, visited and impregnated the princess. Extant fragments do not reveal what the queen's name in Euripides was, but focus on Acrisius and the joy of having children, leading to the hypothesis that Danaë lied to her father about the newborn Perseus being his own son, a conspiracy which necessarily had to include the queen, for she knew she had not been pregnant.

An ancient summary of the play was published for the first time in 2016, confirming the theory that Eurydice discovered Danaë's situation, faked a pregnancy and when the girl gave birth, she presented Perseus as her and Acrisius' son. Eurydice's exact motivation is not clear, be it love for her daughter or the wish to avoid the scandal of an unmarried maiden having a child outside wedlock. Following Acrisius' joy at having a male heir at last, Eurydice asked her husband to finally free Danaë, to which Acrisius agreed. However, the servant that led Danaë from her chamber discovered evidence of a childbirth having taken place there, and notified Acrisius. Like in the other versions of Danaë's tale, Acrisius shut mother and son into a chest and threw it into the sea. It is not clear what punishment he imposed on Eurydice, if any at all; it is possible Acrisius thought Danaë and Perseus' fates was enough punishment for her.

== Argive genealogy ==
Argive genealogy in Greek mythology

Oceanus	Tethys
Inachus	Melia
Zeus	Io	Phoroneus
Epaphus	Memphis
Libya	Poseidon
Achiroë	Belus	Agenor	Telephassa
Danaus	Elephantis	Aegyptus	Cadmus	Cilix	Europa	Phoenix
Mantineus	Hypermnestra	Lynceus	Harmonia	Zeus
Sparta	Lacedaemon	Ocalea	Abas	Polydorus	Agave	Sarpedon	Rhadamanthus
Eurydice	Acrisius	Autonoë	Ino	Minos
Zeus	Danaë	Semele	Zeus
Perseus	Dionysus

Colour key:

Male
Female
Deity
