= Autonoë (daughter of Cadmus) =

Theban Princess

- Princess of Thebes
- Member of the Theban Royal Family
- Abode: Thebes

Genealogy
- Parents: Cadmus and Harmonia
- Siblings: Agave, Ino, Semele and Polydorus
- Consort: Aristaeus
- Children: Actaeon

In Greek mythology, Autonoë (/ɔːˈtɒnoʊ.iː/; Ancient Greek: Αὐτονόη) was a Theban princess as the eldest daughter of Cadmus, founder of Thebes in Boeotia, and the goddess Harmonia. She was the wife of Aristaeus and mother of Actaeon and possibly Macris.

== Mythology ==
=== Euripides' account ===
In Euripides' play, The Bacchae, she and her sisters were driven into a bacchic frenzy by the god Dionysus (her nephew) when Pentheus, the king of Thebes, refused to allow his worship in the city. When Pentheus came to spy on their revels, Agave, the mother of Pentheus and Autonoë's sister, spotted him in a tree. They tore him to pieces in their Bacchic fury. The murder of Pentheus was brought by Dionysus as retribution for Pentheus's lack of piety for the gods.

Actaeon, the son of Autonoë, was eaten by his own hounds as punishment for glimpsing Artemis naked. At last, grief and sadness at the lamentable fate of the house of her father induced Autonoe to quit Thebes to go to Ereneia, a village of the Megarians, where she died.

=== Oppian's account ===
According to Oppian, Autonoe along with her sisters Ino and Agave became the nurses of the infant Dionysus, son of Semele their sister.

For Ino, scion of Agenor, reared the infant Bacchus and first gave her breast to the son of Zeus, and Autonoe likewise and Agave joined in nursing him, but not in the baleful halls of Athamas, but on the mountain which at that time men called by the name of the Thigh (Μηρός). For greatly fearing the mighty spouse of Zeus and dreading the tyrant Pentheus, son of Echion, they laid the holy child in a coffer of pine and covered it with fawn-skins and wreathed it with clusters of the vine, in a grotto where round the child they danced the mystic dance and beat drums and clashed cymbals in their hands, to veil the cries of the infant. It was around that hidden ark that they first showed forth their mysteries, and with them the Aonian women secretly took paint rites. And they arrayed a gathering of their faithful companions to journey from that mountain out of the Boeotian land. For now, now was it fated that a land, which before was wild, should cultivate the vine at the instance of Dionysus who delivers from sorrow. Then the holy choir took up secret coffer and wreathed it and set it on the back of an ass. And they came unto the shores of the Euripus, where they found a seafaring old man with his sons, and all together they besought the fishermen that they might cross the water in their boats. Then the old man had compassion on them and received on board the holy women. And lo! on the benches of his boat flowered the lush bindweed and blooming vine and ivy wreathed the stern. Now would the fishermen, cowering in god-sent terror, have dived into the sea, but ere that the boat came to land. And to Euboea the women came, carrying the god, and to the abode of Aristaeus, who dwelt in a cave on the top of a mountain at Caryae and who instructed the life of country-dwelling men in countless things; he was the first to establish a flock of sheep; he first pressed the fruit of the oily wild olive, first curdled milk with rennet, and brought the gentle bees from the oak and shut them up in hives. He at that time received the infant Dionysus from coffer of Ino and reared him in his cave and nursed him with the help of the Dryads and the Nymphs that have the bees in their keeping and the maidens of Euboea and the Aonian women.

=== Nonnus' account ===
In Nonnus, Dionysiaca 5.212, the marriage of Aristaeus and Autonoë and the fate of their son Actaeon was described in the following lines:

Kadmos (Cadmus) [king of Thebes] now chose husbands for his daughters, and gave them over in four successive bridals, settling their weddings one by one. First Aristaios (Aristaeus) laden with gifts, he of the herds and he of the wilds, as he was named, the flood of allwise Apollon and Kyrene (Cyrene) so ready with her hands, wedded Autonoe according to the rules of lawful marriage. Agenorides (Kadmos son of Agenor) did not refuse his daughter to a good son well acquainted with the art of feeding many; nay, he gave her to a very clever husband, a lifesaving son of Apollon, after he head calmed the pestilential star of fiery Maira [Sirius the Dog Star] by the life-preserving breezes of heaven-sent [Etesian] winds. The wedding-feast also was very rich, since he gave the unyoked maid oxen for her treasure, he gave goats, he gave mountain-bred flocks; many a line of burden-bearers was forced to lift the load of great jars full of olive-oil, his marriage gifts, much travail of the clever honeybee he brought, in the riddled comb her masterpiece . . . [the blessings that Aristaios conferred on man follow, see the Blessings of Aristaios below.]
This was he, the Keian (Cean) son of Phoibos (Phoebus), whom Eros (Love) escorted to the Aonian wedding. All the city [of Thebes] wreathed in garlands was busy about the cattle-sacrifice, and the straighcut streets were all busy dancing. Before the gates of the bridal chamber the people twirled their reeling legs for the wedding; the women struck up a lovely sounding noise of melody, the Aionian hoboys tootled with the bridal pipes.
Afterwards from the bed of Aristaios and Autonoe, arose Aktaion (Actaeon). His passion was for the rocks; and having in him the blood of the Hunter. . . [But he once came across Artemis bathing naked, was transformed into a stag and torn apart by his own hounds.]
Pheme (Rumour) self born had flown from the hills to Autonoe, proclaiming her son's [Aktaion's] fate torn to pieces by his dogs . . . Old Kadmos shore off his hoary hair, Harmonia cried aloud; the whole house resounded heavy booming with the noise of women wailing in concert. Autonoe along with Aristaios her husband went in search of the scattered remains of the dead. She saw her son, but knew him not; she beheld the shape of a dappled deer and saw no aspect of a man. Often she passed the bones of a fawn unrecognized, lying on the ground, and did not understand; for her boy was dead, and she looked to find him in human shape . . . Passing over the forest ridges with wandering feet, she trod the rough back of the rugged hill, unshod, with loosened robe, and returned home form the mountain ranging task; grieving for her unsuccessful cares she fell asleep at last beside her husband, unhappy father! Both were haunted by shadowy dreams, their eyes glimpsing the wing of a nightingale sleep.
The young man's ghost stood by his disconsolate father, wearing the shadowy form of a dappled stag; but from his eyelids he poured tears of understanding and spoke with a human voice : ‘You sleep, my father, and you know not my fate. Wake, and recognise my unknown changeling looks; wake, and embrace the horn of a stag you love . . . [Aktaion tells his father the circumstances of his death and requests proper burial.] I heard that Phoibos, the Archeress's brother, slept with Kyrene and begat my father, and I thought to draw Artemis to marriage in the family . . .
So spoke the dream the intelligent pricket, and without warning it was flown and gone. Autonoe's husband leapt up, and threw off the wing of this revealing sleep. He aroused his wife much disturbed, and described her boy's strong-horned animal form, and recounted the story which the intelligent fawn had told. Then there was more lamentation.

== Genealogy ==
Argive genealogy in Greek mythology

Oceanus	Tethys
Inachus	Melia
Zeus	Io	Phoroneus
Epaphus	Memphis
Libya	Poseidon
Achiroë	Belus	Agenor	Telephassa
Danaus	Elephantis	Aegyptus	Cadmus	Cilix	Europa	Phoenix
Mantineus	Hypermnestra	Lynceus	Harmonia	Zeus
Sparta	Lacedaemon	Ocalea	Abas	Polydorus	Agave	Sarpedon	Rhadamanthus
Eurydice	Acrisius	Autonoë	Ino	Minos
Zeus	Danaë	Semele	Zeus
Perseus	Dionysus

Colour key:

Male
Female
Deity

Royal House of Thebes
- Solid lines indicate descendants.
- Dashed lines indicate marriages.
- Dotted lines indicate extra-marital relationships or adoptions.
- Kings of Thebes are numbered with bold names and a light purple background.
  - Joint rules are indicated by a number and lowercase letter, for example, 5a. Amphion shared the throne with 5b. Zethus.
- Regents of Thebes are alphanumbered (format AN) with bold names and a light red background.
  - The number N refers to the regency preceding the reign of the N^{th} king. Generally this means the regent served the N^{th} king but not always, as Creon (A9) was serving as regent to Laodamas (the 10th King) when he was slain by Lycus II (the usurping 9th king).
  - The letter A refers to the regency sequence. "A" is the first regent, "B" is the second, etc.
- Deities have a yellow background color.

Harmonia	1. Cadmus	Polyxo	A4. Nycteus (Regent)	Dirce	B4 & A6. Lycus (Regent)
Zeus	Zeus
Ino	Agave	Echion	3. Polydorus	Nycteis	Antiope
Semele	Autonoë
Dionysus	2. Pentheus	Epeiros	4. Labdacus	5a. Amphion	5b. Zethus
Oclasus
Menoeceus
Eurydice	A7, A8 & A9. Creon (Regent)	Jocasta	6. Laius	Merope	Polybus
Hipponome	Alcaeus
Zeus
Alcmene	Amphitryon	Perimede	7. Oedipus
Megara	Heracles	Iphicles	Anaxo
Henioche	Megareus	Haemon	Antigone	8b. Eteocles	Argea	8a. Polynices
Pyrrha	Lycomedes	Ismene	9. Lycus II
A12. Peneleos (Regent)	10. Laodamas	Demonassa	11. Thersander
Opheltes	12. Tisamenus
14. Damasichthon	13. Autesion
15. Ptolemy	Theras	Argeia	Aristodemus
16. Xanthos	Eurysthenes	Procles
