= Achiroe =

Daughter of Nilus in Greek mythology

- Member of the Argive family
- Abode: River Nile in Egypt

Genealogy
- Parents: Nilus
- Siblings: Memphis, Telephassa, Chione, Caliadne (possibly), Polyxo (possibly)
- Consort: Belus
- Offspring: Danaus, Aegyptus, Cepheus, Phineus

Achiroë (/əˈkɪroʊi/; Ancient Greek: Ἀχιρόη [akʰiróɛː]), Anchirrhoë (Ἀγχιρρόη), or Anchinoë (Ἀγχινόη), which is perhaps a mistake for Anchiroë, was in Greek mythology a daughter of the river-god Nilus. She was the wife of King Belus of Egypt, by whom she became the mother of Aegyptus and Danaus, and, according to some accounts, Cepheus, and Phineus.

Otherwise, the possible mother of these children and spouse of Belus was called Side, eponym of Sidon in Phoenicia.

== Mythology ==
Anchinoe was a minor figure in Greek accounts and only mentioned by Apollodorus in his Bibliotheca:

“But Belus remained in Egypt, reigned over the country, and married Anchinoe, daughter of Nile, by whom he had twin sons, Egyptus and Danaus, but according to Euripides, he had also Cepheus and Phineus.”

== Argive genealogy ==
Argive genealogy in Greek mythology

Oceanus	Tethys
Inachus	Melia
Zeus	Io	Phoroneus
Epaphus	Memphis
Libya	Poseidon
Achiroë	Belus	Agenor	Telephassa
Danaus	Elephantis	Aegyptus	Cadmus	Cilix	Europa	Phoenix
Mantineus	Hypermnestra	Lynceus	Harmonia	Zeus
Sparta	Lacedaemon	Ocalea	Abas	Polydorus	Agave	Sarpedon	Rhadamanthus
Eurydice	Acrisius	Autonoë	Ino	Minos
Zeus	Danaë	Semele	Zeus
Perseus	Dionysus

Colour key:

Male
Female
Deity
