= Epaphus =

Figure in Greek mythology

In Greek mythology, Epaphus (/ˈɛpəfəs/; Ancient Greek: Ἔπαφος, romanized: Épaphos, lit. 'touch' or 'he who was touched'), also called Apis or Munantius was a son of Zeus and king of Egypt.

== Family ==
Epaphus mother was Io and thus, Ceroessa's brother. With his wife, Memphis (or according to others, Cassiopeia), he had one daughter, Libya while some accounts added another one who bore the name Lysianassa. These daughters later became mothers of Poseidon's sons, Belus, Agenor and possibly, Lelex with the former while Busiris was born to the latter. Through these daughters, Epaphus was the ancestor of the "dark Libyans, and high-souled Aethiopians, and the Underground-folk and feeble Pygmies".

In one account, Epaphus had a son, Dorus, who fathered Pygmaeus, ancestor of the Pygmies. Otherwise, this tribe of diminutive men was instead born from Epaphus and Gaea (Earth).

== Mythology ==
=== Birth ===
The name/word Epaphus means "Touch". This refers to the manner in which he was conceived, by the touch of Zeus's hand. He was born in Euboea, in the cave Boösaule according to Strabo or according to others, in Egypt, on the river Nile, after the long wanderings of his mother. He was then concealed by the Curetes, by the request of Hera, but Io sought and afterward found him in Syria where he was nursed by the wife of the king of Byblus.

=== Phaethon ===
Epaphus was also a contemporary and the rival of Phaethon, son of Helios and Clymene. He criticized his heraldry saying, "Poor, demented fellow, what will you not credit if your mother speaks, you are so puffed up with the fond conceit of your imagined sire, the Lord of Day." This prompted Phaethon to undertake his fateful journey in his father's chariot of the sun.

=== Reign and death ===
Epaphus is regarded in the myths as the founder of Memphis, Egypt. Hera being envious that her husband's bastard ruled such a great kingdom, saw to it that Epaphus should be killed while hunting.

David Rohl identifies Epaphus with the Hyksos pharaoh Apophis though his chronology has been rejected by most Egyptologists.

== Argive genealogy ==
Argive genealogy in Greek mythology

Oceanus | Tethys
Inachus | Melia
Zeus | Io | Phoroneus
Epaphus | Memphis
Libya | Poseidon
Achiroë | Belus | Agenor | Telephassa
Danaus | Elephantis | Aegyptus | Cadmus | Cilix | Europa | Phoenix
Mantineus | Hypermnestra | Lynceus | Harmonia | Zeus
Sparta | Lacedaemon | Ocalea | Abas | Polydorus | Agave | Sarpedon | Rhadamanthus
Eurydice | Acrisius | Autonoë | Ino | Minos
Zeus | Danaë | Semele | Zeus
Perseus | Dionysus

Colour key:

Male
Female
Deity
