= Phoenix (son of Agenor) =

Brother of Europa in Ancient Greek mythology

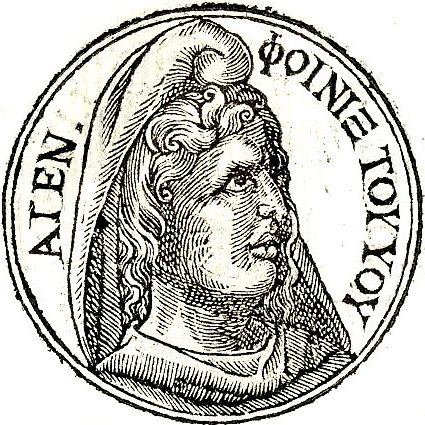
Phoenix from Guillaume Rouillé's Promptuarii Iconum Insigniorum

In Greek mythology, Phoenix or Phoinix (Ancient Greek: Φοῖνιξ; gen.: Φοίνικος, romanized: Phoinix, lit. 'sun-red') was the eponym of Phoenicia who together with his brothers were tasked to find their abducted sister Europa.

== Family ==
Phoenix was a son of King Agenor of Tyre by either Telephassa, Argiope, Antiope, Damno or Tyro. He was the brother of Europa, Cadmus, Cilix, Syros, Isaia and Melia.

In some accounts, Phoenix's father was called King Belus of Egypt and sibling to Agenor, Phineus, Aegyptus, Danaus and Ninus. In the latter's version of the myth, Phoenix' mother could be identified as Achiroe, naiad daughter of the river-god Nilus.

Phoenix was believed to have fathered a number of children with different women. By Cassiopeia, Phoenix had a daughter, Carme, and three sons: Cilix, Phineus, and Doryclus, as well as a stepson Atymnius, whose natural father was Zeus; by Alphesiboea, he had Adonis. Phoenix was also credited as the father of Cepheus, king of Ethiopia, whose wife was another Cassiopeia.

According to early accounts, Europa was not Phoenix's sister, but his daughter, while Cadmus was identified as his son. Otherwise, Europa was called one of his two daughters by Perimede, daughter of Oeneus, the other one being Astypalaea; she was also included on the list of Phoenix's children by Telephe, daughter of Epimedusa, her siblings in this case being Peirus and Astypale (apparently identical to the aforementioned Astypalaea).

Telephe was probably the same as Telephassa, whom Moschus called Phoenix's wife and not his mother. In another account, his children were Cadmus, Europa and Thasus.

== Mythology ==
When Europa was carried off by Zeus, her three brothers were sent out by Agenor to find her, but the search was unsuccessful. Phoenix eventually settled in a country in Asia or Africa, which he named Phoenicia after himself. He was said to have founded Bithynia which was previously named Mariandyna.

Malalas recounted the following about Phoenix and Heracles the Tyrian:

"Herakles the philosopher, called the Tyrian, lived in the reign of King Phoenix. It was he who discovered the purple-shell. He was wandering on the coastal part of Tyre city when he saw a shepherd dog eating the so-called purple-shell, which is a small maritime species like a sea snail. The shepherd thought the dog was bleeding, and took a clump of sheep’s wool and wiped off what was coming out of the dog’s mouth, and it dyed the wool. Herakles noticed that it wasn’t blood but the virtue of a strange dye, and wondered at it. Recognizing that the dye deposited on the wool came from the purple-shell, and having taken the wool from the shepherd as a great gift, he brought it to Phoenix, the King of Tyre. He too was surprised by the sight of the strange color of the dye. Admiring his discovery, he ordered that wool be dyed from this purple-shell dye and become a royal mantle for him. He was the first to wear this purple mantle, and everyone marveled at his royal raiment, as a foreign spectacle. From then, King Phoenix commanded that no one under his rule dare to wear such virtuous clothing on land or sea, except himself and those who ruled Phoenicia after him, so that they would recognize the King in the army and the crowd from his marvelous and strange clothing."

== Genealogical table ==
Comparative table of Phoenix's family
Relation	Names	Sources																											
Relation	Names	Hes.		Hom.		Pher.	Hel.	Bac.	Sch. on		Pala.	Sch. on	Mos.	Ps. Scy.	Con.	Apd.	Dic.	Hyg.		Pau.	Ant.	Sol.	Non.		Mal.	Sud.	Tzet.		St. Jer.
Relation	Names	Hes.		Ili.	Sch.	Pher.	Hel.	Bac.	Eurip.		Pala.	Apl.	Mos.	Ps. Scy.	Con.	Apd.	Dic.	Hyg.		Pau.	Ant.	Sol.	Non.		Mal.	Sud.	Tzet.		St. Jer.
Parents	Agenor	✓							✓		✓						✓				✓		✓			✓			
Parents	Agenor and Damno					✓																							
Parents	Agenor and Telephassa															✓													
Parents	Agenor and Argiope																	✓											
Parents	Agenor and Tyro																								✓				
Parents	Agenor and Antiope																											✓	
Parents	Belus																							✓					
Parents	Belus and Achiroe																										✓		
Siblings	Europa															✓		✓					✓		✓				
Siblings	Cadmus										✓					✓		✓					✓		✓			✓	
Siblings	Cilix								✓							✓		✓							✓			✓	
Siblings	Thasus								✓														✓						
Siblings	Phineus II																✓		✓				✓						
Siblings	Cepheus																						✓						
Siblings	Isaea					✓						✓																	
Siblings	Melia					✓						✓																	
Siblings	Taygete																✓												
Siblings	Syros																								✓				
Siblings	Agenor																							✓			✓		
Siblings	Aegyptus																							✓			✓		
Siblings	Danaus																							✓			✓		
Siblings	Phineus I																							✓			✓		
Siblings	Ninus																										✓		
Wife	Cassiopeia	✓				✓															✓								
Wife	Telephassa									✓			✓																
Wife	Alphesiboea		✓													✓													
Wife	Perimede																			✓									
Children	Europa	✓		✓	✓		✓	✓		✓	✓		✓		✓	✓	✓			✓									✓
Children	Cadmus				✓		✓								✓														
Children	Phineus	✓				✓	✓					✓		✓															
Children	Cilix					✓	✓															✓							
Children	Doryclus					✓	✓																						
Children	Astypale									✓								✓		✓									
Children	Phoenice									✓																			
Children	Peirus									✓																			
Children	Thasus														✓														
Children	Adonis		✓													✓													
Children	Cepheus																	✓											
Children	Carme																				✓								

== Argive family tree ==
Argive genealogy in Greek mythology

Oceanus	Tethys
Inachus	Melia
Zeus	Io	Phoroneus
Epaphus	Memphis
Libya	Poseidon
Achiroë	Belus	Agenor	Telephassa
Danaus	Elephantis	Aegyptus	Cadmus	Cilix	Europa	Phoenix
Mantineus	Hypermnestra	Lynceus	Harmonia	Zeus
Sparta	Lacedaemon	Ocalea	Abas	Polydorus	Agave	Sarpedon	Rhadamanthus
Eurydice	Acrisius	Autonoë	Ino	Minos
Zeus	Danaë	Semele	Zeus
Perseus	Dionysus

Colour key:

Male
Female
Deity
