= Cilix =

Phoenician prince in Greek mythology

Cilix (/ˈsɪlɪks/; Ancient Greek: Κίλιξ Kílix) was, according to Greek mythology, a Phoenician prince and the son of King Agenor and Telephassa or Argiope.

== Etymology ==
In her book Who's Who in Classical Mythology, author Adrian Room describes the name's etymology: "we can perhaps see in his name a blend of ceras, 'horn' and helix, 'twisted', or even a link with cyllos, 'crooked'". This is referring to the horns of Zeus in the form of a white bull, who carried off Cilix's sister Europa to the coast of Crete. Cilicia's etymology is broken up into two parts according to the two parts of its terrain. Cilicia Trachea is "rugged Cilicia", in Greek Κιλικία Τραχεῖα; it is also the Assyrian Hilakku, classical "Cilicia". Cilicia Pedias is "flat Cilicia", in Ancient Greek: Κιλικία Πεδιάς, and in Assyrian Quwê.

== Family ==
Cilix was the son of King Agenor and Telephassa or Argiope, and the brother of Cadmus, Phoenix and Europa. Through a union with an unknown woman, he was the father of Princess Thebe; Thebe was the wife of Corybas, the son of Iasion and Cybele.

While some sources claim that Thasus is related to Cilix, as a brother or nephew, Thasus' genealogy is not fully agreed upon. Hawthorne's tale specifically calls Thasus a "playfellow", and mentions no blood relation to Agenor. There is little information about this, and the only widely agreed on information is that Thasus founded the town of Thasos.

== Mythology ==
When Europa was carried off by Zeus, Agenor sent his three sons out to find her, telling them not to return until they find her. The search was unsuccessful. Cilix eventually settled down in Asia Minor. The land was called Cilicia after him. Cilix's son, Thasus (who might have also been a son of Poseidon), who accompanied his uncle Cadmus in his journey. Thasus was said to become king of island Thasos.

== Tanglewood Tales ==
Author Nathaniel Hawthorne's novel Tanglewood Tales features Cilix in the story "Dragon's Teeth". The story is a re-telling of Europa's disappearance and her family's search for her, aimed towards a younger audience. After the party leaves Phoenix, Cilix seemed to be more tormented by it than the rest of them. He tells the party that "methinks we are like people in a dream"; he states that they had been looking for the missing Europa for so long that not only can he not remember what she looks or sounds like, but questions whether or not she existed in the first place. Cilix states that he has "resolved to take up my abode here", and entreats Thasus, Cadmus, and Telephassa to join him. They refuse, but help him build a habitation. Other settlers joined him and built their own living spaces, and this land turned into Cilicia. Cilix's small abode turned into a marble palace; after the inhabitants found out he was a king's son, they decided to make him king of the land. He appeared on the balcony every noontide, "in a long purple robe, and with a jeweled crown upon his head". One of his first acts of his new government was to send out an exhibition to visit the principal kingdoms of the earth to look for Europa. In Hawthorne's last substantial mention of Cilix in the story, he remarks on Cilix's remorse, stating "It is, therefore, plain to my mind, that Cilix secretly blamed himself for giving up the search for Europa, as long as he was able to put one foot before the other".

== Cilicia ==
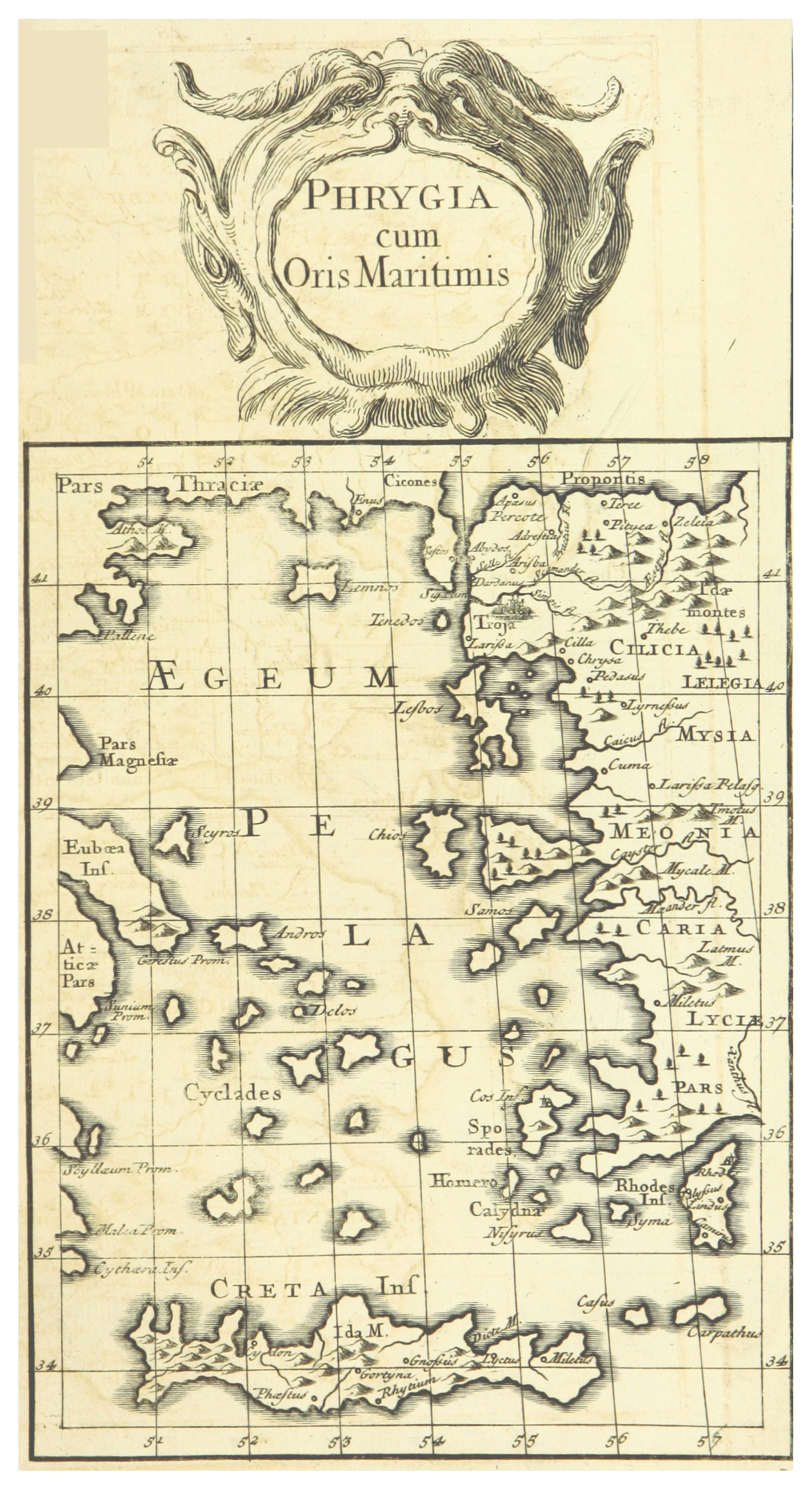
Aegean Cilicia or Mysian Cilicia, South of Mt. İda

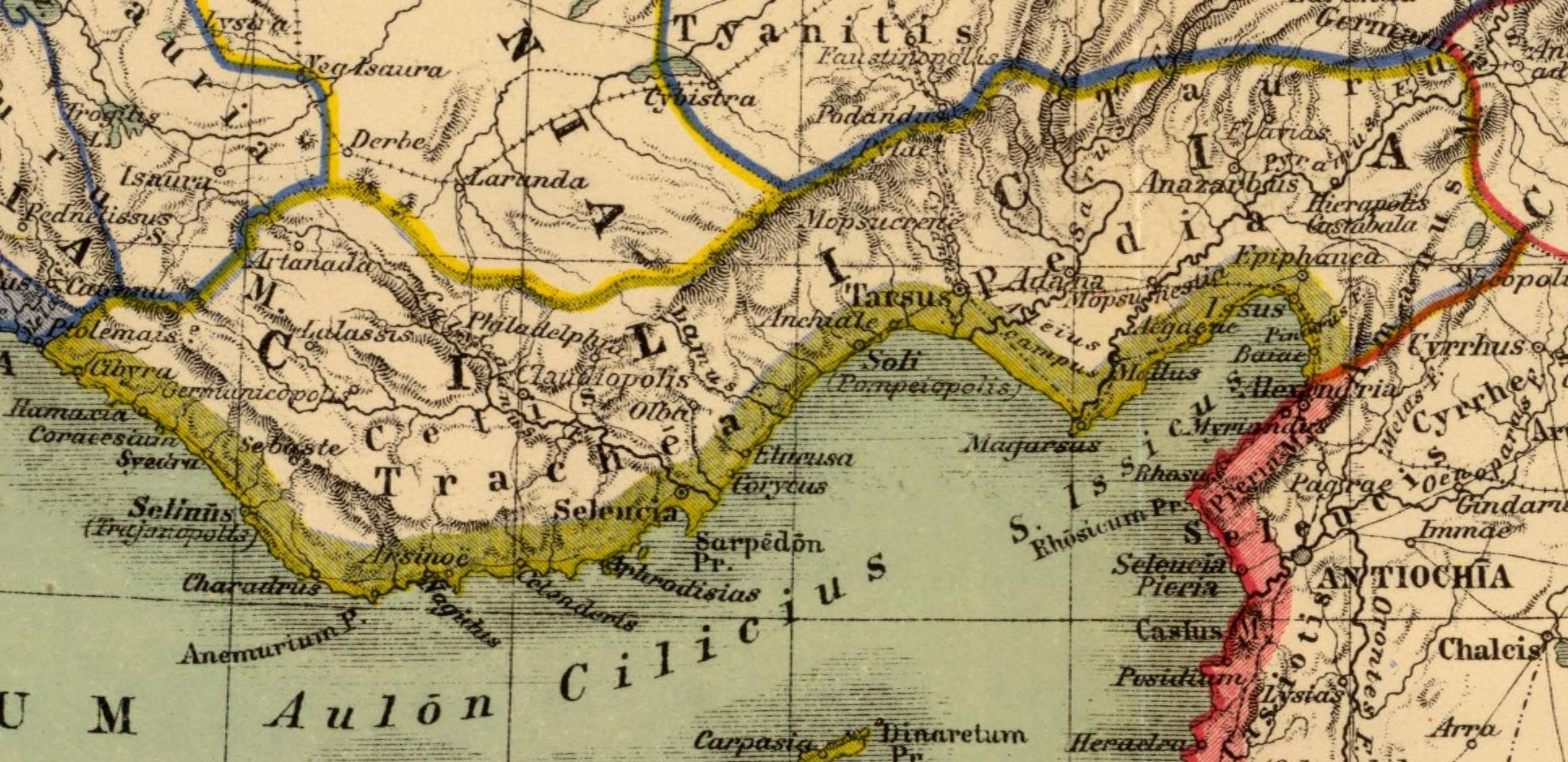
Cilicia, North Levant

=== Levantine Cilicia ===
Cilicia, mythically, quickly grew from Cilix's home to a full province. Historically, Cilicia was a part of the ancient Roman Empire on the southeast portion of Asia Minor. It was settled from the Neolithic period onwards. The terrain, mostly rugged, is bounded by the Mediterranean Sea on the south and mountains on to the north and east. Cilicia was a neighbor of Lycia. The Cilicians and Lycians did not have good character according to the Greeks, and they fought each other as well as Greeks passing on the coast of the Mediterranean often. The land has biblical influences as well. Its capital, Tarsus, is the famous birthplace of Paul the Apostle. When news of Christianity reached Cilicia, Paul came and founded churches on the land. There are numerous mention of Cilicia in the Bible, particularly in Acts 6-23. Acts 15:41 describes Paul the Apostle coming back to Cilicia, saying "And he went through Syria and Cilicia, blessing the churches". Paul also passed by Cilicia on his sea voyage to Rome as a prisoner. In Martin P. Nilsson's book The Mycenean Origin of Greek Mythology, Nilsson mentions Cilicia and Lycia from an archaeological standpoint. The lands are known now more from a mythical rather than a physical way. Not many artifacts have been found there, but Nilsson refers to a Einar Gjerstad who had been to the land. He writes "Unhappily this country is almost unknown archaeologically. But Dr. Gjerstad who visited Cilicia recently informs me that there is evidence of Mycenean colonization in this district". But as The Mycenean Origin of Greek Mythology was published in 1932, more artifacts may have been found.

=== Aegean Cilicia ===
The area is coastal plain in the East of Adramytteion Gulf, between Troas and Aeolis, Aegean cost of Mysia. Similar with Cilix's brother Cadmus who built a city name Thebes in Beotia; there is a city called Thebe in this region. The region is much more close to Greek island Thasos. Pseudo-Apollodoros stated that Cilix settled near Phoenicia around the Pyramus, meaning in Levantine Cilicia.

== Argive genealogy ==
Argive genealogy in Greek mythology

Colour key:

Male
Female
Deity

Oceanus	Tethys
Inachus	Melia
Io	Zeus	Phoroneus
Epaphus	Memphis
Libya	Poseidon
Belus	Achiroë	Agenor	Telephassa
Danaus	Elephantis	Aegyptus	Cadmus	Harmonia	Cilix	Europa	Zeus	Phoenix	Perimede
Hypermnestra	Lynceus	Mantineus	Polydorus	Agave	Thebe	Sarpedon	Rhadamanthus	Astypalaea	Poseidon
Abas	Ocalea	Sparta	Lacedaemon	Autonoë	Ino	Ida	Minos	Ancaeus	Eurypylus	Clytie
Acrisius	Eurydice	Semele	Zeus	Lycastus	Chalciope	Heracles
Danaë	Zeus	Dionysus	Thessalus
Perseus	Andromeda
Electryon	Anaxo
Alcmene	Zeus
Heracles

== See also ==
- List of mortals in Greek mythology
