= Belus (Egyptian) =

Son of Poseidon in Greek mythology

In Greek mythology, Belus (Ancient Greek: Βῆλος, romanized: Bêlos) was a king of Egypt and father of Aegyptus and Danaus and (usually) brother to Agenor. The wife of Belus has been named as Achiroe or Side (eponym of the Phoenician city of Sidon).

== Family ==
Belus was the son of Poseidon and Libya or of Zeus and Lybee (i.e. Libya). He may also be Busiris, son of Libya, ruler of Egypt, killed by Heracles, although Heracles was born many generations after Belus since he was a great-grandchild of Perseus; see Argive genealogy below.

Apollodorus also claims that Agenor was Belus's twin brother. Belus ruled in Egypt, and Agenor ruled over Sidon and Tyre in Phoenicia. The wife of Belus has been named as Achiroe, daughter of the river-god Nilus. Her sons Aegyptus and Danaus were twins. Later Aegyptus ruled over Egypt and Arabia, and Danaus ruled over Libya. Apollodorus says that it was Euripides who added Cepheus and Phineus as additional sons of Belus.

In the Hesiodic Catalogue of Women, Belus was also the father of a daughter named Thronia on whom Hermaon, i.e. Hermes, fathered Arabus, presumably the eponym of Arabia.

According to Pherecydes of Athens, Belus also had a daughter named Damno who married Agenor (Belus's brother, her uncle) and bore to him Phoenix and two daughters named Isaie, and Melia, these becoming wives respectively to sons of Belus (their cousins) Aegyptus and Danaus. Yet another source says that the daughter of Belus who married Agenor was named Antiope.

Some sources make Belus the father of Lamia while Antoninus mentions him as the father of Thias (father of Smyrna) by the nymph Orithyia.

Nonnus makes Belus the father of five sons, namely Phineus, Phoenix, Agenor (identified as the father of Cadmus), Aegyptus, and Danaus, though Nonnus elsewhere makes Phineus to be Cadmus's brother. Nonnus has Cadmus identify Belus as "the Libyan Zeus" and refer to the "new voice of Zeus Asbystes", meaning the oracle of Zeus Ammon at Asbystes.

Comparative table of Belus's family
Relation	Names	Sources													
Relation	Names	Hesiod	Pher.	Aeschylus	Euripides	Herodotus	Strabo	Apollodorus	Diodorus	Hyginus	Pausanias	Antoninus	Nonnus	Tzetzes	Unknown
Relation	Names	Ehoiai	Pher.												
Parents	Poseidon and Libya							✓	✓	✓			✓		
Parents	Libya										✓				
Wife	Achiroe							✓							
Wife	Orithyia											✓			
Wife	Side														✓
Children	Thronia	✓					✓								
Children	Damno		✓												
Children	Aegyptus			✓	✓			✓		✓	✓		✓	✓	
Children	Danaus			✓	✓			✓		✓			✓	✓	
Children	Cepheus				✓	✓		✓							
Children	Phineus				✓			✓					✓	✓	
Children	Antiope				✓									✓	
Children	Thias											✓			
Children	Phoenix												✓	✓	
Children	Agenor												✓	✓	
Children	Ninus													✓	

== Mythology ==
Diodorus Siculus claims that Belus founded a colony on the river Euphrates, and appointed the priests-astrologers whom the Babylonians call Chaldeans who like the priests of Egypt are exempt from taxation and other service to the state.

According to Pausanias, Belus founded a temple of Heracles in Babylon. Meanwhile, it was said that Egyptians initially fought with clubs but later on Belus invented the use of sword in fighting. The word bellum, "war," is named from this.

== Belus and Bel Marduk ==
Pausanias wrote:

"<Ruler> Manticlus founded the temple of Heracles for the Messenians; the temple of the god is outside the walls and he is called Heracles Manticlus, just as Ammon in Libya and Belus in Babylon are named, the latter from an Egyptian, Belus the son of Libya, Ammon from the shepherd-founder. Thus the exiled Messenians reached the end of their wanderings."

This supposed connection between Belus of Egypt and Zeus Belus (the god Marduk) is likely to be more learned speculation than genuine tradition. Pausanias seems to know nothing of supposed connection between Belus son of Libya and Zeus Ammon that Nonnus will later put forth as presented just above.

== Belus and Ba'al ==
Modern writers suppose a possible connection between Belus and one or another god who bore the common northwest Semitic title Ba'al. According to some sources, Belus was the son of Poseidon by Libya. Bel is associated with Babylon and Assyria, but Aegean Greeks had a distant relations with that area, in contrast they had trading relationships with north Canaanites of Syria, Ugarit and Levantine Sidon and Tyros, cities that are mentioned in Greek myths about Belos, and his name is an echo of the Canaanite god Baal (Redfield, 1989, pp. 28 & 30–31), which in Akkadian Babylonian scripts is replaced with Enlil, both meaning "lord", and may be connected with Marduk, but the most probable connection in ancient Levantine/Canaanite mythology is Baal Hadad, a fertility god, whose attributes are lightning, rainstorms and the forces of nature.

Argive genealogy in Greek mythology

Oceanus	Tethys
Inachus	Melia
Zeus	Io	Phoroneus
Epaphus	Memphis
Libya	Poseidon
Achiroë	Belus	Agenor	Telephassa
Danaus	Elephantis	Aegyptus	Cadmus	Cilix	Europa	Phoenix
Mantineus	Hypermnestra	Lynceus	Harmonia	Zeus
Sparta	Lacedaemon	Ocalea	Abas	Polydorus	Agave	Sarpedon	Rhadamanthus
Eurydice	Acrisius	Autonoë	Ino	Minos
Zeus	Danaë	Semele	Zeus
Perseus	Dionysus

Colour key:

Male
Female
Deity
