= Hypermnestra =

Daughter of Danaus in Greek mythology

- Member of the 50 Danaids
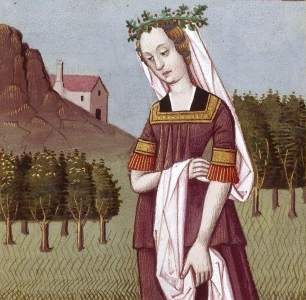
- An image of Hypermnestra at the Bibliothèque Nationale de Francais
- Abode: Libya, later Argos

Genealogy
- Parents: Danaus (father); Elephantis or Melia (mother)
- Spouse: Lynceus
- Children: Abas

In Greek mythology, Hypermnestra (Ancient Greek: Ὑπερμνήστρα, romanized: Hypermnēstra, lit. 'exceedingly memorable' or 'strong memory') was by birth a Libyan princess and by marriage a queen of Argos. She is a daughter of King Danaus, and one of the 50 Danaids. Hypermnestra is most notable for being the only Danaid that betrayed her father and refused to kill her husband Lynceus, the future king of Argos.

== Family ==
Hypermnestra was one of two daughters born of King Danaus of Libya and Elephantis, with her only full sister being Gorgophone, as the rest of the 48 Danaids were begotten by other women. Danaus was the son of King Belus of Egypt and either the naiad Archiroe, daughter of the river god Nilus, or Side, the namesake of Sidon.

In other versions of the myth, all of the Danaids were born of Melia, daughter of King Agenor of Tyre.

== Mythology ==
Hypermnestra's father, King Danaus of Libya had a twin brother Aegyptus, an Egyptian king. Both men fathered 50 children, with Danaus having 50 daughters (the Danaids) and Aegyptus having 50 sons. Aegyptus proposed marriages between all their children, but Danaus refused and fled with his family to Argos, as an oracle once foretold that he would die by the hand of his son-in-law. King Pelasgus of Argos surrendered the city to Danaus, and he became king.

Aegyptus was enraged by his brother's betrayal. He organized an army led by all his sons, and sent them to Argos with the command that they should not return until either Danaus was dead or he had consented to let the brothers marry the Danaids. Danaus, facing siege and a probable loss, agreed to let the brothers marry his daughters in a large wedding feast where every couple was married on the same night. However, he gave all the Danaids swords, and instructed them to kill their husbands after they had fallen asleep on their wedding night and bring their heads to him as proof of the deed.

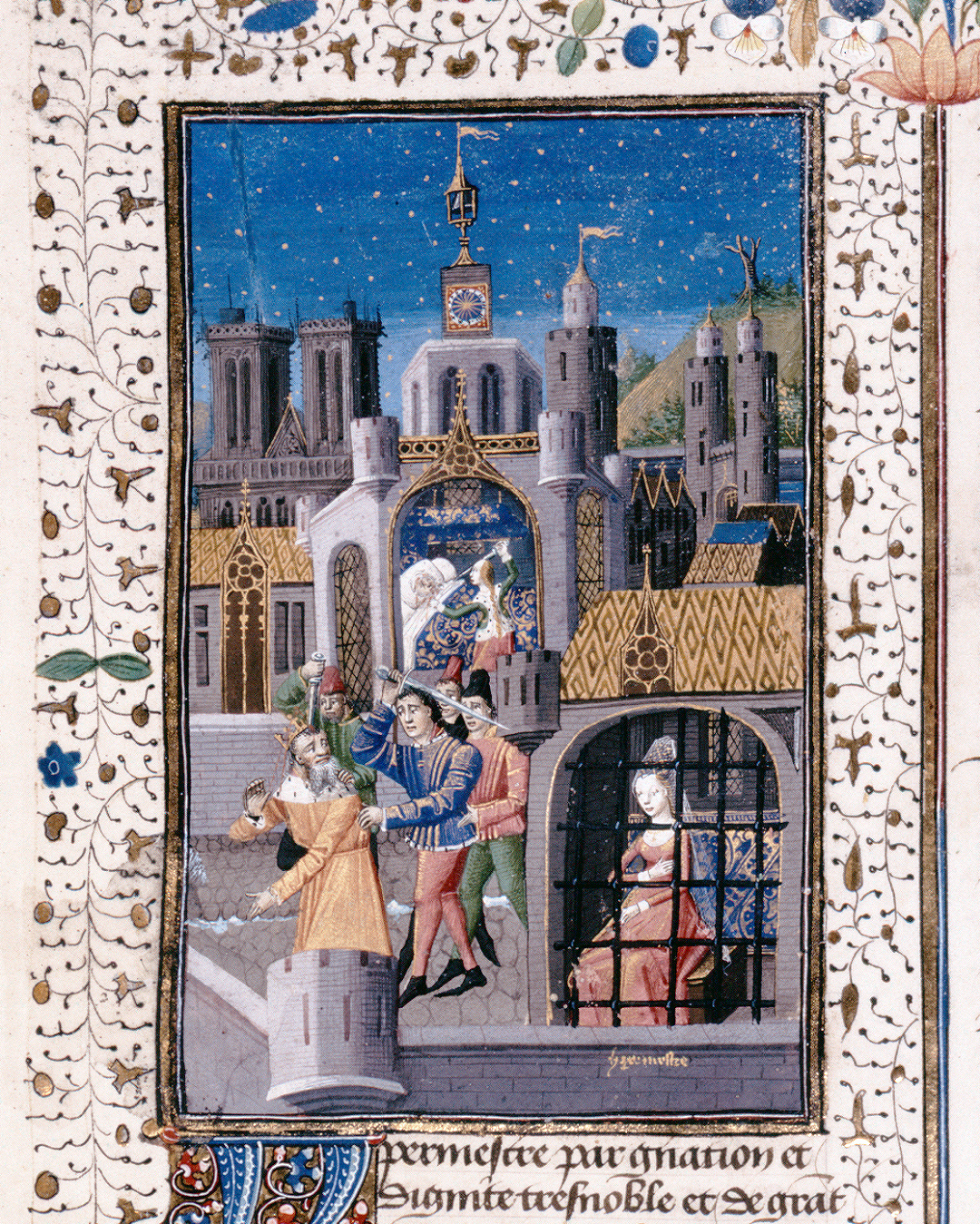
An illumination of Hypermnestra imprisoned by Danaus

While all 49 other sisters followed through with their father's command and killed their husbands, Hypermnestra refused because her husband Lynceus honored her wish to remain a virgin. However, in Ovid's telling of the story, Hypermnestra does not mention her virginity, but believes the act of murdering her husband is barbarous and immoral. She states she would rather be found guilty of betraying her father than committing murder, for she believes it to be an unforgivable act. After sparing her husband, Hypermnestra helped Lynceus flee back to safety either with his father in Egypt or to Lynceia, a city in the Argolid. In the version of the myth where he flees to Lynceia, Lynceus informed his wife of his safety by lighting a torch: she then informed him of her safety by lighting a torch from Larissa, the citadel of Argos. The city was later named Lynceia in his honor.

Danaus was enraged by Hypermnestra's disobedience. He imprisoned her and tried her in the Argive courts. However, she was acquitted— alternatively, saved by Aphrodite— and to commemorate her escape, commissioned an image of Aphrodite, "Bringer of Victory." In some versions of the myth, Lynceus killed Danaus for his treachery, and in others, Danaus died years later and passed the kingdom to Lynceus.

Together Lynceus and Hypermnestra had a son, Abas, the first king of the Abantiad Dynasty and the founder of Abae.

Apollodorus claims the heads of the murdered husbands were buried at Lerna, where Athena and Hermes then purified the ground at the command of Zeus. However, Pausanias claims the heads were instead buried at Larisa, and the headless bodies were buried in Lerna. Additionally, in some versions of the myth, the Danaides were punished in the underworld by being forced to carry water in a jug with holes, or a sieve, so the water always leaked out. Hypermnestra, however, went straight to Elysium.

== Cultural depictions ==
Ovid wrote a letter from Hypermnestra to Lynceus, which appears in his Heroides.

Geoffrey Chaucer wrote a Legend of Hypermnestra.

Francesco Cavalli wrote Hipermestra, first performed at Florence on 12 June 1658, as a festa teatrale opera.

Hypermnestra is referred to in John Webster's tragedy 'The White Devil', in a speech by the scheming courtesan Flamineo: "...Trust a woman? never, never... We lay our souls to pawn to the devil for a little pleasure, and a woman makes the bill of sale. That ever man should marry! For one Hypermnestra that saved her lord and husband, forty-nine of her sisters cut their husbands' throats all in one night."

Charles-Hubert Gervais composed the opera Hypermnestre, first performed at the Académie Royale de Musique (the Paris Opera) on 3 November 1716.

Ignaz Holzbauer composed a German opera entitled Hypermnestra with a German libretto by Johann Leopold van Ghelen that was performed in Vienna in 1741.

Antonio Salieri composed the opera Les Danaïdes with a French libretto by François-Louis Gand Le Bland Du Roullet and Louis-Théodore de Tschudi in 1784, premiering in Paris.

== Argive genealogy ==
Argive genealogy in Greek mythology

Oceanus	Tethys
Inachus	Melia
Zeus	Io	Phoroneus
Epaphus	Memphis
Libya	Poseidon
Achiroë	Belus	Agenor	Telephassa
Danaus	Elephantis	Aegyptus	Cadmus	Cilix	Europa	Phoenix
Mantineus	Hypermnestra	Lynceus	Harmonia	Zeus
Sparta	Lacedaemon	Ocalea	Abas	Polydorus	Agave	Sarpedon	Rhadamanthus
Eurydice	Acrisius	Autonoë	Ino	Minos
Zeus	Danaë	Semele	Zeus
Perseus	Dionysus

Colour key:

Male
Female
Deity

== See also ==
- City of Lyrceia
