= Thasus =

Phoenician figure in Greek mythology

In Greek mythology, Thasus or Thasos (/ˈθeɪsəs/ or /ˈθeɪzəs/; Ancient Greek: Θάσος) was a son of Poseidon (or, in other versions, Agenor, Phoenix or Cilix). He was a Phoenician prince and one of those who set out from Phoenicia in search of Europa (Thasus' sister). His brother, Cadmus, gave him a part of the army and left him on an island (Thasos) where he "founded" the eponymous town of Thasos.
