= Elephantis (mythology) =

Wife of Danaus

In Greek mythology, Elephantis (Ancient Greek: Ἐλεφαντίδος or Ἐλεφαντίς, romanized: Elephantís) was one of the multiple women of Danaus, king of Libya. She became the mother of two Danaides: Hypermnestra and Gorgophone. The latter married and murdered her husband Proteus during their wedding night while Hypermnestra spared the life of her spouse Lynceus. These couples then started a new line of the Argive dynasty and became the ancestors of Acrisius, Danae, Perseus, Heracles, etc.

According to Hippostratus, Danaus had all his progeny begotten by Europa, the daughter of the river-god Nilus. In some accounts, he married Melia, daughter of his uncle Agenor, king of Tyre.

== Argive genealogy ==
Argive genealogy in Greek mythology

Oceanus	Tethys
Inachus	Melia
Zeus	Io	Phoroneus
Epaphus	Memphis
Libya	Poseidon
Belus	Achiroë	Agenor	Telephassa
Danaus	Elephantis	Aegyptus	Cadmus	Cilix	Europa	Phoenix
Mantineus	Hypermnestra	Lynceus	Harmonia	Zeus
Polydorus
Sparta	Lacedaemon	Ocalea	Abas	Agave	Sarpedon	Rhadamanthus
Autonoë
Eurydice	Acrisius	Ino	Minos
Zeus	Danaë	Semele	Zeus
Perseus	Dionysus

Colour key:

Male
Female
Deity
