= Lyrceia =

Coordinates: 37°41′34″N 22°37′53″E

Lyrceia or Lyrkeia (Ancient Greek: ἡ Λύρκεια), or Lyrceium or Lyrkeion (Λυρκεῖον), was a town in ancient Argolis, distant 60 stadia (a little less than 7 miles) from Argos, and 60 stadia from Orneae, and situated on the road Climax, which proceeded from the gate of Deiras and ran from Argos in a northwesterly direction along the bed of the Inachus. The town is said to have been originally called Lynceia, and to have obtained this name from Lynceus, who fled hither when all his other brothers, the sons of Aegyptus, were murdered by the daughters of Danaus on their wedding night. He gave intelligence of his safe arrival in this place to his faithful wife Hypermnestra, by holding up a torch; and she in like manner informed him of her safety by raising a torch from Larissa, the citadel of Argos. The name of the town was afterwards changed into Lyrceia from Lyrcus, a son of Abas. It was in ruins in the time of Pausanias.

Its site is located near the modern Schinochori.
