= Aegyptus =

Person in Greek mythology

In Greek mythology, Aegyptus or Ægyptus (/ɪˈdʒɪptəs/; Ancient Greek: Αἴγυπτος, romanized: Aíguptos) was a legendary king of ancient Egypt. He was a descendant of the princess Io through his father Belus, and of the river-god Nilus as both the father of Achiroe, his mother and as a great, great-grandfather on his father's side.

== Family ==
Aegyptos was the son of King Belus of Egypt and Achiroe, a naiad daughter of Nile, or of Sida, eponym of Sidon. He was the twin brother of Danaus, king of Libya while Euripides adds two others, Cepheus, king of Aethiopia and Phineus, betrothed of Andromeda. He may be the same or different from another Aegyptus who was called the son of Zeus and Thebe.

Aegyptus fathered fifty sons by different women: six of whom by a woman of royal blood called Argyphia; ten by an Arabian woman; seven by a Phoenician woman; three by Tyria; twelve by the naiad Caliadne; six by Gorgo and lastly another six by Hephaestine. According to Hippostratus, Aegyptus had these progeny by a single woman called Eurryroe, daughter of Nilus. In some accounts, Aegyptus consorted with Isaie while Danaus married Melia, these two women were daughters of their uncle Agenor, king of Tyre, and of their possible sister, Damno who was described as the daughter of Belus.

== Mythology ==
Aegyptus ruled Arabia and conquered nearby country ruled by people called Melampodes/Melampods and called it by his name, Egypt. Aegyptus fathered fifty sons, who were all but one murdered by forty nine of the fifty daughters of Aegyptus' twin brother, Danaus, eponym of the Danaïdes.

A scholium on a line in Euripides, Hecuba 886, reverses these origins, placing the twin brothers at first in Argolis, whence Aegyptus was expelled and fled to the land that was named after him. In the more common version, Aegyptus commanded that his fifty sons marry the fifty Danaïdes, and Danaus with his daughters fled to Argos, ruled by Pelasgus or by Gelanor, whom Danaus replaced. When Aegyptus and his sons arrived to take the Danaïdes, Danaus relinquished them, to spare the Argives the pain of a battle; however, he instructed his daughters to kill their husbands on their wedding night. Forty-nine followed through, but one, Hypermnestra ("greatly wooed"), refused, because her husband, Lynceus the "lynx-man", honored her wish to remain a virgin. Danaus was angry with his disobedient daughter and threw her to the Argive courts. Aphrodite intervened and saved her. Lynceus and Hypermnestra founded the lineage of Argive kings, a Danaid Dynasty.

In some versions, Lynceus later slew Danaus as revenge for the death of his brothers, and the Danaïdes were punished in the underworld by being forced to carry water with a jug with holes, or a sieve, so that the water always leaked out.

The story of Danaus and his daughters, and the reason for their flight from marriage, provided the theme of Aeschylus' The Suppliants.

== Genealogy ==
Argive genealogy in Greek mythology

Oceanus	Tethys
Inachus	Melia
Zeus	Io	Phoroneus
Epaphus	Memphis
Libya	Poseidon
Achiroë	Belus	Agenor	Telephassa
Danaus	Elephantis	Aegyptus	Cadmus	Cilix	Europa	Phoenix
Mantineus	Hypermnestra	Lynceus	Harmonia	Zeus
Sparta	Lacedaemon	Ocalea	Abas	Polydorus	Agave	Sarpedon	Rhadamanthus
Eurydice	Acrisius	Autonoë	Ino	Minos
Zeus	Danaë	Semele	Zeus
Perseus	Dionysus

Colour key:

Male
Female
Deity

== See also ==
- Sons of Aegyptus
