= Apis (son of Telchis) =

King of Sicyon in Greek mythology

In Greek mythology, Apis (/ˈeɪpɪs/; Ancient Greek: Ἄπις, from apios 'far-off', 'of the pear-tree') was the fourth king of Sicyon who reigned for 25 years.

== Family ==
Apis was the son and heir of King Telchis, descendant of the city's founder Aegialeus. He was the father of Thelxion who succeeded him in the throne. Apis belonged to a legacy of primeval kings of Sicyon which is as follows: Aegialeus, Europs, Telchis, Apis, Thelxion, Agyreus, Thurimachus, Leucippus.

== Mythology ==
Apis reached such a height of power before Pelops came to Olympia that all the territory south of the Isthmus was called after him Apia. This was also attributed to his Argive namesake who have had Peloponnesus named Apia after him. Apis was, however, a tyrant, and was overthrown by his son Thelxion.

Regnal titles
Preceded by Telchis	King of Sicyon; 25 years	Succeeded by Thelxion
