= Leucippus (son of Thurimachus) =

In Greek mythology, Leucippus (Ancient Greek: Λεύκιππος, romanized: Leúkippos, lit. 'white horse') was the eighth king of Sicyon who reigned for 53 years.

== Family ==
Leucippus was the son and heir of King Thurimachus, son of Aegyrus, son of Thelxion, son of Apis, son of Telchis, son of Europs, son of Aegialeus (an autochthon).

== Mythology ==
According to Pausanias' account, Leucippus had only one child, a daughter Calchinia. She bore Poseidon a son, Peratus, who was reared by Leucippus and inherited the kingdom. In some account, Leucippus was succeeded by Messapus as the ninth king of Sicyon.

Regnal titles
| Preceded by Thurimachus | King of Sicyon; 53 years | Succeeded by Peratus or Messapus |
