= Peitho =

Greek personification of persuasion

- Personification of Persuasion
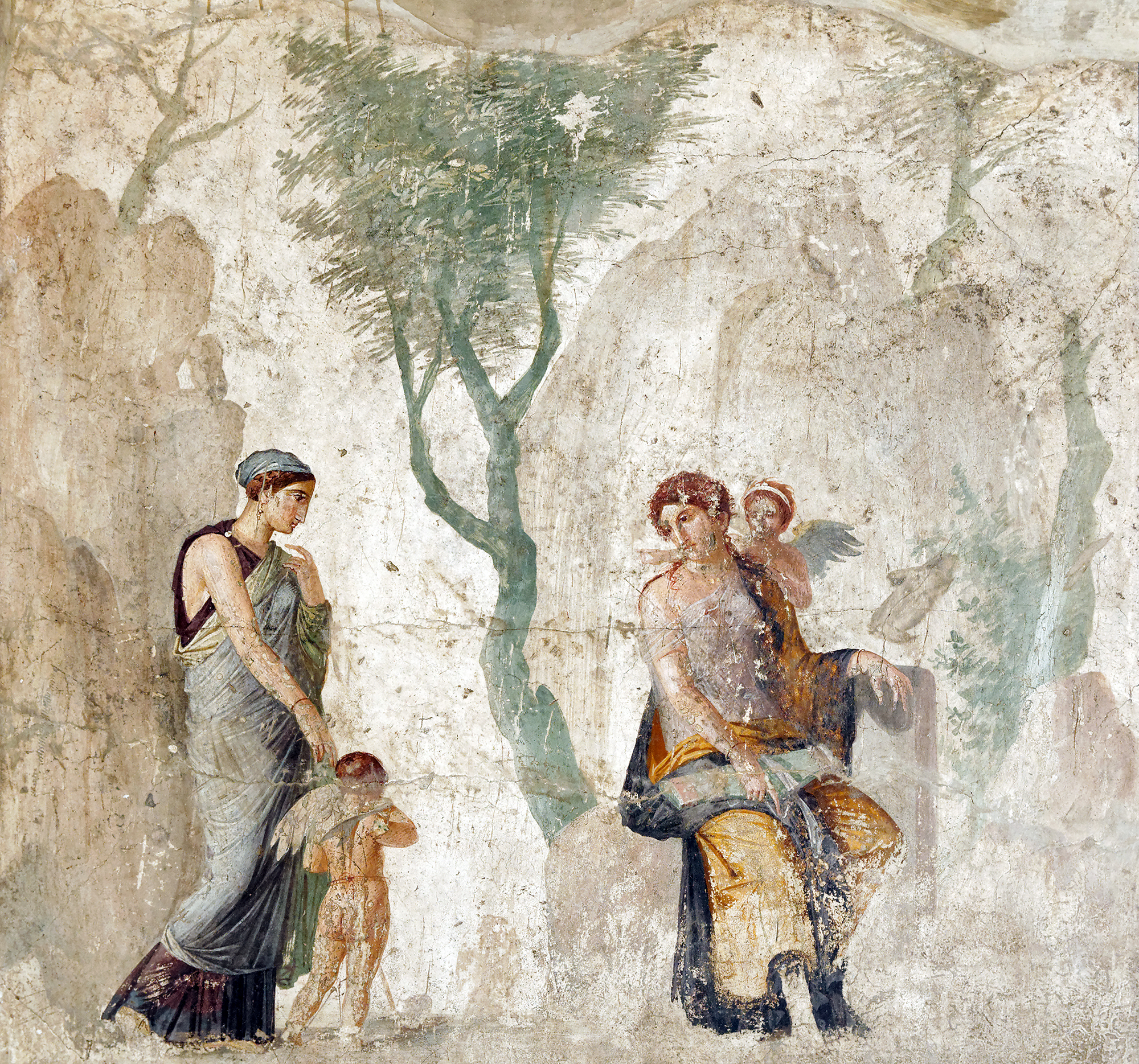
- Pompeiian fresco of Eros being brought by Peitho to Aphrodite
- Abode: Mount Olympus

Genealogy
- Parents: Oceanus and Tethys
- Siblings: Oceanids, the river gods

In Greek mythology, Peitho (Ancient Greek: Πειθώ, romanized: Peithō, lit. 'Persuasion' or 'winning eloquence') is the personification of persuasion. She is a goddess of charming speech. She is typically presented as an important companion of Aphrodite. Her opposite is Bia, the personification of force. As a personification, she was sometimes imagined as a goddess and sometimes an abstract power with her name used both as a common and proper noun. There is evidence that Peitho was referred to as a goddess before she was referred to as an abstract concept, which is rare for a personification. Peitho represents both sexual and political persuasion. She is associated with the art of rhetoric.

== Family ==
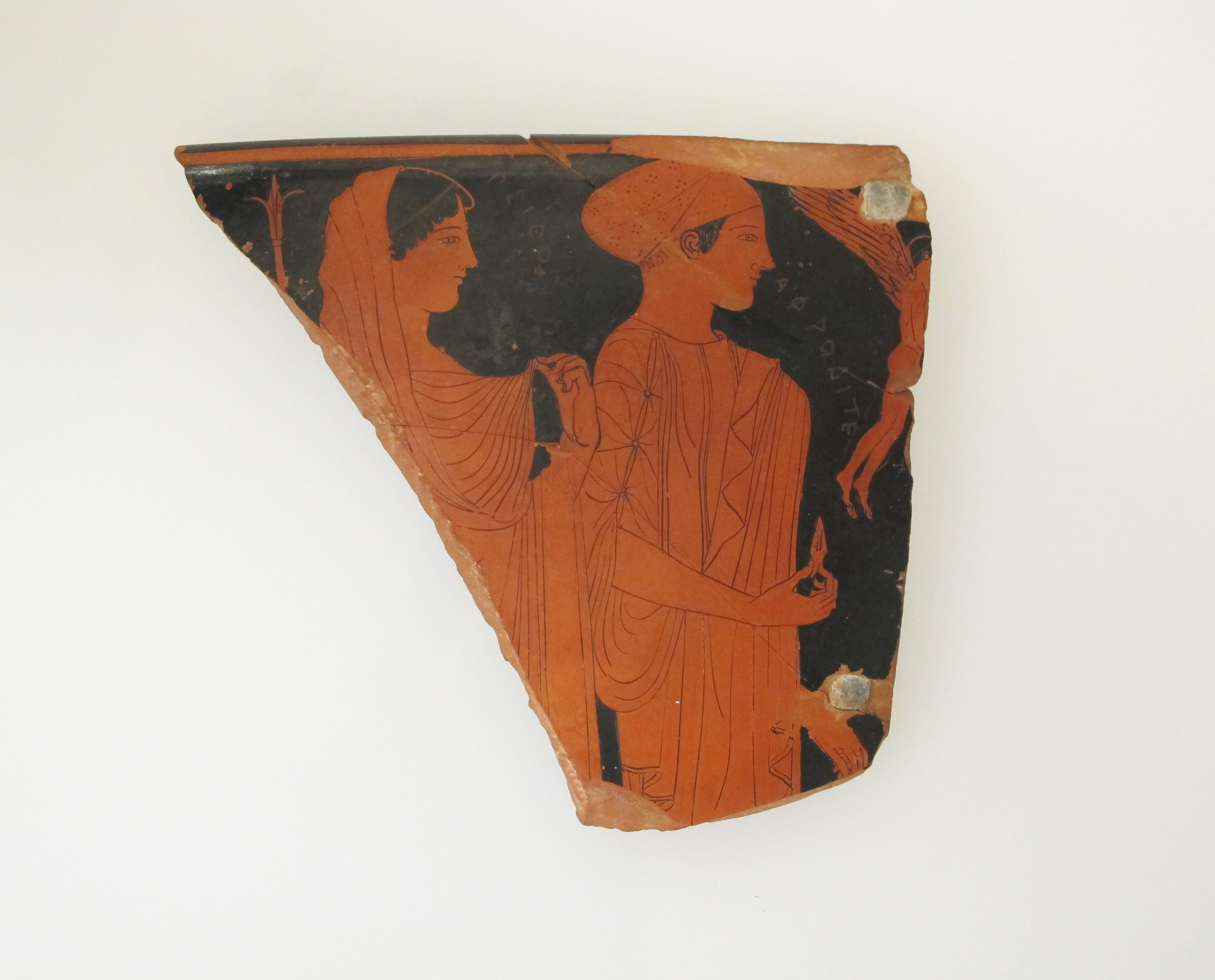
Fragment depicting Peitho, Aphrodite, and Eros. This skyphos fragment may be the earliest known artistic representation of Peitho, circa 490 B.C.E. (The Metropolitan Museum of Art).

Peitho's ancestry is unclear, as various authors provide different identities for her parents. Hesiod in Theogony identifies Peitho as the daughter of the Titans Tethys and Oceanus, which would make her an Oceanid and the sister of notable goddesses such as Dione, Doris, and Metis. According to the lyric poet Sappho, she was the daughter of Aphrodite. Aeschylus identifies her as the daughter of Aphrodite in Suppliant Women (Hiketides), but also describes her as the child of Ate in Agamemnon. Nonnus in his Dionysiaca describes the Charites (Graces), an ensemble of goddesses of grace and charm, as including Peitho, Pasithea, and Aglaia, and all of them are identified as daughters of Dionysus. The Hellenistic era elegiac poet Hermesianax also refers to Peitho as one of the Charites. Alcman describes her as the daughter of Prometheia and the sister of Tyche and Eunomia.

Nonnus identifies Peitho as the wife of Hermes, the messenger of the gods. However, commentary on Euripides' Orestes notes that Peitho is the wife of Phoroneus, the primordial King of Argos, and the mother of Aegialeus, Apis, Europs and Niobe. An alternative Argive tradition describes her instead as the wife of Argos, Phoroneus's grandson. The Byzantine encyclopedic text, Suda, states that the mother of Iynx was either Peitho or Ekho.

== Mythology ==
Peitho plays a limited role in mythology, mainly appearing with or as a companion of Aphrodite.

A degraded fragment by Sappho may identify Peitho as an attendant of Aphrodite, although other possibilities are Hebe, Iris, or even Hekate. Pindar characterizes Peitho, either as the abstract concept of persuasion or the goddess, as a wise one that holds the "secret key to holy love", associating her with Aphrodite. She is also described as the nurse of the baby Erotes, who are Aphrodite's children. A fragment by Ibycus describes Aphrodite and Peitho, who is described as tendered eyed (aganoblepharos), nursing Euryalus among rose blossoms.

Nonnus gives her a role within the marriage of Kadmos and Harmonia, as she appears to Kadmos in the form of a mortal slave and covers Kadmos in a mist to lead him unseen through Samothrace to the palace of Electra, Harmonia's adoptive mother. Peitho often appears on a 5th century epinetron by the Eretria Painter depicting Harmonia’s bridal preparations with Aphrodite, Eros, Persephone (Kore), Hebe, and Himeros as in attendance. In art, she was also depicted at the weddings for Dionysus and Ariadne, Alkestis and Admetos, Thetis and Peleus, and at the union of Aphrodite and Adonis. A hydria attributed to the Meidias Painter shows Peitho fleeing from the scene of the abduction of the Leukippidai by the Dioskuri, indicating either that she persuaded the women into eloping or that she does not condone the marriage by Athenian standards.

When Zeus ordered the creation of the first woman (Pandora), Peitho and the Charites placed golden necklaces around her neck, and the Horae (Seasons) crowned Pandora's head with spring flowers. Extravagant jewelry, particularly necklaces, were viewed with suspicion in Ancient Greek literature, as they were typically seen as a way for women to seduce men, making the necklace a way to enhance Pandora’s sexual attractiveness and persuasive abilities.

In art, Peitho is often represented with Aphrodite during the abduction of Helen, symbolizing the forces of persuasion and love at work during the scene. Her presence at the event may be interpreted as either Paris needing persuasion to claim Helen as a prize for choosing Aphrodite, or Helen needing to be persuaded to accompany him to Troy, as Helen's level of agency became a popular topic of discussion in the 5th century. Peitho's presence brings the question of whether mortals have the ability to resist her power or whether they are bound to her persuasive abilities.

== Cult and function ==
Cults dedicated to Peitho date to at least the early 5th century. In her role as an attendant or companion of Aphrodite, Peitho was intimately connected to the goddess of love and beauty. Aphrodite and Peitho were sometimes conflated, more commonly in the later periods, with the name Peitho appearing in conjunction with or as an epithet of Aphrodite's name. She is also identified with Tyche in Suppliant Women (Hiketides). Peitho was associated with marriage, since a suitor or his father would negotiate with the father or guardian of a young woman for her hand in marriage and offer a bridal price in return for her. The most desirable women drew many prospective suitors, and persuasive skill often determined the suitor's success. Plutarch includes her on a list of five deities for new couples to pray to; also included are Zeus (Teleios), Hera (Teleia), Aphrodite, and Artemis.

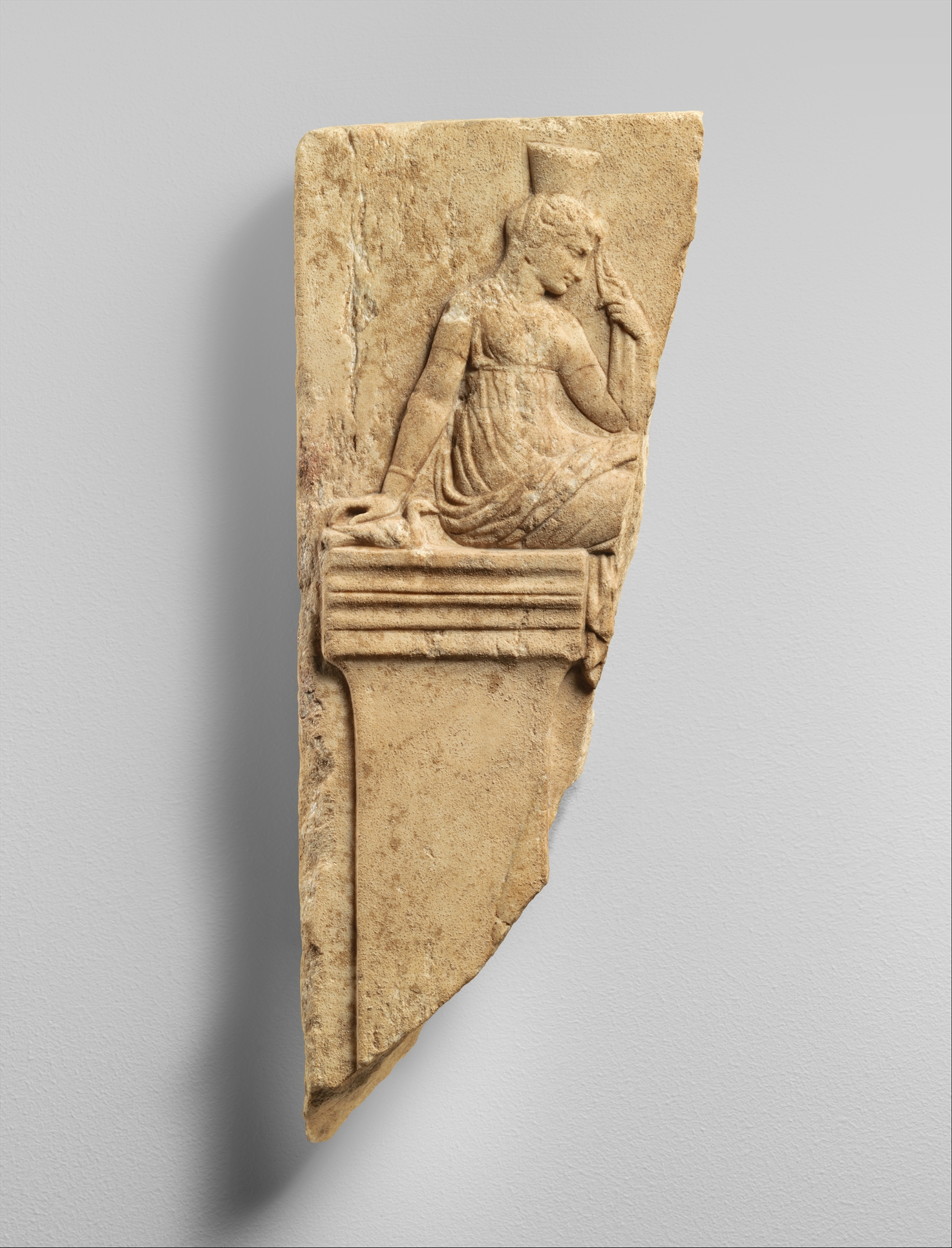
A Roman relief depicting Peitho, circa 1st century B.C.E. (The Metropolitan Museum of Art).

Peitho was an important figure for emphasising civic harmony, particularly in Athens and Argos, and harmony within interpersonal relationships. Notably in Athens, the unification (synoikismos) of the city by Theseus was only possible with the intervention of both Aphrodite and Peitho to create democratic spirit and cooperation. In Argos, she was paired with the early kings of the city, functioning as a civic unifier in a similar role as Harmonia, the first Queen of Thebes. On a 4th century vase from Apulia, Peitho and Hermes are depicted together instructing Tripolemus to teach agriculture to mankind, indicating Peitho's role in creating harmony through civilization. Plutarch outlines Peitho’s role in interpersonal harmony in Moralia, where he states that persuasion’s role within a marriage is so that spouses can achieve their wants without quarreling. In Eumenides, Athena thanks Peitho after convincing the Furies of her reasoning in acquitting Orestes and successfully defusing strife. However, Peitho may be a destructive force when used for seduction or selfish personal gains, such as in Agamemnon where Clytemnestra curses Peitho for Paris’s stealing of Helen, and she uses persuasion to convince Cassandra to enter the house in order to murder her.

=== Cult within Athens ===
Pausanias reports that after the unification (synoikismos) of Athens, Theseus set up a cult of Aphrodite Pandemos and Peitho on the south slope of Acropolis of Athens. In recognition of this myth, both goddesses were worshipped in the Attic Aphrodisia Festival. Peitho was worshipped independently as the goddess of both sexual and rhetorical persuasion in Athens from the 4th century into the Roman Imperial era, the time of Pausanias’s writing. However, some scholars believe it is possible that worship dates to the 6th century, but there is not strong evidence for this assertion. A votive inscription to Peitho was found at the site of the Temple of Aphrodite, reinforcing the link between these goddesses at Athens. The Theatre of Dionysus had seat reserved for the priestess of Peitho. Peitho was an important figure to Athenian rhetoricians in 5th century and was considered an important figure for human affairs, as persuasion was a major component to rhetoric. Rhetorician Isocrates notes in Section 249 of Antidosis that sacrifices are made to Peitho in the city annually. Furthermore, comic poet Eupolis said that Peitho sat on the lips of Pericles for his persuasive skills. Persuasion was considered essential for the democratic state's success.

=== Cults within other Greek cities ===
Despite her connection to Aphrodite in Athens, Peitho was more commonly associated with Artemis in the Peloponnese, as the two goddesses either shared a temple at Argos or "Peitho" being used as an epithet for Artemis. Peitho’s association with Artemis may have formed due to a shared with importance with adult development and the loss of sexual innocence. At Argos, this temple was also shared with Hypermestra, who was acquitted in trial of a case brought by her father, as she was the only Danaid who did not murder her husband on her wedding night as per her father's orders. With this association, Peitho is connected to persuasive speech generally as opposed to just seductive persuasion.

Pindar refers to courtesans and prostitutes in Corinth as "the servants of Peitho", however, he does not elaborate on whether there was any cults associated with Peitho in the city nor whether courtesans had a particular reverence for the goddess. This passage has stirred debate among scholars one whether sacred prostitution was practiced in Greece. Peitho was commonly shown wearing jewelry, fixing her clothing, holding jars of perfume, or looking into mirrors, traits that may be associated with hetairai.

In Sicyon, Peitho had a cult and a temple, which was connected to the cults of Artemis and Apollo. According to a local cult practice recorded by Pausanias, during the festival of Apollo, seven boys and girls take the statues of Artemis and Apollo to the Sythas River and take them to the sanctuary of Peitho, after which they are returned to the Temple of Apollo. The aetiological myth for this practice was that the citizens of Sicyon refused to purify the twin gods after the slaying of Python, and as a result a plague was sent to the city. Seven boys and girls went to the river to convince the gods to return, they were successful, indicating that even the gods are susceptible to the power of persuasion, and the sanctuary to Peitho was established at this spot. There was no cult image to Peitho by the Roman Imperial Period, however, this does not mean that one never existed.

According to Pausanias, in addition to the cults and sanctuaries dedicated to Peitho at Athens and Argos, there was an image decorating the throne at the Temple of Zeus at Olympia where Aphrodite, rising from the sea is greeted by Eros and crowned by Peitho. In Megara, statues of Peitho and Paregoros (personification of soothing words) stood in the Temple of Aphrodite Praxis (of intercourse). There is also evidence that Peitho had cults in Paros, Thasos, and Lesbos.
