= Aphrodisia =

Festival of Aphrodite

The Aphrodisia festival (Ancient Greek: Ἀφροδίσια) was an annual festival held in Ancient Greece in honor of the goddess of love and beauty, Aphrodite (Ancient Greek: Ἀφροδίτη Πάνδημος). It took place in several Ancient Greek towns, but was especially important in Attica and on the island of Cyprus, where Aphrodite was venerated with a magnificent celebration. The festival occurred during the month of Hekatombaion, which modern scholars recognize as starting from the third week in July to the third week of August on the Gregorian calendar. Aphrodite was worshipped in most towns of Cyprus, as well as in Cythera, Sparta, Thebes, Delos, and Elis, and her most ancient temple was the Sanctuary of Aphrodite Paphia at Palaepaphos. Textual sources explicitly mention Aphrodisia festivals in Corinth and in Athens, where the many prostitutes that resided in the city celebrated the festival as a means of worshipping their patron goddess. Though no textual sources expressly mention an Aphrodisia festival in Cythera, Thebes, or Elis, it likely occurred since textual and iconographical sources indicate that Aphrodite Pandemos had a cult following in these areas. The Aphrodisia festival was one of the most important ceremonies in Delos, though not much is known about the details of the celebration. The inscriptions merely indicate that the festival required the purchase of ropes, torches and wood, which were customary expenses of all Delian festivals.

== Festival rituals ==
What is known about the rituals of the Aphrodisia festival is consistent with Aphrodite's representation in iconography and text. For example, the first ritual of the festival would be to purify the temple with the blood from a dove, the sacred bird of Aphrodite. Afterwards, worshipers would carry sacred images of the goddess, as well as Peitho, in a procession to be washed. Aphrodite's connection to the sea is well-documented, and originates in Hesiod's Theogony, where he refers to her as the "foam-born goddess." During the festival it was not permitted to make bloody sacrifices, since the altar could not be polluted with the blood of the sacrifice victims, which were usually white male goats. This of course excludes the blood of the sacred dove, made at the beginning of the ritual to purify the altar. In addition to live male goats, worshipers would offer fire, flowers, and incense. The white male goat is also a consistent symbol in the worship of Aphrodite Pandemos. She was often represented in iconography riding on a male goat, which was known to be a carnal symbol. Pausanias wittily reports, "The meaning of the tortoise and of the he-goat I leave to those who care to guess," slyly implying the sensual nature of Aphrodite's representation.

== Aphrodite Pandemos ==
In the 4th century, Attic philosophers drew a distinction between Aphrodite Urania, a celestial Aphrodite who represented higher, or transcendent spiritual love, and Aphrodite Pandemos, a goddess representing earthly, non-spiritual love. Aphrodite Pandemos translates to "common to all the people," and her realm of influence extends beyond sensual pleasures to civic and interpersonal harmony. She also implicitly unites the population into a singular social or political body with the notion of commonality amongst all people. Her worship in Athens in is attributed to Theseus, who was considered the founder of a shrine to Aphrodite and Peitho in Agora, which he established to thank the goddesses for their assistance with uniting the scattered tribes of Attica into one political and social body of Athenians in what was known as the synoikismos ("dwelling together"). Peitho, the goddess of persuasion, was also worshipped during the Attic Aphrodisia. Preparations for the festival may have included the sacrifice of doves to purify the temple and altar, washing the statues, coating the temple roof in pitch, and the acquiring purple cloth. Some scholars speculate that the festival took place on the fourth day of Hekatombaion (mid July-mid August), near the beginning of the Attic new year.

== See also ==
- Athenian festivals
- Cosmas of Aphrodisia
