= Chrysorthe =

In Greek mythology, Chrysorthe (Ancient Greek: Χρυσόρθη) was a Sicyonian princess as the daughter of King Orthopolis, descendant of the city's founder Apis. By Apollo, she became the mother of Coronus who succeeded her father in the throne of Sicyon.
