= Orthopolis =

In Greek mythology, Orthopolis (Ancient Greek: Ὀρθόπολις) was the 12th king of Sicyon who reigned for 63 years.

== Family ==
Orthopolis was the son and heir of King Plemnaeus, descendant of the city's founder Apis. He was the father of Chrysorthe, mother by Apollo of Coronus, the successor to the Sicyonian throne.

== Mythology ==
Before Orthopolis was born, all the children borne to his father Plemnaeus by his mother died the very first time they cried. Later on, the goddess Demeter who took pity on the unfortunate king came to Aegialea (ancient name of Sicyon) in the guise of a strange woman and reared for him his son Orthopolis.

In some account of the myth, the crown of Sicyon was passed to Marathonius instead of Coronus.

Regnal titles
Preceded by Plemnaeus	King of Sicyon; 63 years	Succeeded by Marathonius
