= Thurimachus =

King of Sicyon in Greek mythology

In Greek mythology, Thurimachus (Ancient Greek: Θουρίμαχος) was the seventh king of Sicyon who reigned for 45 years.

== Family ==
Thurimachus was the son and heir of King Aegyrus, descendant of the city's founder Aegialeus (an autochthon). He succeeded by his son Leucippus, father of Calchinia.

== Mythology ==
During Thurimachus's reign, Inachus became the first king of the Argives.

Regnal titles
Preceded by Aegyrus	King of Sicyon; 45 years	Succeeded by Leucippus
