= Eretria Painter =

Classical Greece vase painter

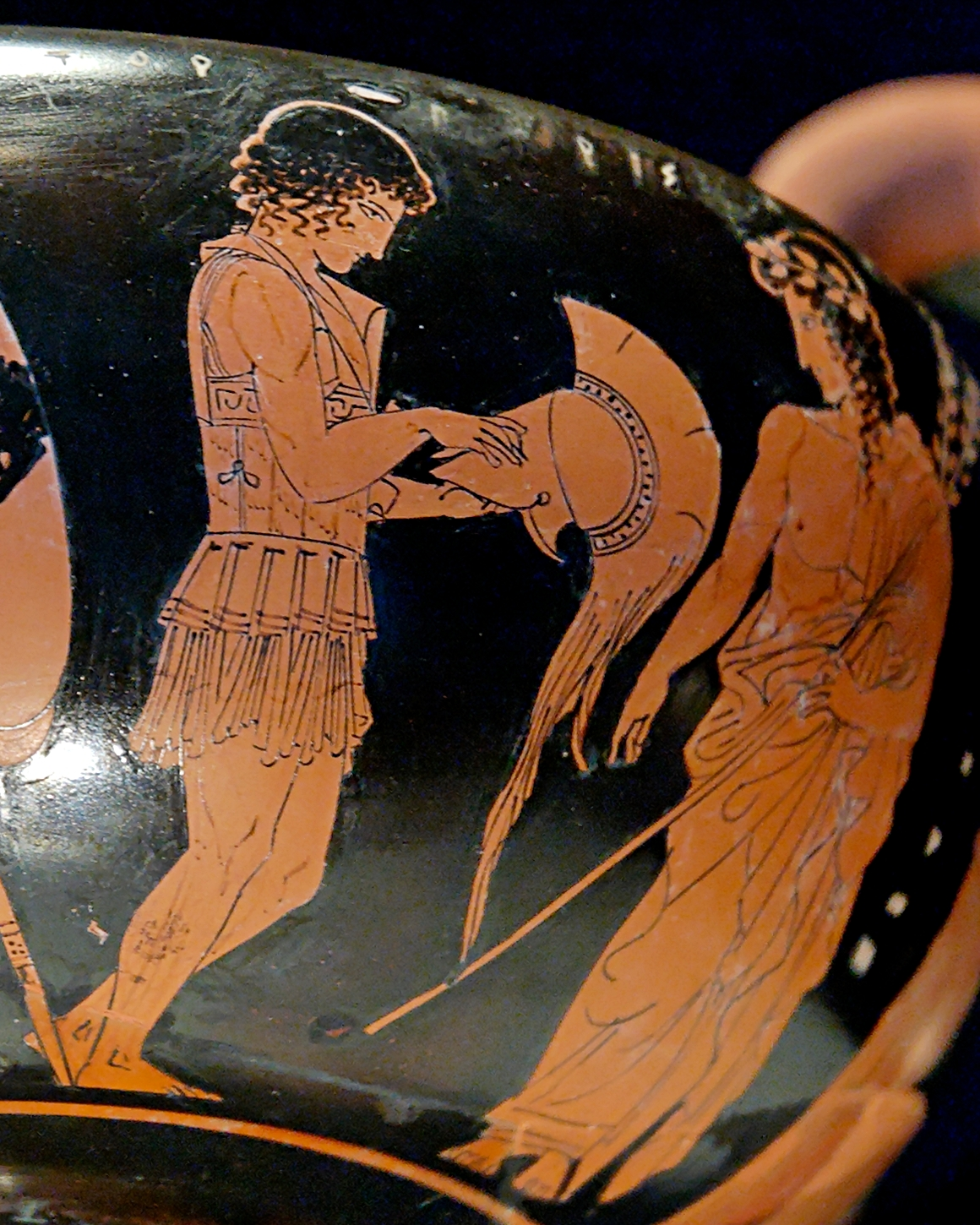
Paris donning his armour, watched over by Apollo; Gravina in Puglia: Museo Pomarici Santomasi

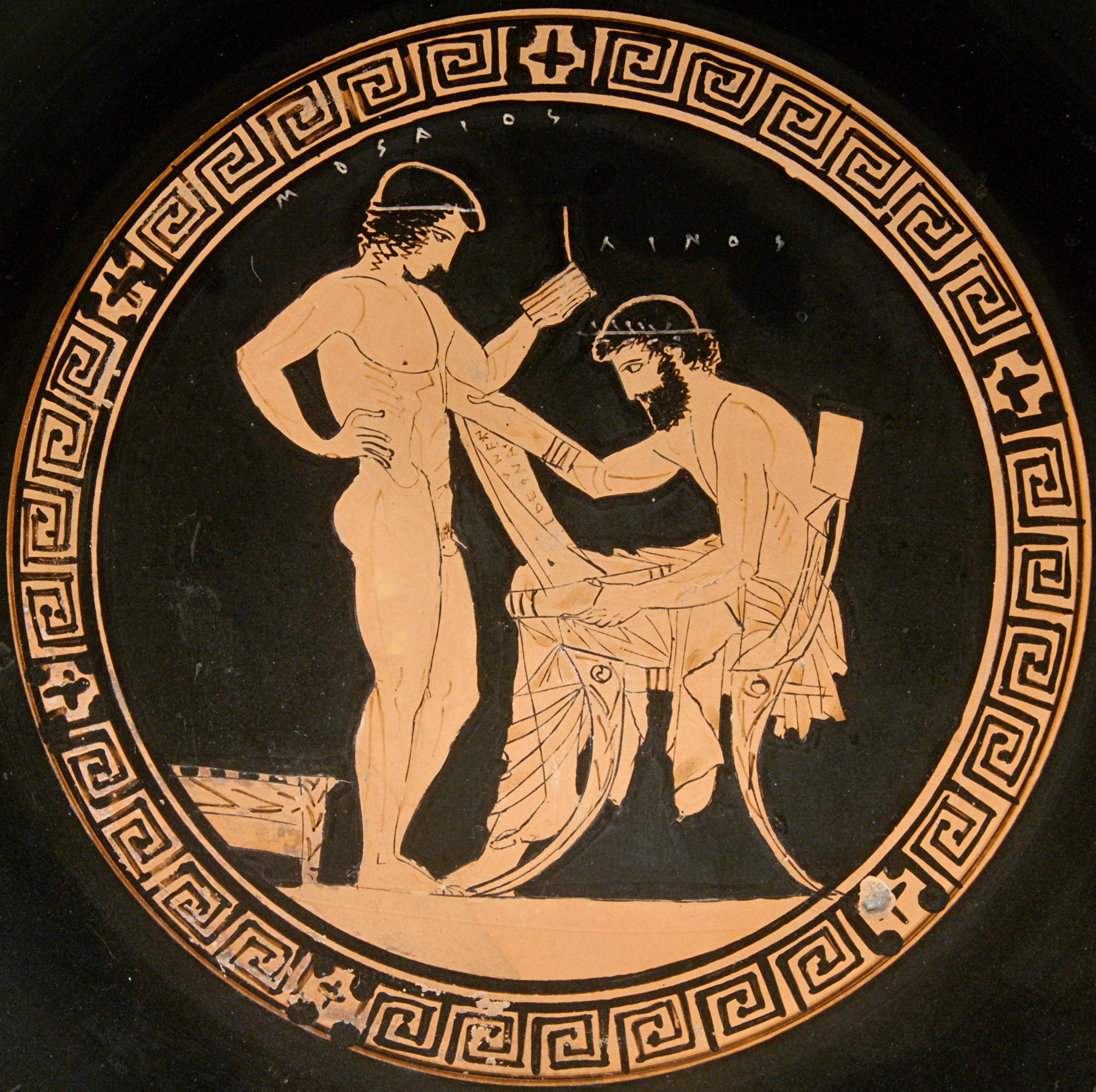
Linos and Mousaios on the tondo of a kylix; c. 440–435 BC; Paris: Louvre

The Eretria Painter was an ancient Greek Attic red-figure vase painter. He worked in the final quarter of the 5th century BC. The Eretria Painter is assumed to have been a contemporary of the Shuvalov Painter; he is considered one of the most interesting painters of his time. Many of his best works are painted on oinochoai and belly lekythoi. His paintings often depict many figures, moving in groups across all available surfaces. He also painted such vessels as figure-shaped vases or head-shaped kantharoi. Even as the vase shapes he painted on are unusual, his themes are conventional: athletes, satyrs and maenads, and mythological scenes. There are also some careful studies of women. He also painted white-ground vases. A lekythos in New York shows a funeral scene, typical of white-ground painting: Achilles is mourning Patroclus; the nereids bring him new weapons. The Eretria Painter's drawing style influenced later artists, e.g. the Meidias Painter and his school.

== Bibliography ==
- Beazley, John D. (1963). Attic Red Figure Vase Painters (2nd ed.). Oxford: Clarendon Press.
- Boardman, John (1991). Rotfigurige Vasen aus Athen: Die klassische Zeit. Kulturgeschichte der Antiken Welt (in German). Vol. 48. Mainz: Philipp von Zabern. p. 102, et al. ISBN 3-8053-1262-8.
- Lezzi-Hafter, Adrienne (1988). Der Eretria-Maler: Werke und Weggefährten. Forschungen zur Antiken Keramik (in German). Vol. II. Mainz: Philipp von Zabern. ISBN 3-8053-0963-5.
