= Thelxion =

Two Greek mythological figures

In Greek mythology, Thelxion (Ancient Greek: Θελξίων) is the name of two Greek mythological figures associated with a king named Apis. These two figures may be indistinct. One is Apis's son and the fifth king of Sicyon, mentioned by the travel writer Pausanias. The other is the murderer of Apis who is later killed by Argus Panoptes, as told by the mythographer Apollodorus.

== Pausanias ==
According to the 2nd-century AD travel writer Pausanias, Thelxion is the fifth king of the city of Sicyon and the son of Apis, its previous ruler. He was descended from the city's founder, Aegialeus, and was the father of Aegyrus, who succeeded him. No information is provided about Apis's death. The 19th- or early-20th-century scholars Eduard Lübbert, Otto Gruppe, and Rudolf Pfister believed that Pausanias's list of rulers had been derived from the Sicyonika by the historian Menaechmus of Sicyon, although it was not counted among the author's fragments in Felix Jacoby's Fragmente der griechischen Historiker.

== Apollodorus ==
In the Bibliotheca, a 1st- or 2nd-century AD mythological compendium by the mythographer Apollodorus, Thelxion is mentioned among the descendants of Inachus. Along with Telchin – who, in Pausanias's account, was Thelxion's grandfather – Thelxion kill Apis, the king of Argos, on account of the tyrannical nature of his rule. Argus Panoptes later murdered the two perpetrators for their crime. Another discrepancy between Apollodorus's and Pausanias's accounts is that the former considers Aegialeus to be Apis's uncle, whereas the latter calls him Apis's grandfather.

== Later references ==
The Chronographia by the 3rd-to-4th-century AD Christian writer Eusebius states that he held the throne for 52 years. The 4th-to-5th-century AD writer Augustine of Hippo, in his The City of God, writes that Thelxion's rule was a time marked by prosperity and peace; because of this, he was deified after his death, receiving veneration in the form of games and sacrifices. The account given by Apollodorus is retold by the 12th-century AD Byzantine poet John Tzetzes.

== Relation between the two ==
According to Pierre Grimal, these two figures may the same. In his 1934 article in the Real-Encyclopädie, Hans Lamer writes that it is not possible to merge Pausanias and Apollodorus's versions into one myth, and that one ought to ascertain which tradition is the more credible. The 19th-to-early-20th-century classicist Carl Robert's revised version of Ludwig Preller's Griechische Mythologie deems Apollodorus's version as the more trustworthy one, theorising that Thelxion and Telchin were originally blacksmiths of Phoroneus, with the myth that they were kings being unique to Sicyon; Lamer criticises this idea as unlikely. Carlos Parada's Genealogical Guide to Greek Mythology combines the two figures under the one entry.
