= Coronus (mythology) =

Set of mythological Greek characters

In Greek mythology, the name Coronus (Ancient Greek: Κόρωνος, lit. 'crooked, curved') may refer to:

- Coronus, king of the Lapiths, the son of Caeneus and counted among the Argonauts. His own children were Leonteus and Lysidice. He led a war against King Aegimius and was killed by Heracles. According to Bibliotheca, Coronus was erroneously(?) called the father of Caeneus instead.
- Coronus, king of Sicyon, son of Apollo and Chrysorthe, and father of Lamedon and Corex. Coronus inherited the kingdom of Sicyon from his maternal grandfather Orthopolis. Corex succeeded to his father's power, but himself left no heirs so the kingdom was usurped by Epopeus, after whose death it went back to Lamedon.
- Coronus, the Corinthian son of Thersander. He and his brother Haliartus were adopted by Athamas after the latter had lost all of his own sons. He was given land by Athamas and founded Coroneia.
- Coronus, father of Anaxirhoe, herself mother of Hyrmine
- Coronus, father of Asteria, herself possible mother of Idmon.
