= Messapus of Sicyon =

Legendary king of Sicyon

Messapus (Ancient Greek: Μέσσαπος, romanized: Messapos, lit. 'amid waters' or 'in the middle of waters') was the ninth king of Sicyon in the Peloponnesus according to classical Greek mythography.

== Mythology ==
Writers quoting Castor of Rhodes stated that he reigned over Sicyon for 47 years following Leucippus, and before Eratus. However, Pausanias omitted this king Messapus, alleging that the throne passed directly from Leucippus, who had no male heir, to his grandson Peratus.

According to Strabo, Messapio in Boeotia and later Messapia in southeastern Italy, derived their names from this Messapus.

St. Augustine writing in The City of God mentions Messapus of Sicyon, asserting that some historians had identified him with Cephissus.

Regnal titles
Preceded by Leucippus	King of Sicyon; 47 years	Succeeded by Peratus
