= Plemnaeus =

11th king of Sicyon

In Greek mythology, Plemnaeus (Ancient Greek: Πλημναῖον or Πλημναίῳ, romanized: Plemnaios) was the 11th king of Sicyon who reigned for 48 years.

== Family ==
Plemnaeus was the son and heir of King Peratus, son of Poseidon. He was the father of Orthopolis, his successor to the Sicyonian throne.

== Mythology ==
All the children borne to Plemnaeus and his wife died the very first time they wailed. At last, the goddess Demeter who took pity on the unfortunate king came to Aegialea (former name of Sicyon) in the guise of a strange woman and reared for him his son Orthopolis.

Regnal titles
Preceded by Peratus	King of Sicyon; 48 years	Succeeded by Orthopolis
