= Peratus =

Mythical Greek king and son of Poseidon

In Greek mythology, Peratus (Ancient Greek: Πέρατος"), also called Eratus (Ἔρατος), was the 10th king of Sicyon who reigned for 46 years.

== Family ==
Peratus was the son of the sea-god Poseidon and Calchinia, daughter of King Leucippus. He was father of Plemnaeus who succeeded him to the throne of Aegialea (former name of Sicyon).

== Mythology ==
Peratus' grandfather, King Leucippus, brought him up and at the latter's death handed over the kingdom to him. However, in some accounts, the crown of Sicyon was passed to Messapus before being inherited by Eratus .

Regnal titles
Preceded by Leucippus or Messapus	King of Sicyon; 46 years	Succeeded by Plemnaeus
