= Oinochoe by the Shuvalov Painter =

Ancient Greek vase art

Coordinates: 52.519°N 13.398°E

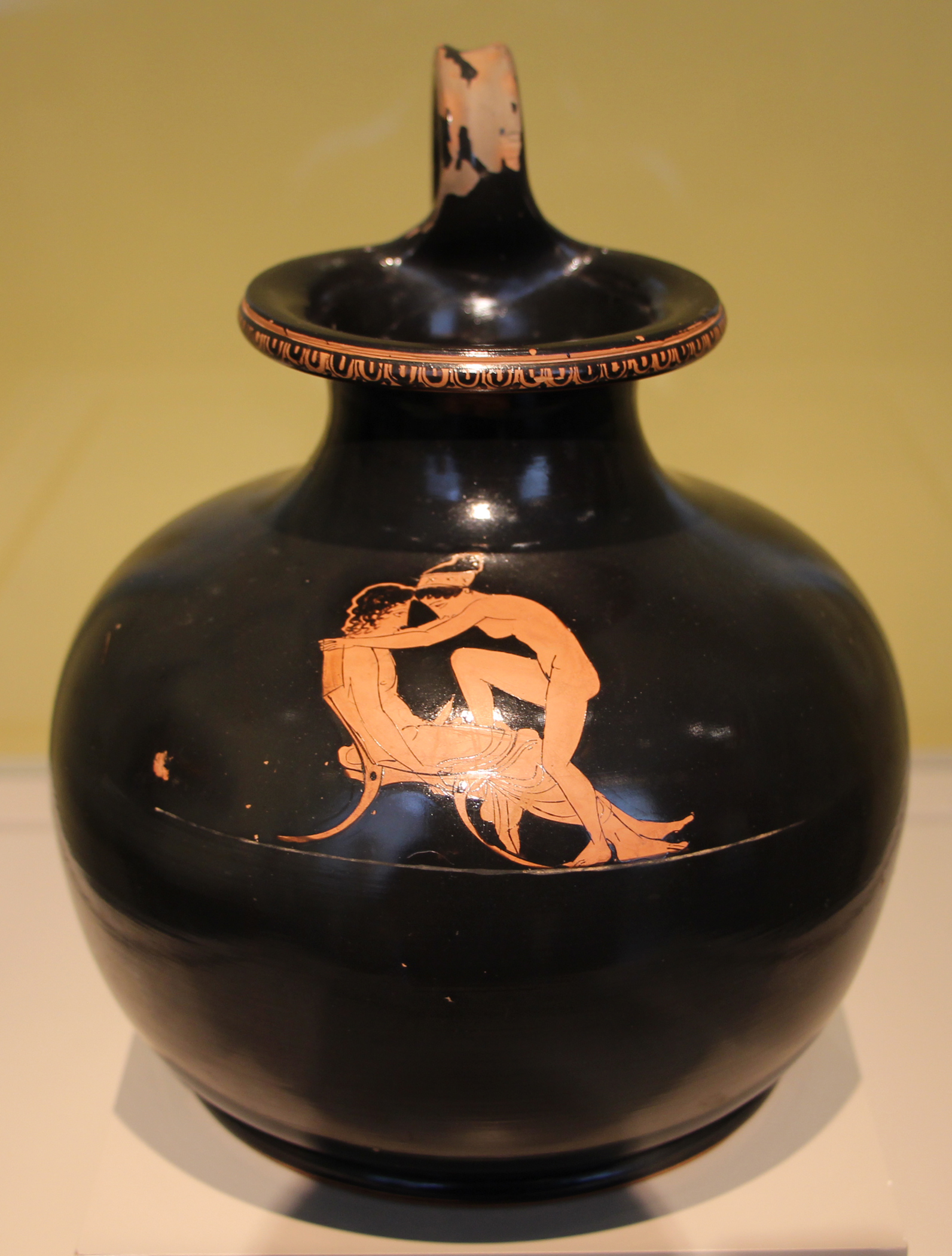
View of the oinochoe in the current exhibition at the Altes Museum, Berlin

The oinochoe by the Shuvalov Painter in the collection of Antikensammlung Berlin (inventory number F 2414) is an erotic depiction from ancient Greek vase painting.

== Description ==
The rather small oinochoe was found in Locri, in southern Italy. The clay jug is covered with a highly glossy black clay slip almost in its entirety, thus rendering the single small painted red-figure scene particularly striking. It is positioned on the upper part of the vessel's body, directly opposite the handle.

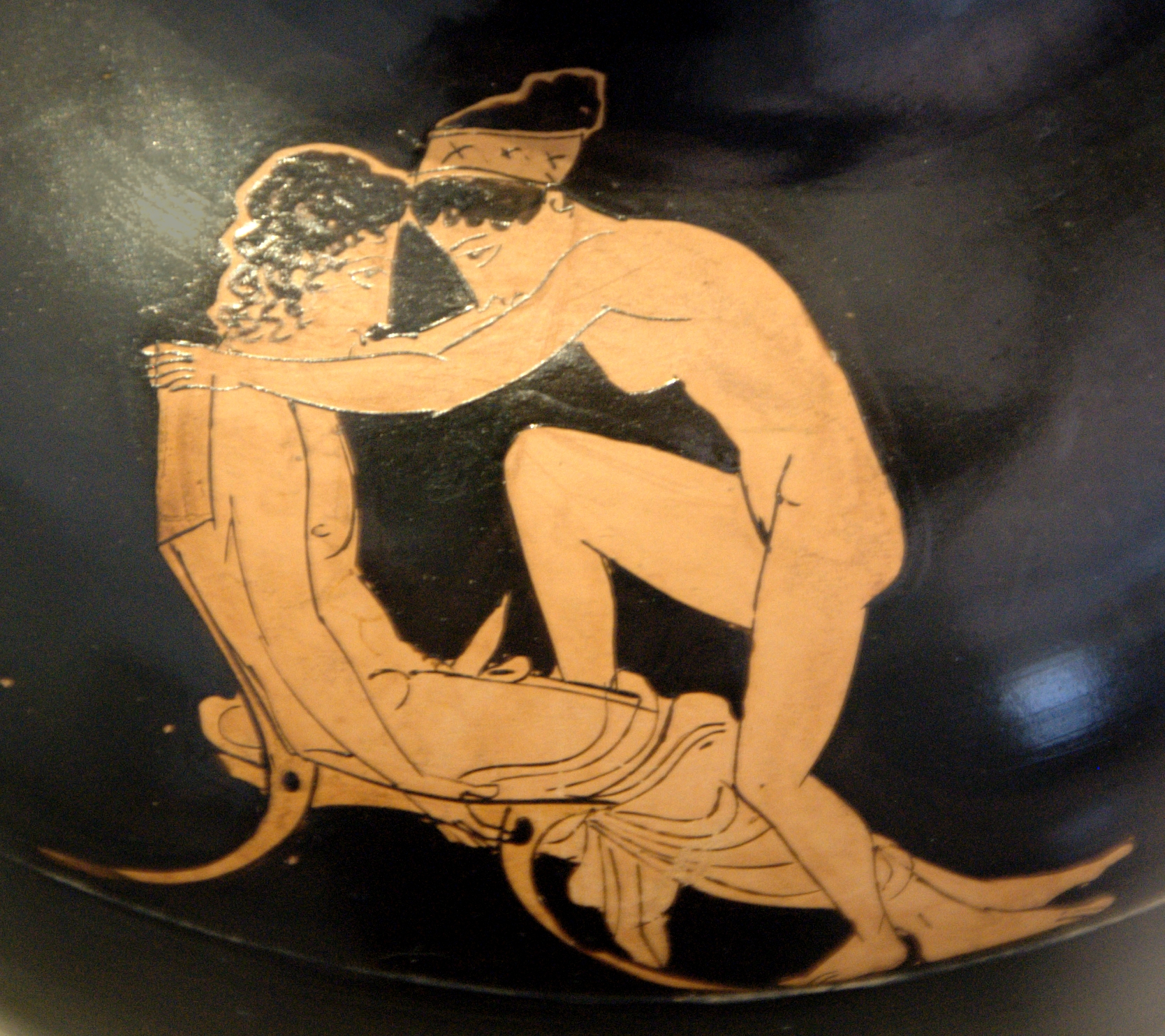
Close-up of the painting

The image depicts a young man and a girl or woman immediately before sexual intercourse. The youth of the man is clearly indicated by his long curls hanging by his temple and neck. He is seated, tightly squeezed into a leather chair, his hands holding onto the seat. His cloak has been pulled down, covering only his legs. His legs are pressed together and outstretched; his clearly visible erect penis shows that he is ready for union with the female. It seems clear that the initiative lies with the woman who is depicted totally nude, with the exception of a broad hair band. She is holding onto the chair's backrest, her right leg is lifted up, indicating that as the next step she is about to sit on the man's lap. The fact that their gazes meet and their heads touch indicates a connection, even intimacy or tenderness, which may be somewhat unexpected in such a scene. The known norms and conventions of Athenian society suggest that she must be a common prostitute or, at best, a hetaera. An honourable Athenian citizen woman would never be depicted in such a fashion, further, she would not be permitted to take the initiative in a sexual relationship with a man. Thus, the scene ought to be set in a brothel, or, perhaps more likely, at a symposium. The tense posture and shy look of the young man have been suggested to imply that he is sexually inexperienced, perhaps even that the scene depicts his first introduction to heterosexual activity.

For stylistic reasons, the oinochoe is attributed to the Shuvalov Painter, who ran a workshop in Athens between 440 and 410 BC. The vase is dated to 430, at the latest 420, BC. It is very well preserved, only on the lip and handle is some of the glossy slip missing, as is a small part of its base. The particular shape is quite rare. The vessel is 19 cm high and has a diameter of 15.5 cm (without the handle). It was acquired for the Antikensammlung in 1828, from a collector called "von Koller". At present, it is on display at Antikensammlung exhibition in the Altes Museum, in case 17,3 (section Fest und Gelage – "feast and symposium"). Because of its fine painting and high quality, the vase is one of the most frequently illustrated works of Greek vase painting

== See also ==
- History of erotic depictions
- Ancient Greek eros

== Bibliography ==
- Adrienne Lezzi-Hafter: Der Schuwalow-Maler. Eine Kannenwerkstatt der Parthenonzeit., Mainz 1976.
- Martin Maischberger: Weinkanne des Schuwalow-Malers: Liebespaar, in: Andreas Scholl (ed.): Die Antikensammlung: Altes Museum. Pergamonmuseum, von Zabern, Mainz 2007, p. 76f. ISBN 978-3-8053-2449-6.
- Corpus Vasorum Antiquorum Berlin 3, Plate 145, 2; 146, 1.2.
