= Marathonius =

In Greek mythology, Marathonius or Marathonios (Ancient Greek: Μαραθώνιος) may refer to two distinct characters:

- Marathonius, the 13th king of Sicyon who reigned for 30 years. His predecessor was Orthopolis and himself was succeeded by Marathus. During his reign, Cecrops Diphyes became the first king of Attica.

Regnal titles
Preceded by Orthopolis	King of Sicyon; 30 years	Succeeded by Marathus

- Marathonios, the Locrian son of Deucalion and Pyrrha, the legendary progenitors of the Greek race. He was the brother of Orestheus and Pronous, father of Hellen.
