= Shuvalov Painter =

5th-century BC Greek vase painter

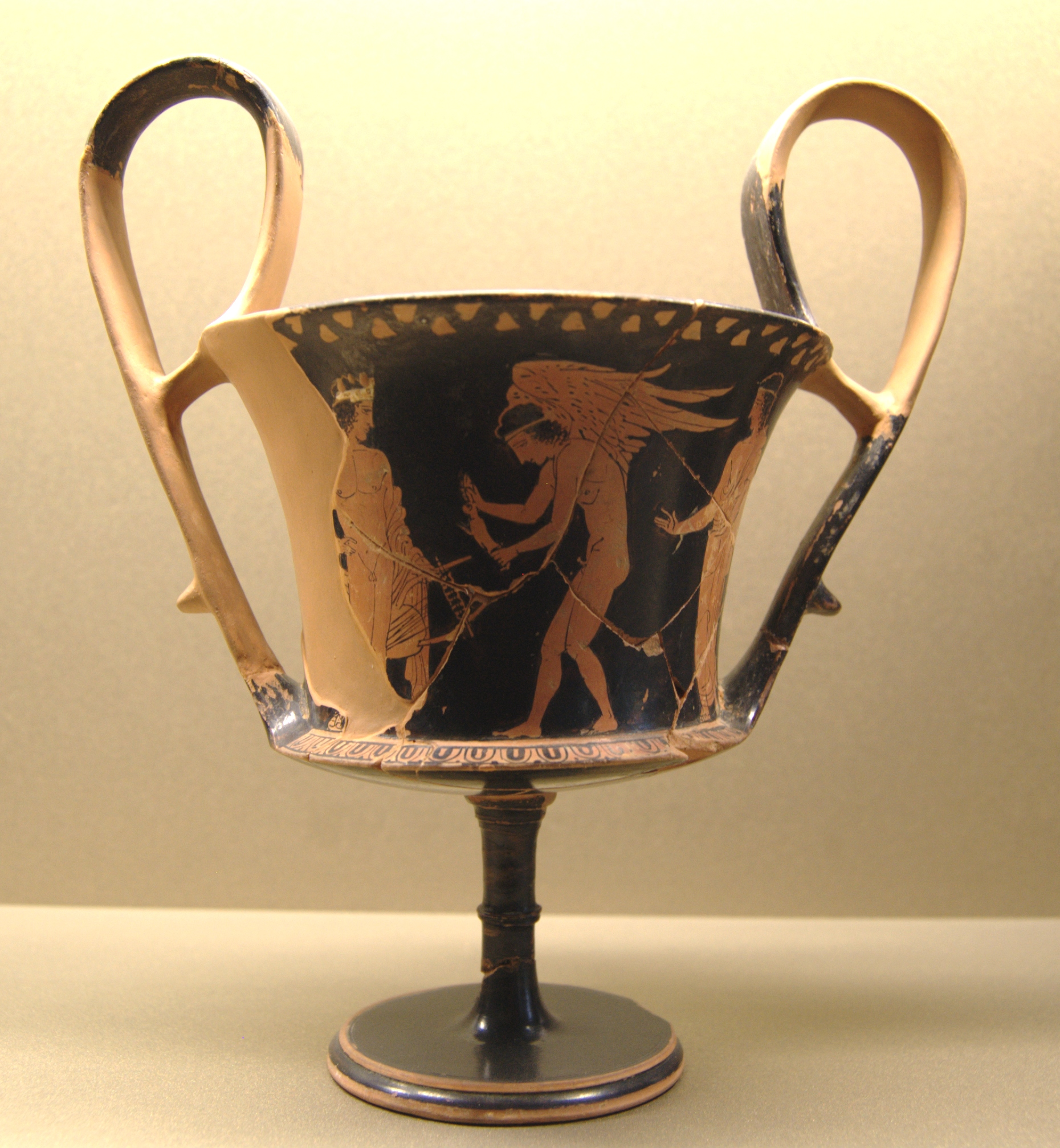
Kantharos, Paris, Louvre CA 1587: Eros and musician playing the lyra, circa 420/10 BC.

The Shuvalov Painter was an Attic vase painter of the red-figure style, active between 440 and 410 BC, i.e. in the High Classical period (Parthenon period) in Magna Graecia.

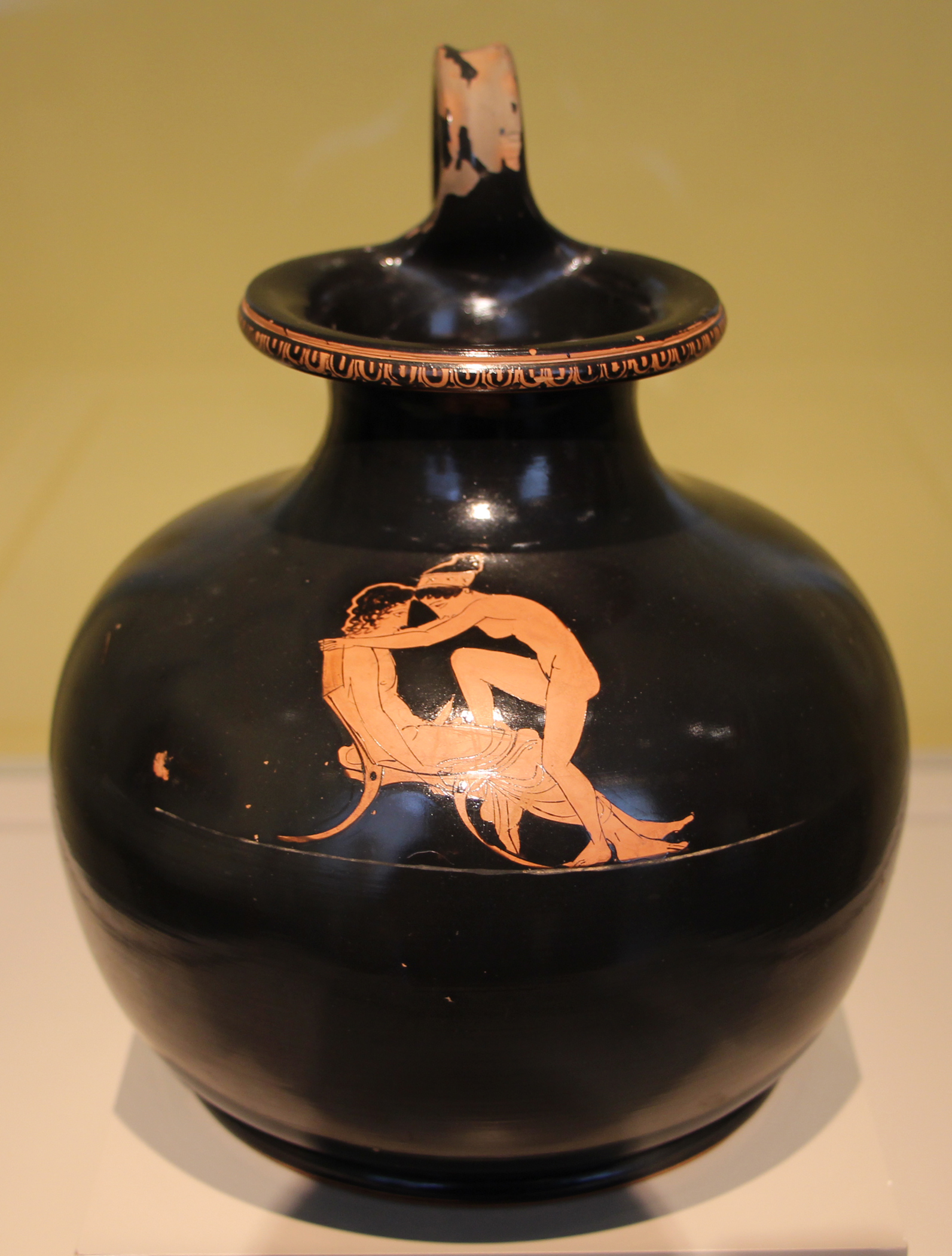
Oinochoe, erotic scene with young man and hetaira; Antikensammlung (F 2414) Berlin

The Shuvalov painter's conventional name was allocated by John Beazley, who chose for a name vase an amphora that is now at the Hermitage Museum, St. Petersburg. It had been acquired in the eighteenth century by the collector Ivan Ivanovich Shuvalov.

Most of some eighty works ascribed to the Shuvalov Painter were discovered in Italy, mainly in Campania and Lucania. He mainly painted smaller vessels. The Shuvalov Painter is considered the successor of the Mannheim Painter at the same workshop. He appears to have worked in the same workshop as Aison, the painter of the Alexander Group and the Eretria Painter. His paintings depict lively small figures, often with intense gazes. His works, whether depicting mythological scenes or themes from everyday life, are counted among the best of their time. John Boardman argues that his paintings have a tendency to be somewhat shallow and facile.

An oinochoe by the Shuvalov Painter on display in Berlin is one of the most famous erotic works of ancient Greek vase painting.

== Bibliography ==
- John Beazley: Attic red-figure vase-painters. 2nd ed. Oxford 1963.
- Adrienne Lezzi-Hafter: Der Schuwalow-Maler. Eine Kannenwerkstatt der Parthenonzeit, Mainz 1976.
- John Boardman: Rotfigurige Vasen aus Athen. Die klassische Zeit, von Zabern, Mainz 1991 (Kulturgeschichte der Antiken Welt, Vol 48), especially p. 101f. ISBN 3-8053-1262-8.
- Martin Maischberger: Weinkanne des Schuwalow-Malers: Liebespaar, in: Andreas Scholl (ed.): Die Antikensammlung: Altes Museum. Pergamonmuseum, von Zabern, Mainz 2007, S. 76f., ISBN 978-3-8053-2449-6.
