= Cosmas of Aphrodisia =

Italian Roman Catholic saint

Saint Cosmas

Martyr and Bishop of Aphrodisia
- Born: Palermo, Sicily, Italy
- Died: 1160; Sicily, Italy
- Venerated in: Roman Catholic Church
- Canonized: Cult approved by Pope Leo XIII
- Feast: 10 September

Cosmas was Bishop of Aphrodisia and martyr. Born at Palermo, on the island of Sicily, and was appointed and ordained Bishop of Aphrodisia, ordained by Pope Eugene III. When the Saracens invaded the island and captured his see, Cosmas was seized and suffered martyrdom.
