= Paregoros =

Greek personification of consolation

In ancient Greek religion, Paregoros (Ancient Greek: Παρηγορος, lit. 'Comforter') is the name of a goddess venerated at Megara. According to the geographer Pausanias, there was a statue, by the sculptor Praxiteles, of a goddess in the temple of Aphrodite at Megara, which the Megarians called "Consoler" (Paregoros).
