= Calchinia =

Daughter of Leucippus in Greek mythology

In Greek mythology, Calchinia (Ancient Greek: Καλχινίᾳ) was a Sicyonian princess as a daughter of King Leucippus of Aegialea. She consorted with the sea-god Poseidon and bore him a son, Peratus. Leucippus reared his grandson and with the former's death, he handed over the kingdom to Peratus.
