= Apis (Greek mythology) =

Ancient Greek male name

Apis (/ˈeɪpɪs/; Ancient Greek: Ἄπις derived from apios "far-off" or "of the pear-tree") is the name of a figure, or several figures, appearing in the earliest antiquity according to Greek mythology and historiography. It is uncertain exactly how many figures of the name Apis are to be distinguished, particularly due to variation of their genealogies. A common element is that an Apis was an early king in the Peloponnesus that had a territory named after himself and that Apis was often, but not always, ascribed an Egyptian origin. For the sake of convenience, the variant myths are presented here as if they dealt with separate characters.

- Apis, king of Argos. He was a son of Phoroneus by the nymph Teledice, and brother of Niobe. During his reign, he established a tyrannical government and called the Peloponnesus after his own name Apia, but was eventually killed in a conspiracy headed by Thelxion, king of Sparta, and Telchis.
- Apis, king of Sicyon and son of Telchis.
- Apis, according to Aeschylus was a seer and healer and a son of Apollo. In The Suppliants, the Argive king Pelasgus, son of Palaechthon, relates that Apis once came from Naupactus and freed Argos from throngs of snakes, which "Earth, defiled by the pollution of bloody deeds of old, had caused to spring up" and plague the country. Apis "worked the cure by sorcery and spells to the content of the Argive land." To commemorate his deed, the relieved territory was henceforth referred to as "the Apian land" (Apia khōra) after his name. Note that "the Apian land" appears to comprise not just Argos: Pelasgus describes his kingdom as stretching so far as the northernmost boundaries of Greece, and comprising the territories of Paeonia and Dodona.
- Apis, son of Jason, was a native of Pallantium, Arcadia. He participated in the funeral games of Azan and was accidentally killed by Aetolus, who ran him over with the chariot. For the murder, Aetolus was sent into exile by the children of Apis. Apollodorus relates the same of Apis, son of Phoroneus, apparently confounding the two mythological namesakes.
