= Apis of Argos =

King of Argos in Greek mythology

Apis (/ˈeɪpɪs/; Ancient Greek: Ἄπις derived from apios "far-off" or "of the pear-tree") was a king of Argos in Greek mythology.

== Family ==
Apis was a son of Phoroneus by the nymph Teledice, or Cinna, or Cerdo, or Perimede and brother of Niobe. According to a scholiast on Euripides's Orestes, he was the son of Phoroneus by his first wife Peitho ("Persuasion") and brother to Niobe, Aegialeus, and Europs.

== Reign ==
Apollodorus reports that during his reign, Apis established a tyrannical government and called the Peloponnesus Apia, after his own name, and that he was eventually killed in a conspiracy headed by Thelxion and Telchis. In another passage Apollodorus states that Apis, the son of Phoroneus, was killed by Aetolus; Pausanias, however, gives the latter story in relation to Apis, son of Jason, who was killed by Aetolus during the funeral games celebrated in honor of Azanes. Argus Panoptes, a descendant of his sister Niobe, avenged his murder by putting Thelxion and Telchis to death.

APIS' CHRONOLOGY OF REIGN ACCORDING TO VARIOUS SOURCES
Kings of Argos	Regnal Years		Castor	Regnal Years		Syncellus	Regnal Years	Apollodorus	Hyginus	Tatian	Pausanias
Precessor	1652	60 winters & summers	Phoroneus	1649.5	60 winters & summers	Phoroneus	1650	Phoroneus	-do-	-do-	-do-
Apis	1622	35 winters & summers	Apis	1619.5	35 winters & summers	Apis	1625	Apis	-do-	-do-	-do-
Successor	1604.5	70 winters & summers	Argus	1602	70 winters & summers	Argus	1600	Argus	-do-	Argeius or Criasus	Argus

== Serapis ==
Apis, the son of Phoroneus, is said, after his death, to have been worshiped as a god under the name of Serapis (Σάραπις). This confusion is still more manifest in the tradition, that Apis gave his kingdom of Argos to his brother, and went to Egypt, where he reigned for several years afterwards. Apis is spoken of as one of the earliest lawgivers among the Greeks. Both these stories show that Egyptian myths were mixed up with the story of Apis, see Apis (Egyptian mythology).

== Notes ==
Regnal titles
Preceded by Phoroneus	King of Argos; 1622 BC or 1625 BC – 1600 BC	Succeeded by Argus
