= Aegyrus =

In Greek mythology, Aegyrus (Ancient Greek: Αἴγυρος) or Aegydrus was the sixth king of Sicyon who reigned for 34 years.

== Family ==
Aegyrus was the son and heir of King Thelxion, descendant of the city's founder Aegialeus (an autochthon). Aegyrus was succeeded in the throne by his son Thurimachus.

Regnal titles
Preceded by Thelxion	King of Sicyon; 34 years	Succeeded by Thurimachus
