= Telchis =

Multiple Greek mythological figures

"Telchis" is also the singular form of "Telchines".

In Greek mythology, Telchis (Ancient Greek: Τελχίς, lit. 'one of the Telchines') may refer to two different or the same characters:

- Telchis or Telchin, the third king of Sicyon who reigned for 20 years. He was the son and successor of Europs, thus grandson of the primeval king Aegialeus. Telchis' heir was his own son Apis to whom was subsequently born Thelxion.

Regnal titles
Preceded by Europs	King of Sicyon; 20 years	Succeeded by Apis

- Telchis, an Argive companion of Thelxion. The two are said to have deposed and killed the Argive Apis, son of Phoroneus and Teledice, who had left no offspring. Apis' death was later avenged on them by Argus Panoptes.
