= Europs (mythology) =

Greek mythological character

In Greek mythology, the name Europs (Ancient Greek: Εὔρωψ, romanized: Eúrops) may refer to:

- Europs, son of the autochthon Aegialeus, father of Telchis and grandfather of Apis, all of whom formed a legacy of the primeval kings of Sicyon according to a local legend. He was said to be the second ruler of Aegialea and have reigned for 45 years.
- Europs, son of Phoroneus whom Herophanes of Troezen wrote of as illegitimate; Pausanias concluded that Herophanes' account was plausible, since otherwise Phoroneus' kingdom would not have passed to Argus. Europs' own son Hermion was the presumed eponym of Hermione, Argolis.

Regnal titles
Preceded by Aegialeus	King of Sicyon; 45 years	Succeeded by Telchis
