= Aegialeus (King of Sicyon) =

Mythical king of Sicyon

Aegialeus (Ancient Greek: Αἰγιαλεύς, romanized: Aigialeus, lit. 'derived from αἰγιαλός aigialos 'beach, sea-shore') also Aegealeus, or Egialeus, in classical Greek semi-mythical historiography was considered the original settler of the Peloponnese and the founder and first ruler of the city-state of Aegialea, later known to history as Sicyon.

== Reign and descent ==
The primary source for the early history of Sicyon was the writing of Castor of Rhodes, known from excerpts cited or utilized in later authors, such as Pausanias, Africanus, Eusebius, Jerome, and George Syncellus. Castor stated that Aegialeus' reign as first king of Sicyon lasted for 52 years, a few generations before Inachus founded Argos; that the Peloponessus was called Aegialea after him; and that he was succeeded by Europs. Eusebius further asserted that Aegialeus' reign was said to begin in the 15th year of Belus' reign in Assyria, although his colleague Jerome calculated it slightly later.

The work Bibliotheke ("The Library") also cited Castor, however it presented a distorted account giving the primacy to Argos rather than Sicyon, with an altogether different genealogy making Aegialeus a son of Inachus. According to this variant, Aegialeus died childless, his mother was an Oceanid named Melia, and his brother was Phoroneus. In some accounts, he was the offspring of Phoroneus by his first wife Peitho ("Persuasion") and brother to Apia (Apis).

Regnal titles
Preceded by -	King of Sicyon; 52 years	Succeeded by Europs

== Mythology ==
=== Pausanias' account ===
In his Description of Greece, one of the earliest sources to make use of Castor, Pausanias wrote:

The Sicyonians, the neighbours of the Corinthians at this part of the border, say about their own land that Aegialeus was its first and aboriginal inhabitant, that the district of the Peloponnesus still called Aegialus was named after him because he reigned over it, and that he founded the city Aegialea on the plain. Their citadel, they say, was where is now their sanctuary of Athena; further, that Aegialeus begat Europs, Europs Telchis, and Telchis Apis.

=== Apollodorus' account ===
In the work Bibliotheke ("The Library"), we read:

Ocean and Tethys had a son Inachus, after whom a river in Argos is called Inachus. He and Melia, daughter of Ocean, had sons, Phoroneus, and Aegialeus. Aegialeus having died childless, the whole country was called Aegialia; and Phoroneus, reigning over the whole land afterwards named Peloponnese, begat Apis and Niobe by a nymph Teledice. Apis converted his power into a tyranny and named the Peloponnese after himself Apia; but being a stern tyrant he was conspired against and slain by Thelxion and Telchis. He left no child, and being deemed a god was called Sarapis. But Niobe had by Zeus (and she was the first mortal woman with whom Zeus cohabited) a son Argus, and also, so says Acusilaus, a son Pelasgus, after whom the inhabitants of the Peloponnese were called Pelasgians. However, Hesiod says that Pelasgus was a son of the soil.
