= Orchomenus =

Orchomenus or Orchomenos or Orkhomenos (Ancient Greek: Ὀρχομενός) may refer to:

== Greek mythology ==
- Orchomenus (mythology), the name of several distinct figures

== Ancient Greek geography ==
- Orchomenus (Arcadia), also called the Arcadian Orchomenus, a city of Arcadia
- Orchomenus (Boeotia), also called the Minyean Orchomenus, a city of Boeotia
- Orchomenus (Euboea), a town of ancient Euboea
- Orchomenus (Thessaly), a town of ancient Thessaly

== History ==
- Battle of Orchomenus, fought in 85 BCE near the Minyean Orchomenus
