= Viktoria Square =

Coordinates: 37°59′35″N 23°43′46″E

Victoria Square
- Πλατεία Βικτωρίας
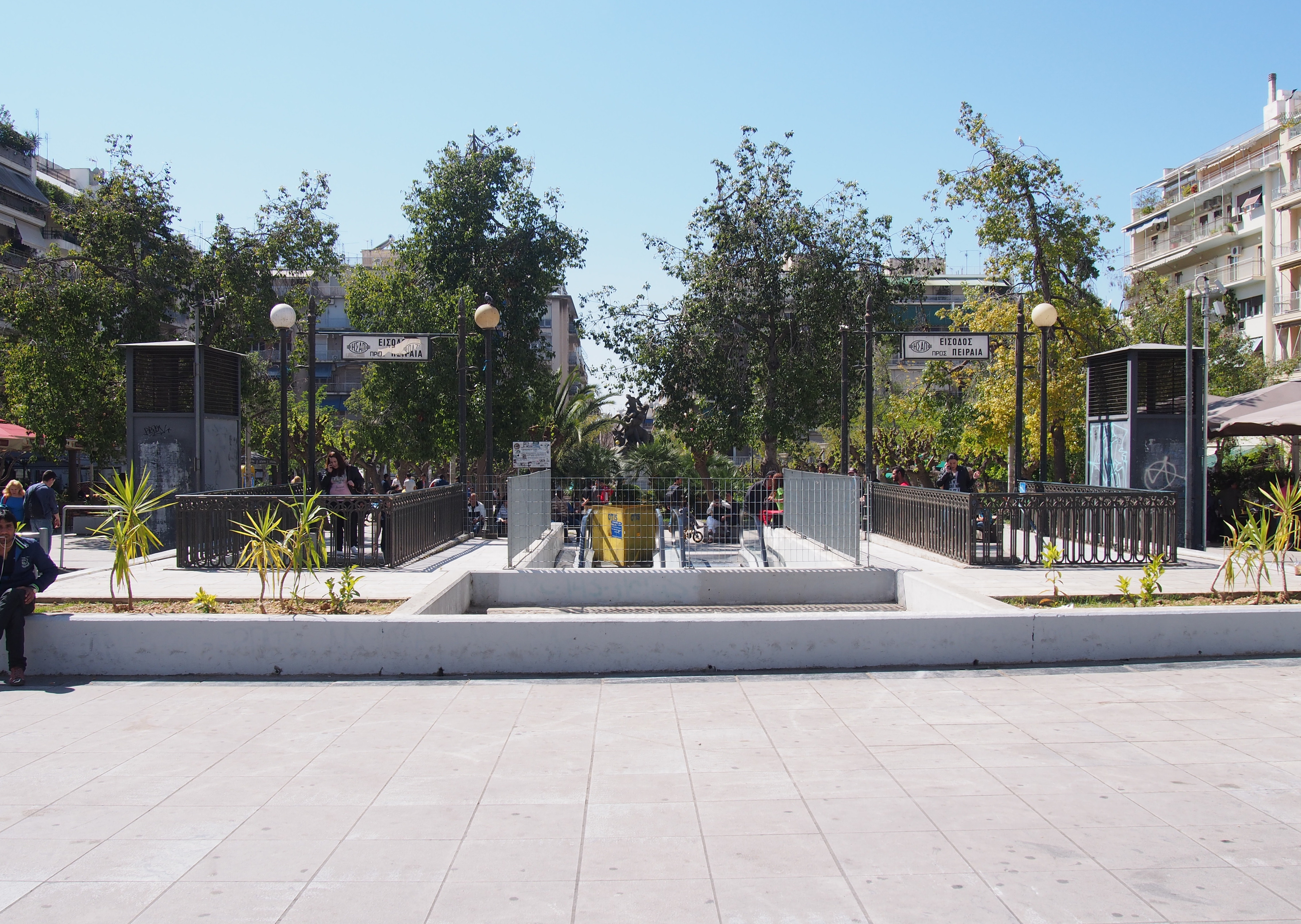
- Former names: Kyriakou Square

General information
- Type: Open square
- Architectural style: Neoclassicism
- Location: Athens, Greece

Victoria Square (Plateia Viktorias as formally transliterated from Greek Πλατεία Βικτωρίας) is a large square in the Municipality of Athens, Greece situated between 3rd September and Aristotelous streets, and crossing Hayden street. Formerly known as Kyriakou Square, it was renamed Victoria in honor of the Queen of the United Kingdom on the occasion of the annexation of the Ionian Islands to Greece in 1864, as a gift to the enthronement of the Queen's nephew, Prince Christian William Ferdinand Adolf George of Denmark, later George I of Greece. Victoria metro station on the metro line 1 is situated under the square. It features on the Northern Cycling Corridor of the Kifissia–Faliron Bay bicycle route plan, the main future cycling corridor of the city. In its center is the sculptural complex Theseus saving Hippodamia by Johannes Pfuhl (1846–1914).

== Victoria Square neighbourhood ==
With Victoria square at its center, the eponymous neighbourhood is an official municipal neighbourhood, extending to Patission Street on the East, Kodrigktonos Street on the North, Acharnon Street on the West, and Ioulianou Street on the South. It lies therefore outside, but on the edge of the Daktylios, the low emission zone of Athens.

Administratively, this Athenian municipal neighbourhood belongs to the larger Plateia Attikis municipal district (together with Aristotelous on its north, Agios Panteleimon on its north west, and Plateia Attikis on its west). part of the 6th municipal community. The other neighbourghoods that border it are Agios Georgios Kypselis on its north east, Pedio Areos - Scholi Evelpidon on its east, Mouseio on its south east, and Ioulianou-Filadelfeias on its south.

Since the 1940s the neighbourhood has been one of Athens' best and most sought after, comparable to Kolonaki. On its streets there are important examples of classical modernism, such as the Spathari block (Mavrommatia street), the Sarantopoulos block (27 Derigni street), as well as the buildings on Heiden 1 and 2. The luxurious apartments of these buildings were addressed to the bourgeoisie of Athens at the time, since they provided a variety of amenities and had high quality architectural elements.

The OTE building by the architect Kostas Kitsikis, that includes a 58-metre tower is a landmark of the area, and is considered a prime example of the 1960s architectural modernism of Athens.

Gradually, the area began to decline, largely due to its abandonment by its original inhabitants. During the years of crisis the square got occupied by an illegal immigrants settlement, leading to the neighborhood to be generally regarded as degraded and facing problems of crime.

The square and its surroundings are now being revamped along with the general upgrading of downtown Athens. In particular, the restoration of the landmark OTE building "Patision 85", to soon relocate the telecommunications museum is to be noted. Close to the National Archaeological Museum, the neighbourhood could benefit from the urban plan for its expansion.

=== Cultural places ===
The neighbourhood hosts:

- Hellenic Motor Museum
- Poreia Theatre
- Alkyonis Theatre
- Poli Theatre
- Art 63 Theatre
- Cinobo Patision (cinema)
- Trianon cinema
- Eos Gallery
- Match Point Art ‘N More gallery

== In the arts ==
- Sofka Zinovieff "loved writing about Victoria Square" in her 2025 novel Stealing Dad.
- A 1995-1996 painting by Dimos Skoulakis entitled Victoria Station – Stairs, exhibited at the National Gallery, magnifies Victoria Metro Station.

== Gallery ==
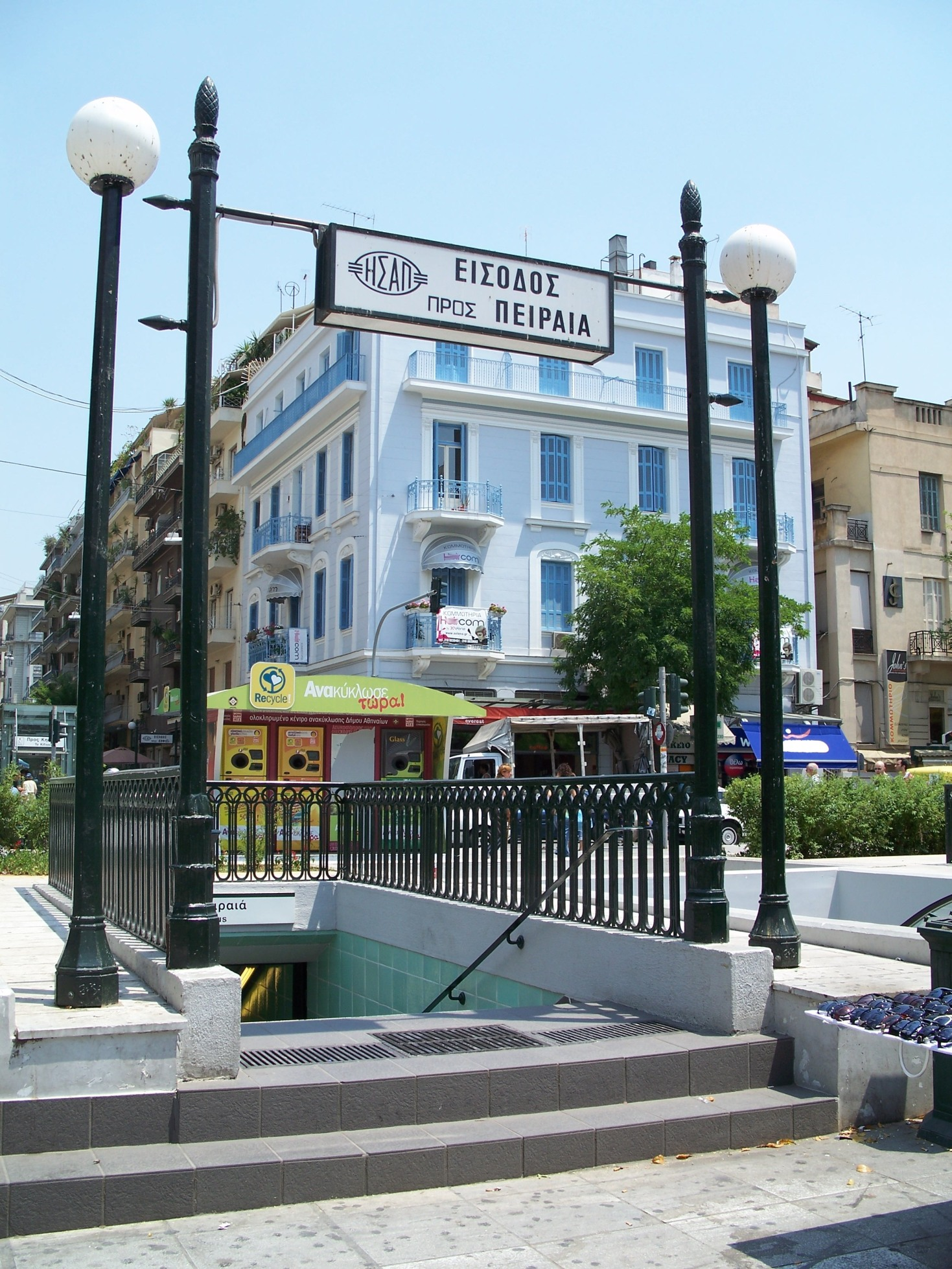
An entrance to the Metro station

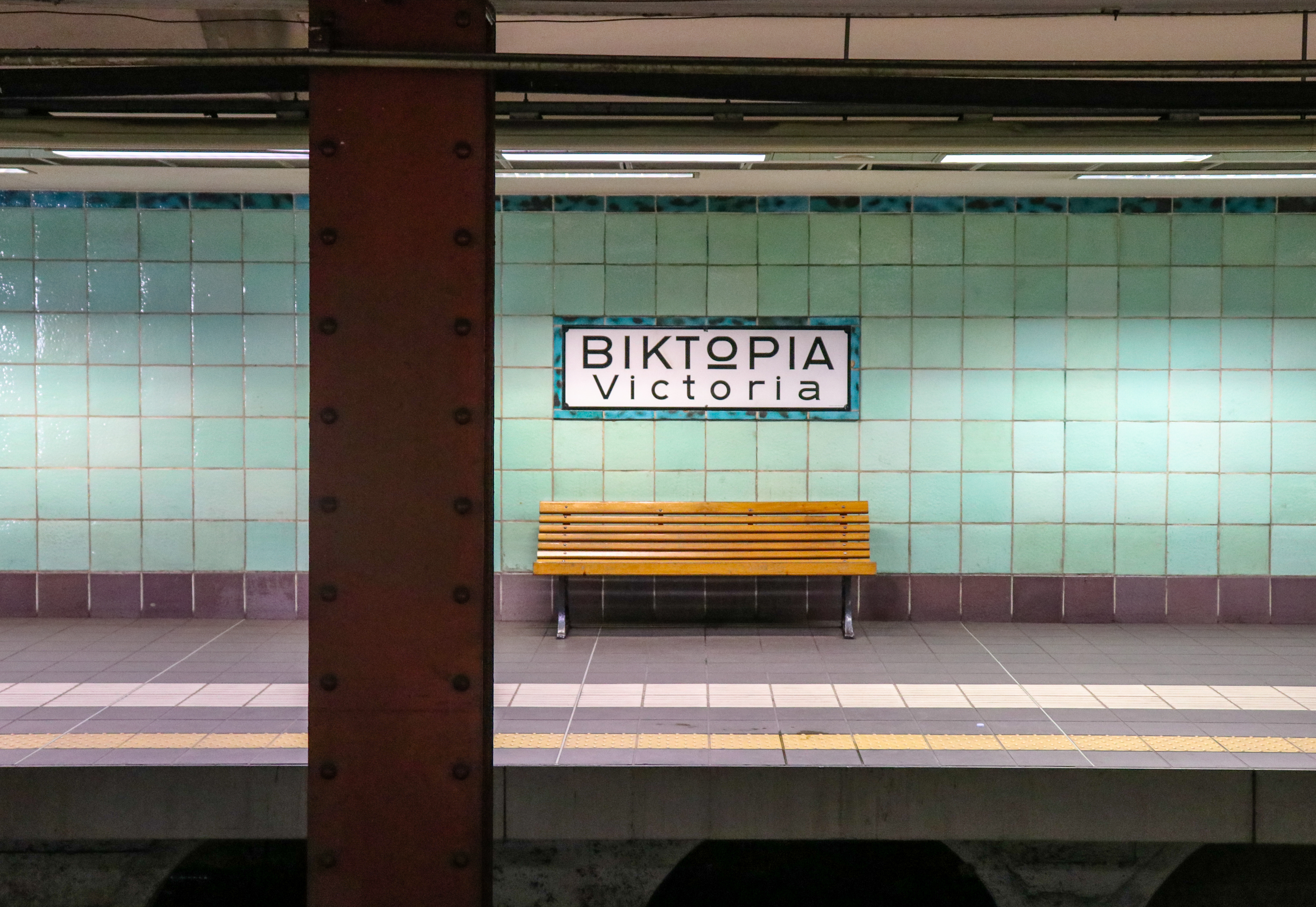
The Metro station

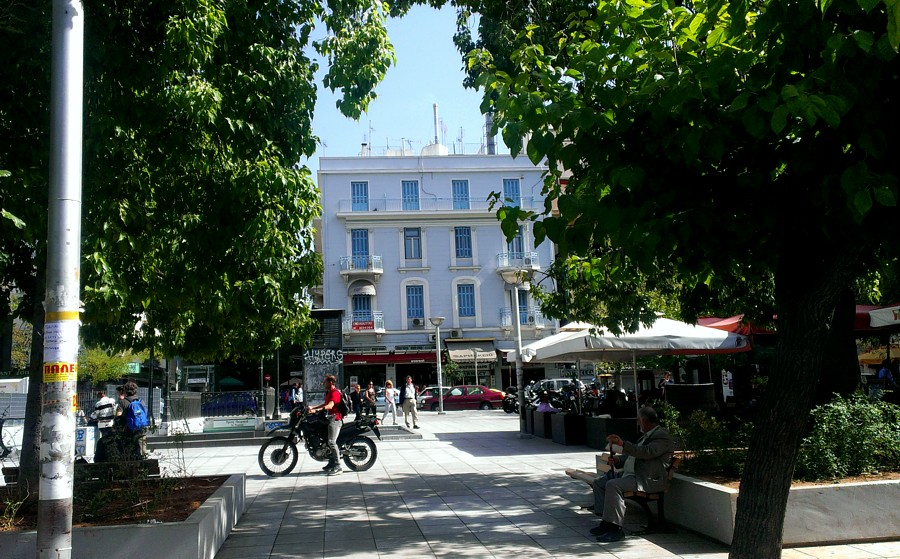
A view of the square

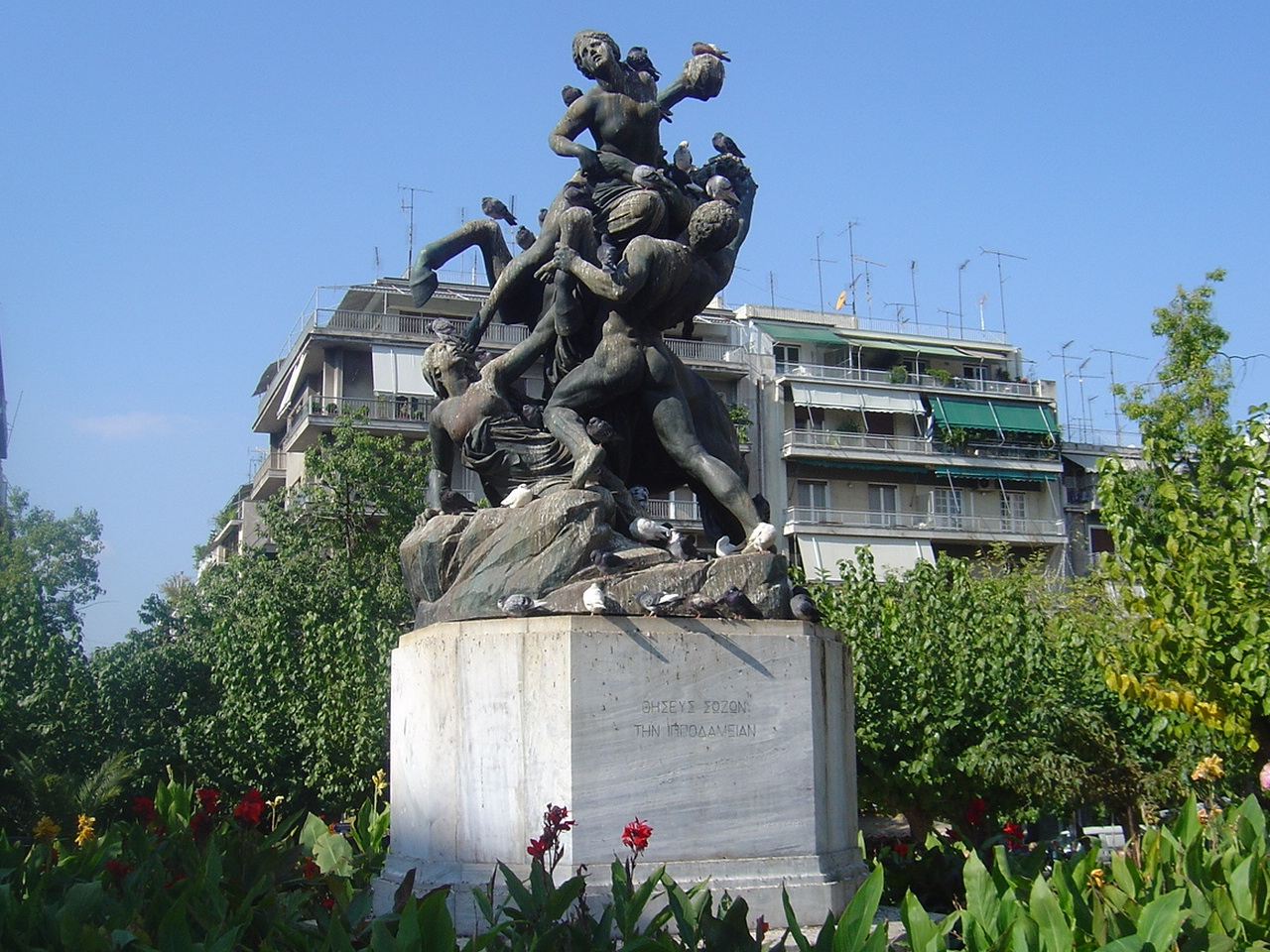
The sculptural complex at the center of the square
