= Tetrapolis =

Tetrapolis (Greek: Τετράπολις '(having) four cities') may refer to:

- Tetrapolis (Attica), a district comprising four cities in ancient Attica, Greece
- Doric Tetrapolis, a group of four cities in ancient Doris, Greece
- Syrian Tetrapolis, a region of the Seleucid Empire
- Antioch by itself was also sometimes called Tetrapolis
- Kibyran Tetrapolis in Lycia, see Kibyra
