= Marathon, Greece =

Town in Attica, Greece

Marathon Μαραθώνας
- Municipality
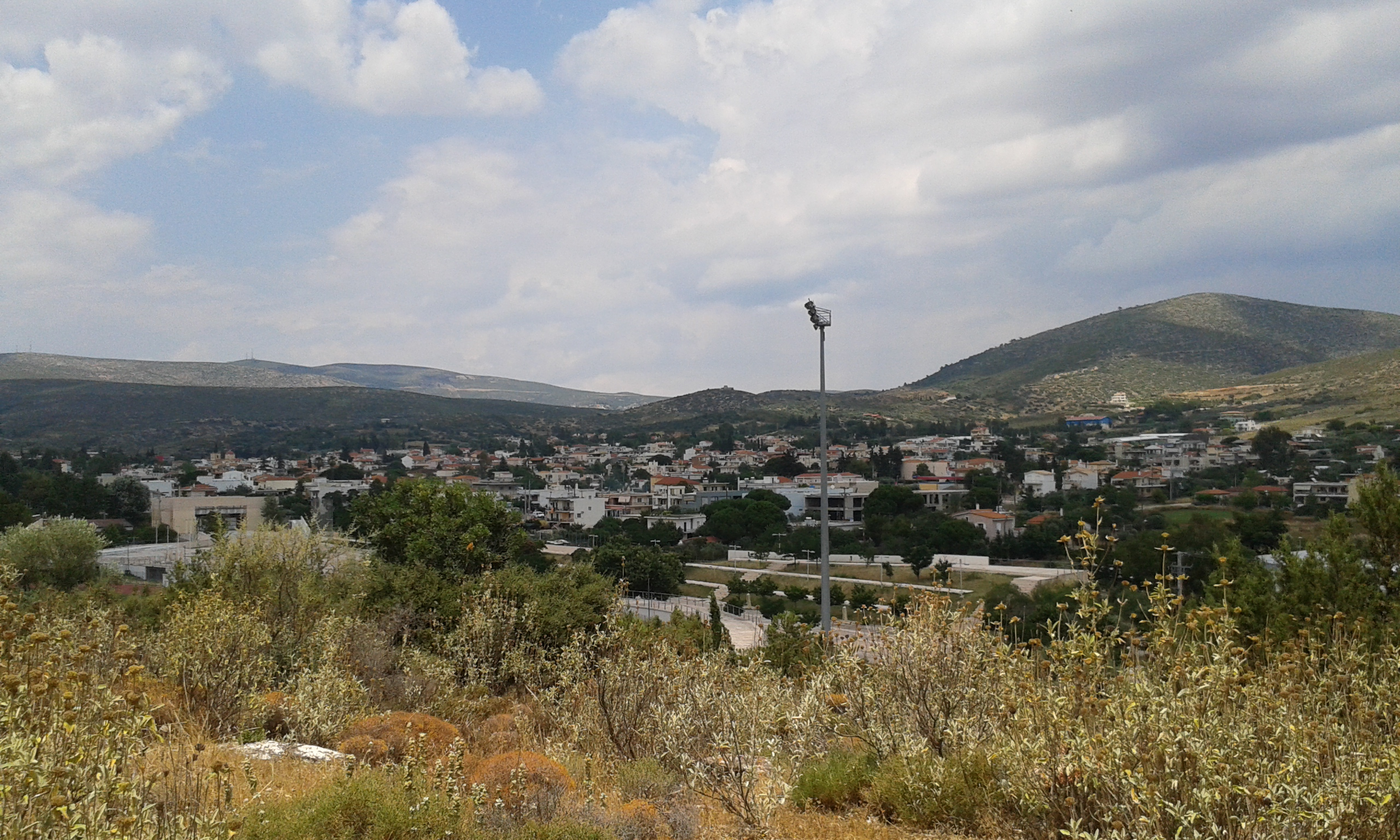
- The town of Marathon

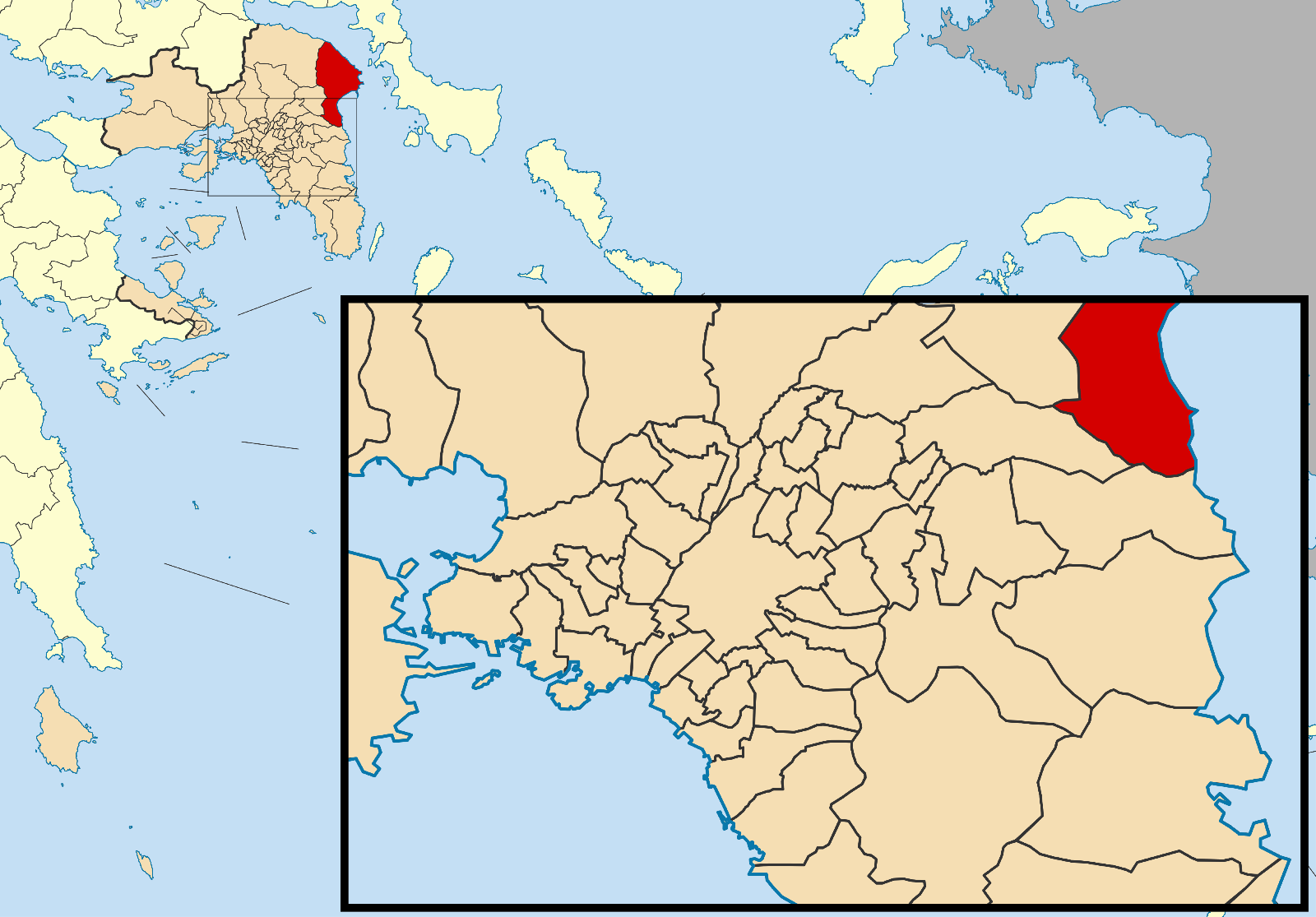

- Location within Greece
- Coordinates: 38°9′12″N 23°57′43″E
- Country: Greece
- Administrative region: Attica
- Regional unit: East Attica

Government
  - Mayor: Stergios Tsirkas (since 2019)

Area
  - Municipality: 222.75 km^{2} (86.00 sq mi)
  - Municipal unit: 97.06 km^{2} (37.48 sq mi)
- Elevation: 33 m (108 ft)

Population (2021)
  - Municipality: 31,331
  - Density: 140.66/km^{2} (364.30/sq mi)
  - Municipal unit: 10,063
  - Municipal unit density: 103.7/km^{2} (268.5/sq mi)
- Time zone: UTC+2 (EET)
  - Summer (DST): UTC+3 (EEST)
- Postal code: 190 07
- Area code: 22940
- Vehicle registration: Z
- Website: www.marathon.gr

Marathon (Demotic Greek: Μαραθώνας, Marathónas; Attic/Katharevousa: Μαραθών, Marathṓn) is a town in Greece and the site of the Battle of Marathon in 490 BCE, in which the outnumbered Athenian army defeated the Persians. Legend has it that Pheidippides, a Greek herald at the battle, was sent running from Marathon to Athens to announce the victory, which is how the marathon running race was conceived in modern times. (Note: In modern Greek the sports event is called Marathonios Dromos (Μαραθώνιος Δρόμος) or simply Marathonios.) Today it is part of East Attica regional unit, in the outskirts of Athens and a popular resort town and center of agriculture.

== History ==
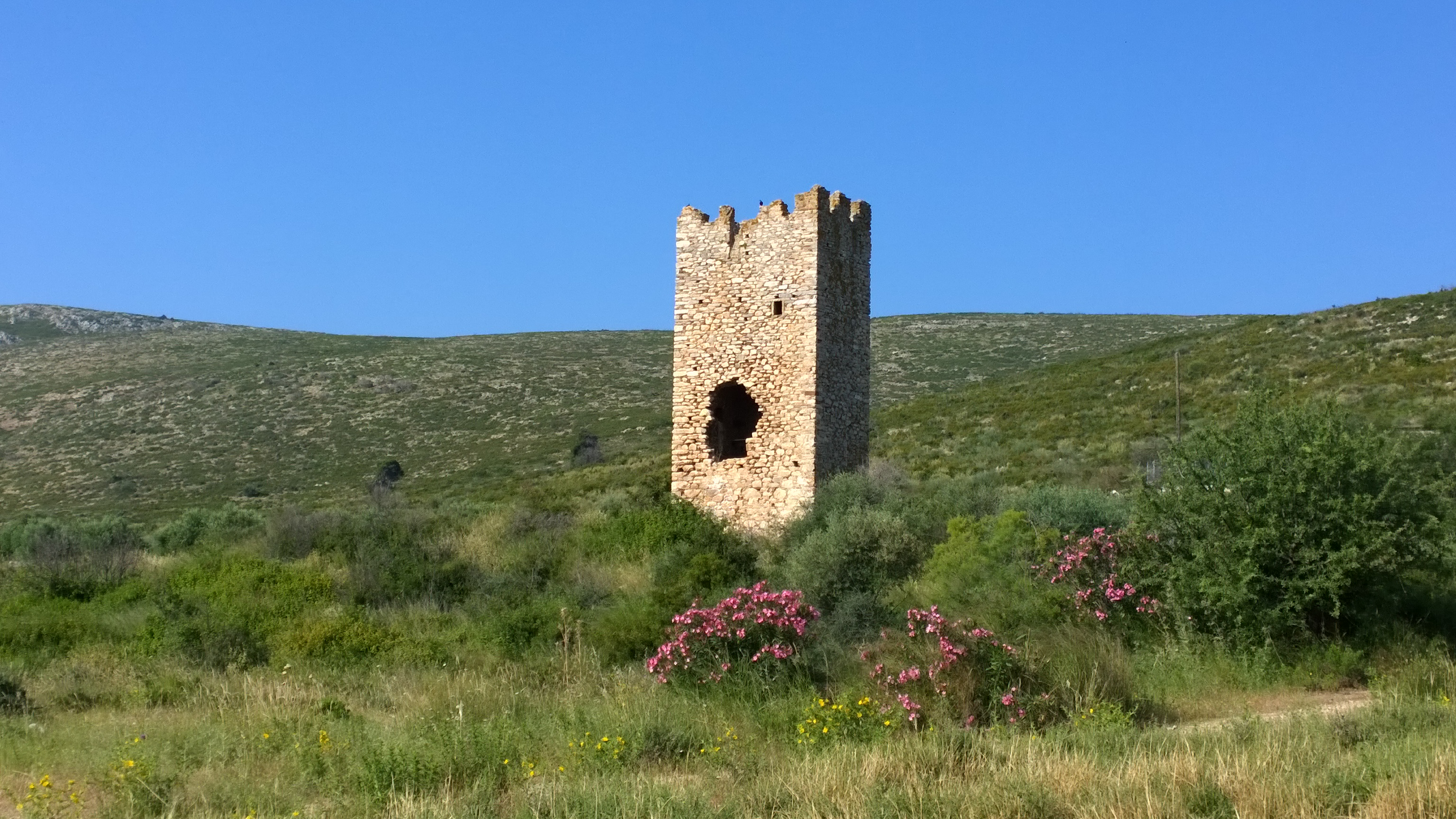
Ruins of a Frankish tower near Marathon

The name "Marathon" (Μαραθών) comes from the herb fennel, called márathon (μάραθον) or márathos (μάραθος) in Ancient Greek, (Note: The Greek word for fennel is first attested in Mycenaean Linear B on tablets MY Ge 602, MY Ge 606 + fr., MY Ge 605 + 607 + frr. + 60Sa + 605b - as 𐀔𐀨𐀶𐀺, ma-ra-tu-wo.) so Marathon literally means "a place full of fennel". It is believed that the town was originally named so because of an abundance of fennel plants in the area.

In ancient times, Marathon (Ancient Greek: Μαραθών) occupied a small plain in the northeast of ancient Attica, which contained four places, Marathon, Probalinthus, Tricorythus, and Oenoe, which originally formed the Tetrapolis, one of the twelve districts into which Attica was divided before the time of Theseus. Here Xuthus, who married the daughter of Erechtheus, is said to have reigned; and here the Heracleidae took refuge when driven out of the Peloponnese, and defeated Eurystheus. The Marathonii claimed to be the first people in Greece who paid divine honours to Heracles, who possessed a sanctuary in the plain. Marathon is also celebrated in the legends of Theseus, who conquered the ferocious bull, which used to devastate the plain. Marathon is mentioned in Homer's Odyssey in a way that implies that it was then a place of importance. In mythology, its name was derived from an eponymous hero Marathon, who is described by Pausanias as a son of Epopeus, king of Sicyon, who fled into Attica in consequence of the cruelty of his father. Plutarch calls him an Arcadian, who accompanied the Dioscuri in their expedition into Attica, and voluntarily devoted himself to death before the battle.

After Theseus united the 12 independent districts of Attica into one state, the name of Tetrapolis gradually fell into disuse; and the four places of which it consisted became Attic demi, Marathon, Tricorythus, and Oenoë belonging to the tribe Aeantis, and Probalinthus to the tribe Pandionis; but Marathon was so superior to the other three, that its name was applied to the whole district down to the latest times. Hence Lucian speaks of "the parts of Marathon about Oenoë".

Few places have obtained such celebrity in the history of the world as Marathon, on account of the victory which the Athenians here gained over the Persians in 490 BCE (Battle of Marathon). After Miltiades (the general of the Greek forces) defeated Darius' Persian forces, the Persians decided to sail from Marathon to Athens in order to sack the unprotected city. Miltiades ordered all his hoplite forces to march "double time" back to Athens, so that by the time Darius' troops arrived they saw the same Greek force waiting for them.

Although the name Marathon had a positive resonance in Europe in the nineteenth century, for some time that was sullied by the Dilessi murders, which happened nearby in 1870.

In the 19th century and beginning of twentieth century the village was inhabited by an Arvanite population.

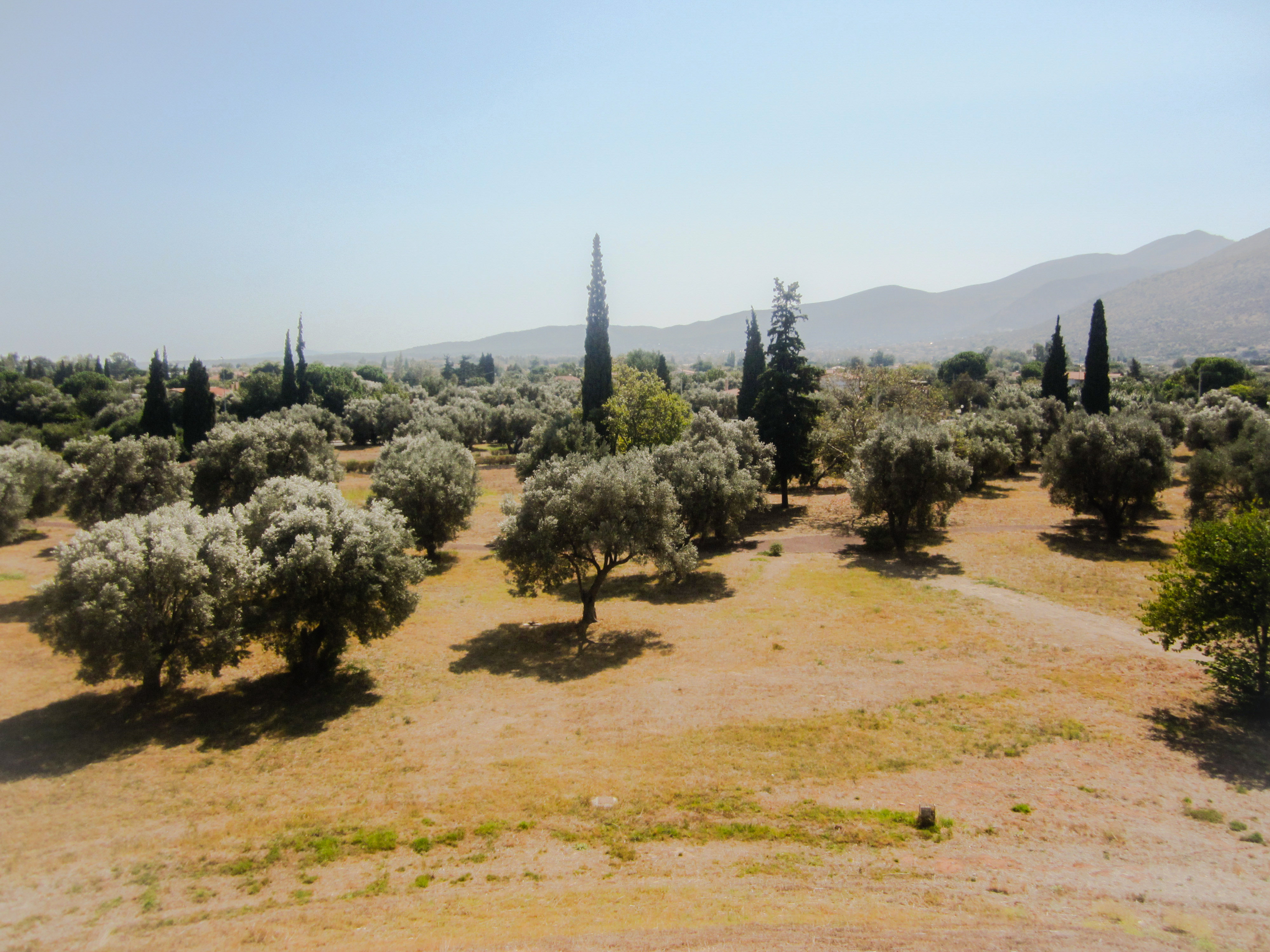
Plain of Marathon

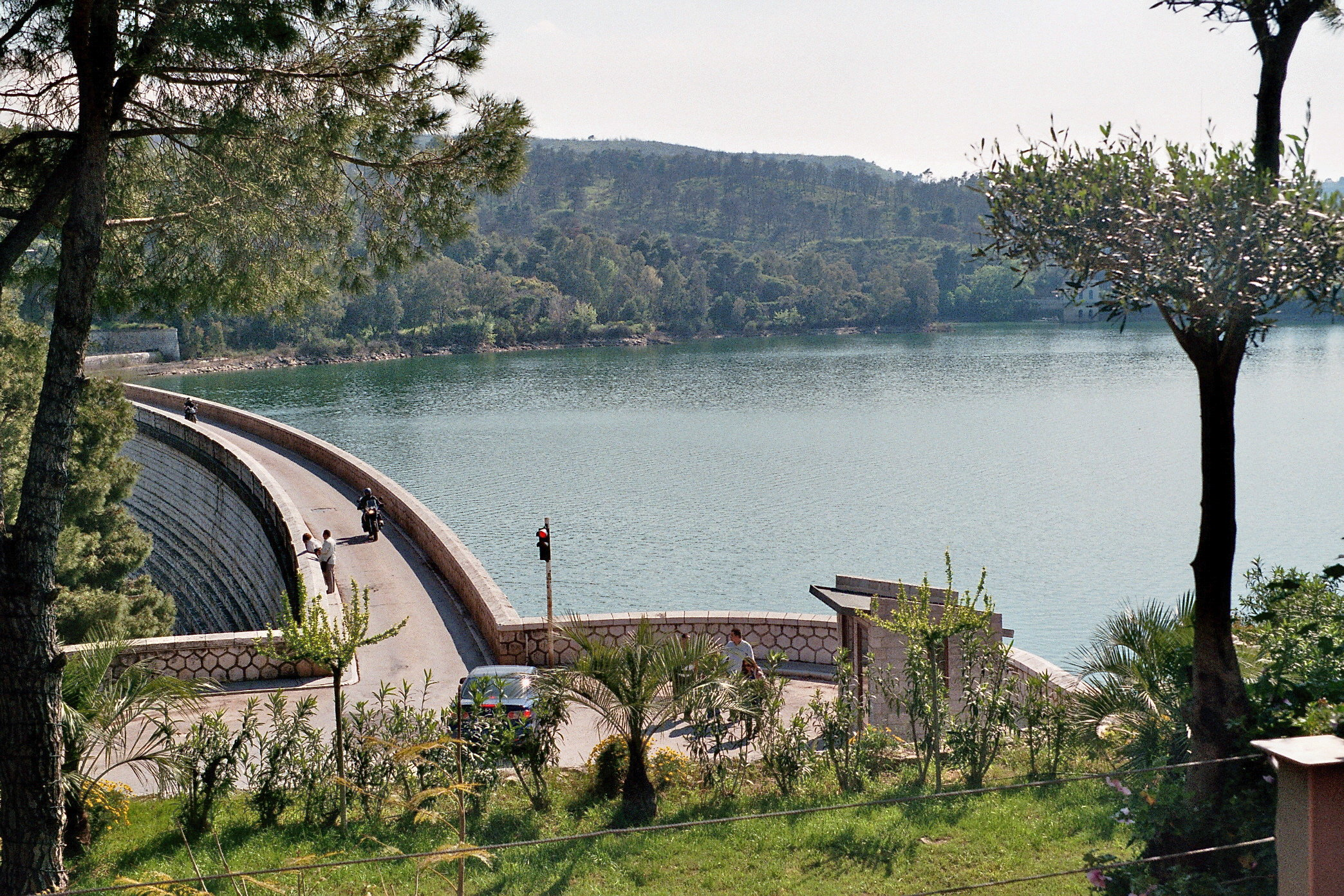
View of the Lake Marathon

The sophist and magnate Herodes Atticus was born in Marathon. In 1926, the American company ULEN began construction on the Marathon Dam in a valley above Marathon, in order to ensure water supply for Athens. It was completed in 1929. About 10 km^{2} of forested land were flooded to form Lake Marathon.

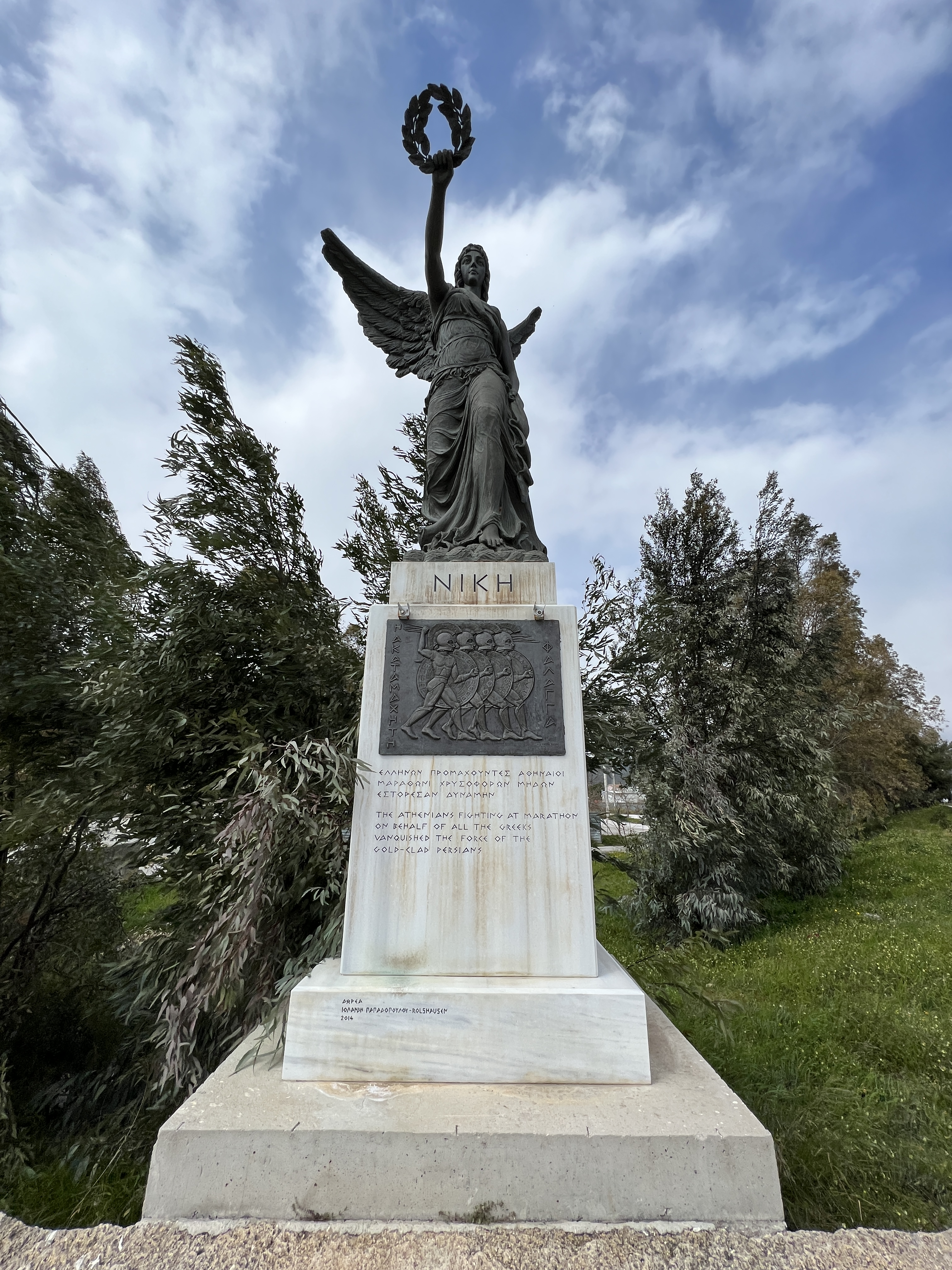
Marathon battle memorial.

The beach of Schinias is located southeast of the town. The beach is popular as a spot for windsurfing and the Olympic Rowing Center used for the 2004 Summer Olympics is also located there.

At the 1896 and 2004 Summer Olympics, Marathon was the starting point of the marathon races (for both women and men in 2004). Marathon is also the starting point for the annual Athens Classic Marathon.

The area is susceptible to flash flooding, because of forest fires having denuded parts of the eastern slopes of Mount Pentelicus especially in 2006.

== Municipality ==
The municipality of Marathon was formed at the 2011 local government reform by the merger of the following 4 former municipalities, that became municipal units:

- Grammatiko
- Marathon
- Nea Makri
- Varnavas

The municipality has an area of 222.747 km^{2} and the municipal unit 97.062 km^{2}.

== Population ==
Year	Town	Municipal unit	Municipality
1981	4,841	-	-
1991	5,453	12,979	-
2001	4,399	8,882	-
2011	7,170	12,849	33,423
2021	5,260	10,063	31,331

The other settlements in the municipal unit are Agios Panteleimonas, Kato Souli, Vranas, Avra, Vothon, Ano Souli, and Schinias.

== Points of interest ==
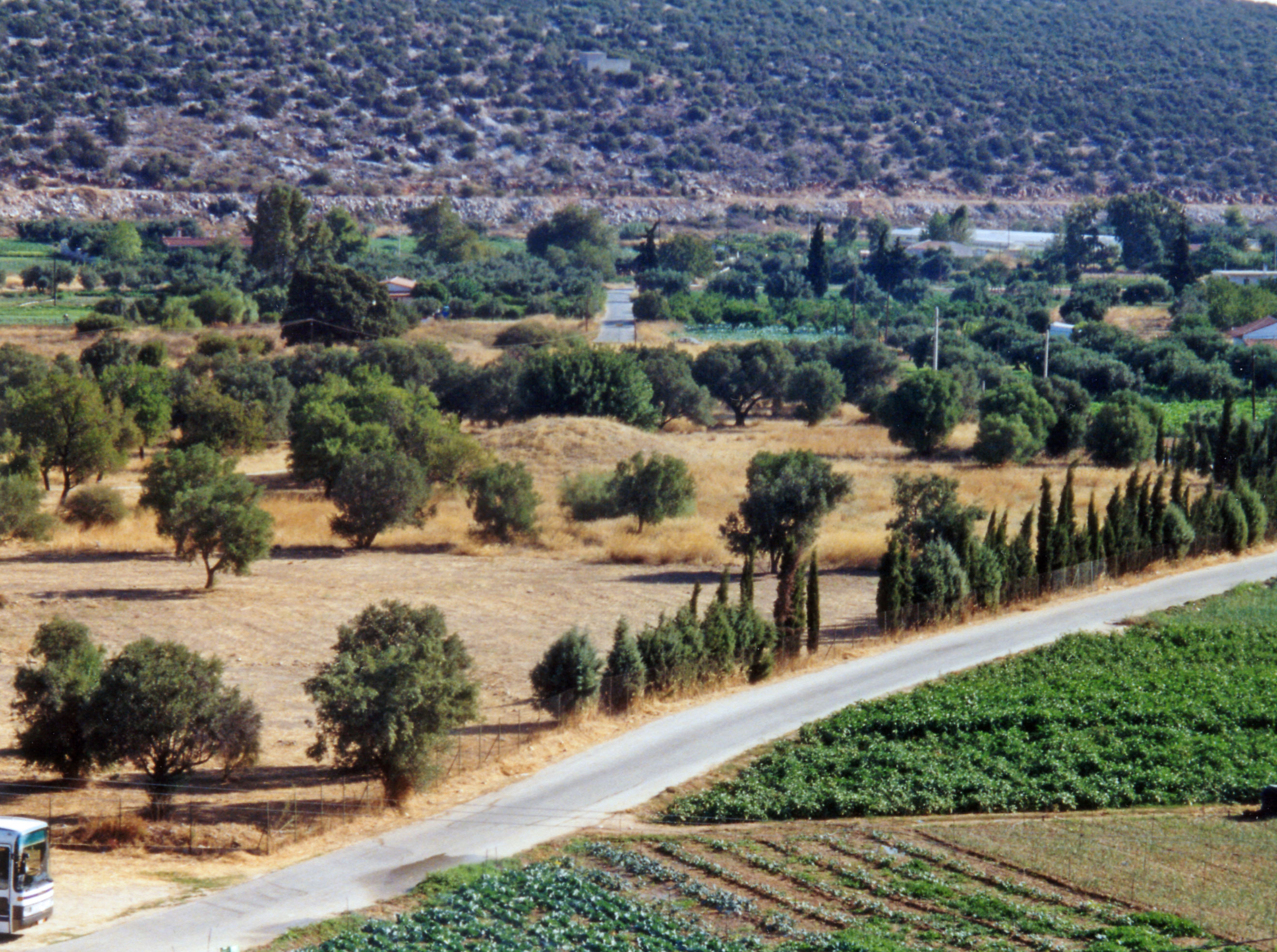
The Soros, a burial mound (Marathon tumuli) to the fallen of the Battle of Marathon

- The Soros, a tumulus (Greek Τύμβος, tymbos, tomb), or burial mound, erected to the 192 Athenian fallen at the Battle of Marathon, is a feature of the coastal plain, now marked by a marble memorial stele and surrounded by a small park.
- Kato Souli Naval Transmission Facility with its 250-metre (820 ft) tall radio mast, the tallest structure in Greece.

== Sister cities ==
- Hopkinton, Massachusetts, United States
- Xiamen, China

== See also ==
- List of municipalities of Attica
- List of settlements in Attica
- Dimitrion Yordanidis, oldest man to have run the marathon, at age 98

== Notes and references ==
Notes

== Bibliography ==
- Δεκουλάκου, Ιφιγένεια (2021). "Ανασκαφή στο ιερό των Αιγυπτίων θεών στον Μαραθώνα". Πρακτικά Αρχαιολογικής Εταιρείας. 176: 19–32.
