= Water supply and sanitation in Greece =

Data
- Access to an improved water source: 100%
- Access to improved sanitation: 100%
- Average urban water and sanitation tariff (US$/m^{3}): 1.34 (in Athens and Thessaloniki, 2007)
- Share of self-financing by utilities: low
- Share of tax-financing: high

Institutions
- Decentralization to municipalities: Decentralized
- Responsibility for policy setting: Ministry of Environment, Ministry of Interior
- No. of urban service providers: 230

Water supply and sanitation in Greece is characterised by diversity. While Athens receives its water from a series of reservoirs, some of which are located 200 km away, some small islands are supplied with water from tankers. Greeks have suffered from repeated droughts, the most recent one occurring in 2007. The EU supported the construction of numerous wastewater treatment plants since the 1990s, in order to achieve EU environmental standards. While the wastewater discharge of the biggest cities is now in compliance with these standards, some smaller towns still lag behind.

Two state utilities, EYDAP in Athens and EYATH in Thessaloniki, are in charge of water supply and sanitation for about half the population. These publicly traded companies post profits despite low tariffs, partly due to investment subsidies from the state. Outside the two largest cities, 230 different municipal utilities are in charge of water supply and sanitation. As part of the so-called Kallikratis plan for local government reform, smaller municipalities and municipal utilities are to be merged into larger units. The Greek financial crisis is making it difficult for Greek utilities to increase tariffs, to enforce payment of arrears and to service their debt.

== Water resources ==
On average, Greece has quite abundant water resources of 58 billion cubic metres per year (1977–2001), of which the country uses only 12 percent. Of that, 87 percent is used by agriculture, 3 percent by industry and only 10% (or 1.2 percent of total water resources) for municipal water supply. However, the average masks substantial variations between years, seasons and regions. Water resources are especially scarce on the Greek islands, some of which are supplied by tanker ships or have turned to seawater desalination. Droughts are a recurrent phenomenon throughout Greece, including a drought in 1993 that was considered the worst in at least 50 years and another drought in 2007.

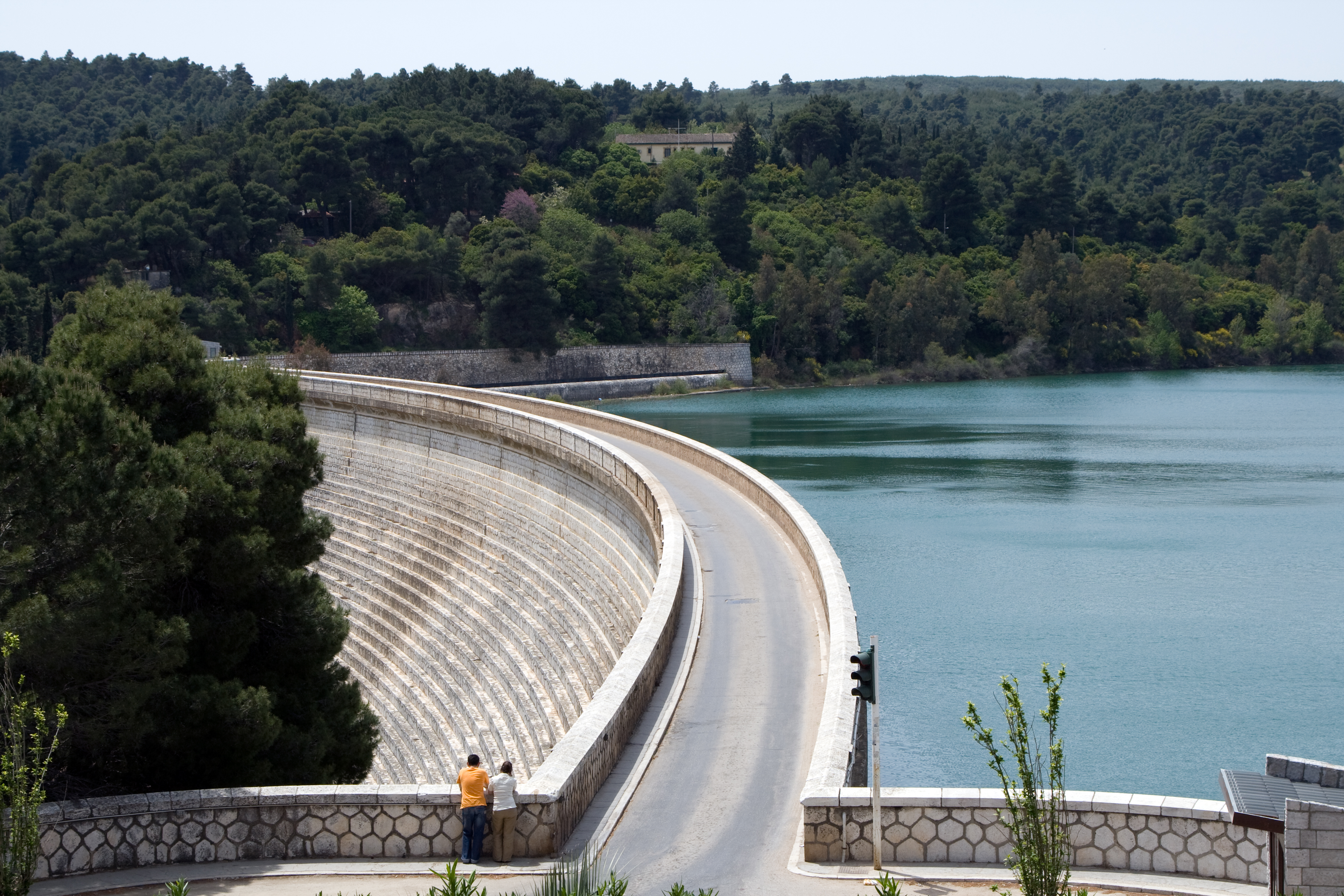
Lake Marathon is one of the drinking water sources for Athens

=== Water sources of Athens ===
Because local water sources are insufficient and to hedge against the risk of drought, the metropolitan area of the capital Athens, where more than a third of the population of Greece lives, is supplied by five different water sources, the most distant one located almost 200 km away. The five sources are:

- Lake Marathon close to the city with an operational capacity of 34 million cubic meters and tapped since 1931 through the Boyati tunnel.
- Lake Yliki, 60 km northwest of the capital with an operational capacity of 590 million cubic metres and tapped since 1959.

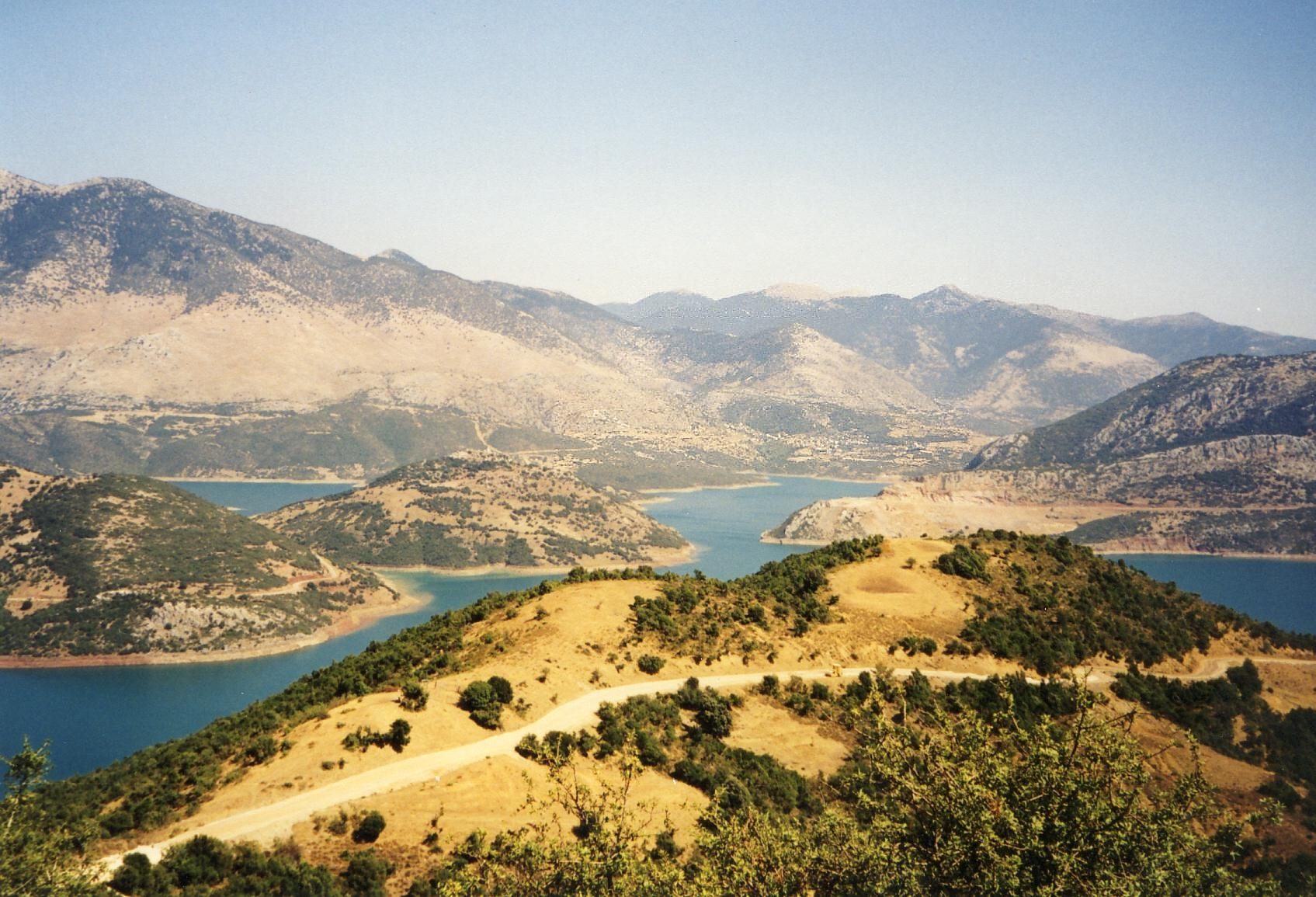
Lake Mornos, created by a dam that was initially built for local water supply, is now partially diverted to supply Athens with drinking water

- The Mornos reservoir 192 km to the west of Athens with an operational capacity of 670 million cubic metres, tapped since 1980 through a system of tunnels and canals.
- the Evinos reservoir with an operational capacity of 113 million cubic metres, completed in 2001, and linked via a tunnel with the Mornos Reservoir.
- 105 boreholes in three wellfields that are used only in emergency situations.

Due to the need to pump large quantities of water over long distances and mountains, the water company of Athens is the second-largest electricity customer in Greece.

Thessaloniki is partly supplied by the Aliakmon River.

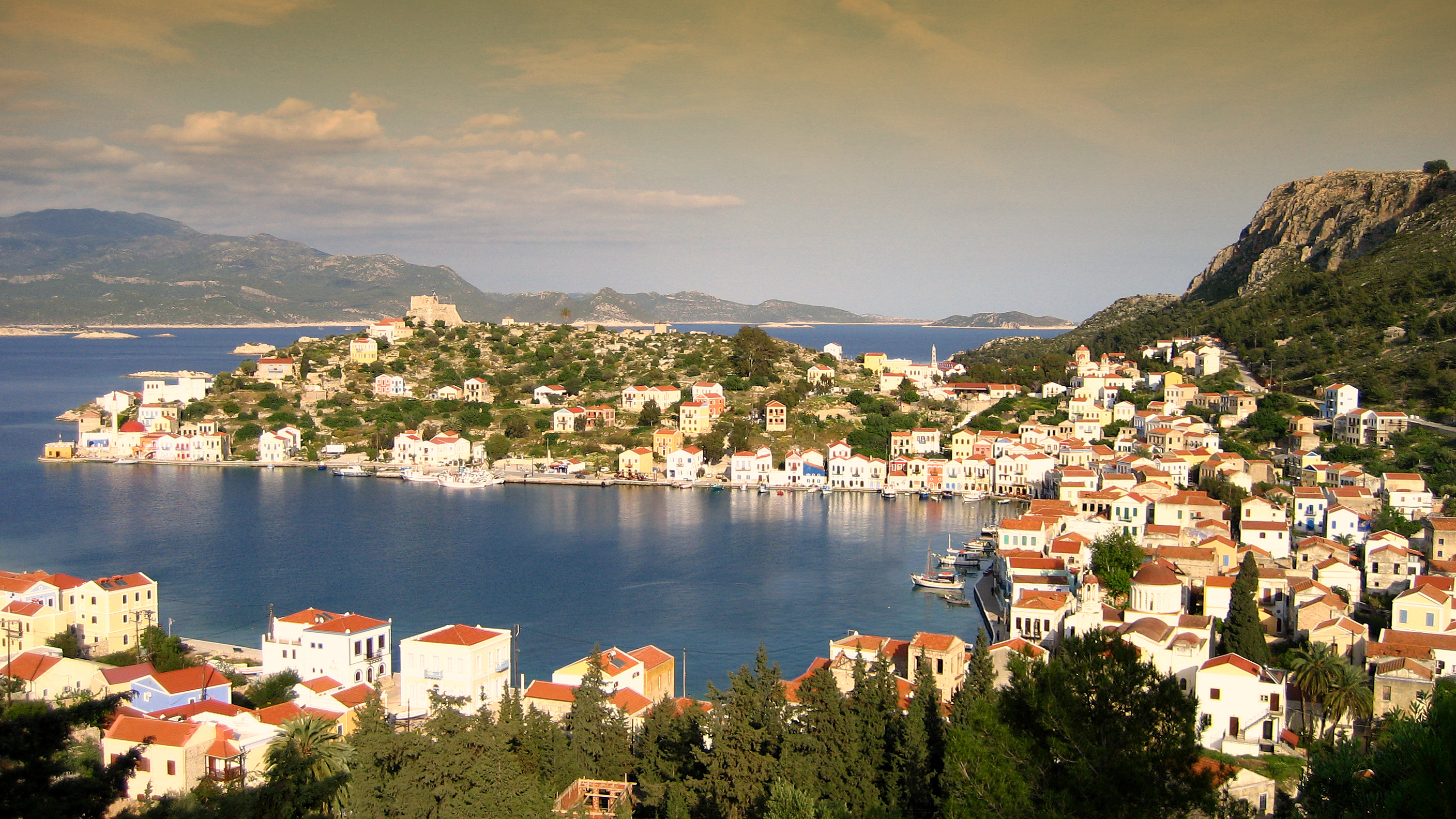
Kastelorizo, an island with 430 inhabitants off the Turkish coast, is supplied with drinking water from tanker boats

The Aegean islands are partly supplied by local groundwater sources. However, some smaller islands have insufficient water resources and have to be supplied via tanker ships at a high cost. For example, the islands Kimolos, Irakleia, Schoinoussa, Symi, Halki, Patmos and Kastelorizo (Megisti) were partly or entirely supplied via tankers as of 2008. Seawater desalination using renewable energy is an emerging option for these islands. A small wind-powered floating desalination plant has been built as a pilot in 2008 and has been anchored off the shore of Irakleia. Historically the inhabitants of Greek islands have also harvested winter rains from rooftops for use during the summer.

== Water reserves ==
Reservoir statistics from EYDAP for Yliki, Mornos, Marathon and Evinos.

Year	1990	1995	2007	2008	2009	2010	2011	2012	2013	2014	2015	2016	2017	2018	2019	2020	2021	2022	2023	2024
Reserves in thousands of cubic meters on 22/07	208.819	486.498	953.509	609.218	780.554	1.029.267	1.125.251	1.127.942	1.264.910	1.156.328	1.309.174	1.183.536	1.062.005	1.145.429	1.308.280	1.153.375	1.170.790	1.221.029	1.018.876	761.450

== Institutional responsibility ==
Policy responsibility. Within the Greek government the Ministry of Environment is in charge of water resources management and the Ministry of Interior is in charge of supervising municipalities which are responsible for providing water and sanitation services. The Ministry of Finance plays an important role in providing subsidies for investment.

Responsibility for service provision. Water and sanitation services in Greece are provided by 230 utilities. The largest utility is the Athens Water and Sewerage Company (EYDAP SA) serving 4 million inhabitants, followed by the Thessaloniki Water and Sewerage Company (EYATH SA) serving about one million inhabitants. Both companies buy raw water from the Greek government that operates the dams and pipelines necessary to store and transfer the raw water. The majority of the shares of EYDAP and EYATH are owned by the government. Private companies and individuals own minorities of 39% in the case of EYDAP and 10% in the case of EYATH (including 5% held by the French company SUEZ). The shares of both companies are listed on the Athens stock exchange. The largest single shareholder of EYDAP currently is the hedge fund of Hank Paulson who bought 9.9% of the shares in May 2014 from Piraeus Bank, which in turn had received the shares when it rescued the collapsed Agricultural Bank of Greece in 2012.

4 million Greeks are served by 230 municipality-owned companies called DEYA. The Hellenic Union of Municipal Enterprises of Water Supply and Sewerage (EDEYA), founded in 1989, represents 155 DEYAs. There are about a 1,000 municipalities in Greece, some of them with fewer than 100 inhabitants.

Consolidation of municipal utilities. The so-called Kallikratis plan approved in May 2010 foresees the redrawing of the boundaries of Greek municipalities and giving them more resources and responsibilities. Under the plan, which is to become effective as early as January 2011, the number of DEYAs is expected to be reduced through mergers from 230 to 142. The number of DEYAs had been only 80 as recently as 1997 when the so-called Kapodistria law increased their number. Many of the municipal utilities created at that time were small and have faced financial difficulties due to low tariffs and excessive hiring. A Greek Ministry of Finance document of 2010 discusses the possibility of creating a holding company to be called Hellenic Waters S.A. for the entire country including EYATH, EYDAP and the DEYAs.

== Impact of the 2010 Greek financial crisis and planned privatisation ==
As a result of the Greek financial crisis, the government wants to privatise EYDAP and EYATH. In June 2010 the Ministry of Finance announced it would reduce its share in the two companies to 51% as part of a broader Hellenic Privatisation Programme. In 2012 the Greek Parliament even voted that the companies should be sold completely. In May 2013 two consortia were prequalified to buy the utilities, one led by the private French water company Suez Environnement and the other by the public Israeli water company Mekorot. A citizens' initiative, called initiative 136, also wants to buy EYATH, but it was not prequalified. Its name derives from €136, which is the estimated value of EYATH's shares that were to be sold originally – 50 million Euro – divided by the number of its water customers. Kostas Marioglou, a union leader and activist of initiative 136, insists that the initiative does not want to preserve the status quo of a "state company where the management is political appointments with no water service experience, running the company poorly before they move on to another party position." Instead it wants to create a transparent, democratic not-for-profit utility. A non-binding referendum on water privatisation

in Thessaloniki will be held y May 9, 2014. Mayors have declared their opposition to privatization, and a local survey showed that 76% of respondents had an unfavourable opinion of privatization. Other coalitions, such as SOSte to nero (Save the water) and Save Greek Water, also oppose the privatisation. Diane D’Arras, Vice-President of Suez, promised annual investments of between 25 and 50 million Euro as well as the creation of 4,000 jobs through privatisation

. These promises were derided by critics as completely unrealistic. In May 2014, the Greek Council of State blocked the transfer of the government's stake to its privatisation fund, the Hellenic Republic Asset Development Fund. Following this decision, a merger of EYDAP with the Thessaloniki Water Supply & Sewage Co. (EYATH) was taken into consideration instead. The new government canceled the privation.67% of EYDAP and 74% of EYATH remains to state.

EYDAP and EYATH have posted profits since they were partly privatised in 2000. In 2009 EYDAP posted an after-tax profit of €6 million and EYATH, though much smaller, posted an after-tax profit of €14 million. In 2012, EYATH posted an after-tax profit of Euro 17.8 million while its income stood at €75 million. The government provided significant investment subsidies. For example, the law that established EYDAP committed the state to subsidise 60% of its capital expenditure either through EU funds or Greek funds. However, subsidies for the DEYAs were reduced by 37% to €23 million in 2010. Many utilities are having difficulties paying back their loans, given the reduction of subsidies and political difficulties concerning tariff increases during an economic crisis. Also, cash revenues may decline due to difficulties in collecting bills from customers whose incomes have been reduced through public sector wage cuts.

Water and wastewater tariffs in Athens and Thessaloniki are increasing-block tariffs under which higher tariffs are charged for higher blocks of consumption. For a consumption of 20 cubic metres per month, the residential combined water and wastewater tariff was €1.20 per cubic metre in Athens and €1.59 per cubic metre in Thessaloniki in 2013. This compares to €1.24 in Rome, €1.57 in Lisbon, €1.62 in Madrid and €3.24 in Paris. Most water tariffs in smaller towns are lower than in Athens and Thessaloniki. According to unions, water tariffs in Thessaloniki have tripled between 2001 and 2014. According to one report, EYATH allegedly "supplies the cheapest water in Europe", while actually its tariffs are higher than e.g. in Rome and among the highest in Greece. The company’s profits are partly due to downsizing from 650 employees in 1998 to only 250 in 2013 due to a hiring freeze, with only 11 plumbers for the whole city. The decline occurred despite a growth in the service area.

By the end of 2023, the shares of EYDAP and EYATH returned to the state.

== Environmental aspects ==
Greece lags behind in the implementation of the European Union’s Urban Wastewater Treatment Directive of 1991, which required all municipal wastewaters to be treated by 2005. The biggest cities are in compliance with the directive. Athens and Thessaloniki, which discharge into sensitive areas, have wastewater treatment plants with nitrogen removal. The wastewater treatment plant of Athens, located on the island of Psyttaleia, was put into service in 1994, followed by a sludge treatment plant that became operational in 2007. Iraklion on the island of Crete and Patras are situated in areas not declared sensitive and provide full secondary treatment followed by nitrogen removal. However, there are issues with insufficient wastewater treatment in some smaller towns.

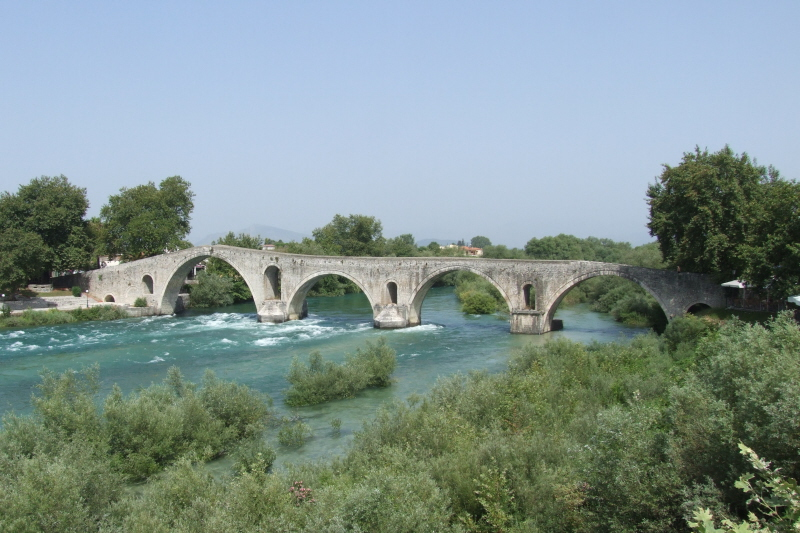
The town of Arta discharges its wastewater in an ecologically sensitive area in the lower reaches of the Arachtos river (shown here with the famous Arta bridge)

In 1999, Greece had identified under the mechanism provided by the Directive 34 lakes, rivers, estuaries and coastal water bodies as sensitive areas due to eutrophication. These include some tributaries of the Aliakmonas river (Grevenitis), the Axios river and Vozvozis river. The European Commission said that 16 additional water bodies should have been identified as sensitive. Among those were the lower part of the Saronic Gulf and the Gulf of Thessaloniki. In 2002 the Greek authorities designated the Thessaloniki Gulf and the lower part of the Saronic Gulf as sensitive. The latter receives Athens' wastewater. According to the Greek authorities 17 agglomerations discharge into these sensitive areas. According to the European Commission, in 2002 (no more recent information from the EC is available) the towns of Elefsina Aspropyrgos, Grevena, Kilkis and Theva discharged their wastewater in sensitive areas without any treatment. Other towns such as Arta and Serres had wastewater treatment plants without phosphorus removal. The latter is required to prevent eutrophication of sensitive water bodies. Furthermore, some existing wastewater treatment plants do not function properly. In 2002 only 2 of the wastewater treatment plants discharging in sensitive areas achieved the treatment efficiency required by the EU Directive. Concerning cities discharging into areas that were not declared as sensitive, as of 2002, Greece achieved a low compliance rate: It provided secondary treatment for less than 50% of the concerned waste water load.
