= Lamedon =

Lamedon may refer to:

- Lamedon, a region of Gondor in J. R. R. Tolkien's works
- Lamedon (mythology), a king of Sicyon in Greek mythology
