= Marathon Dam =

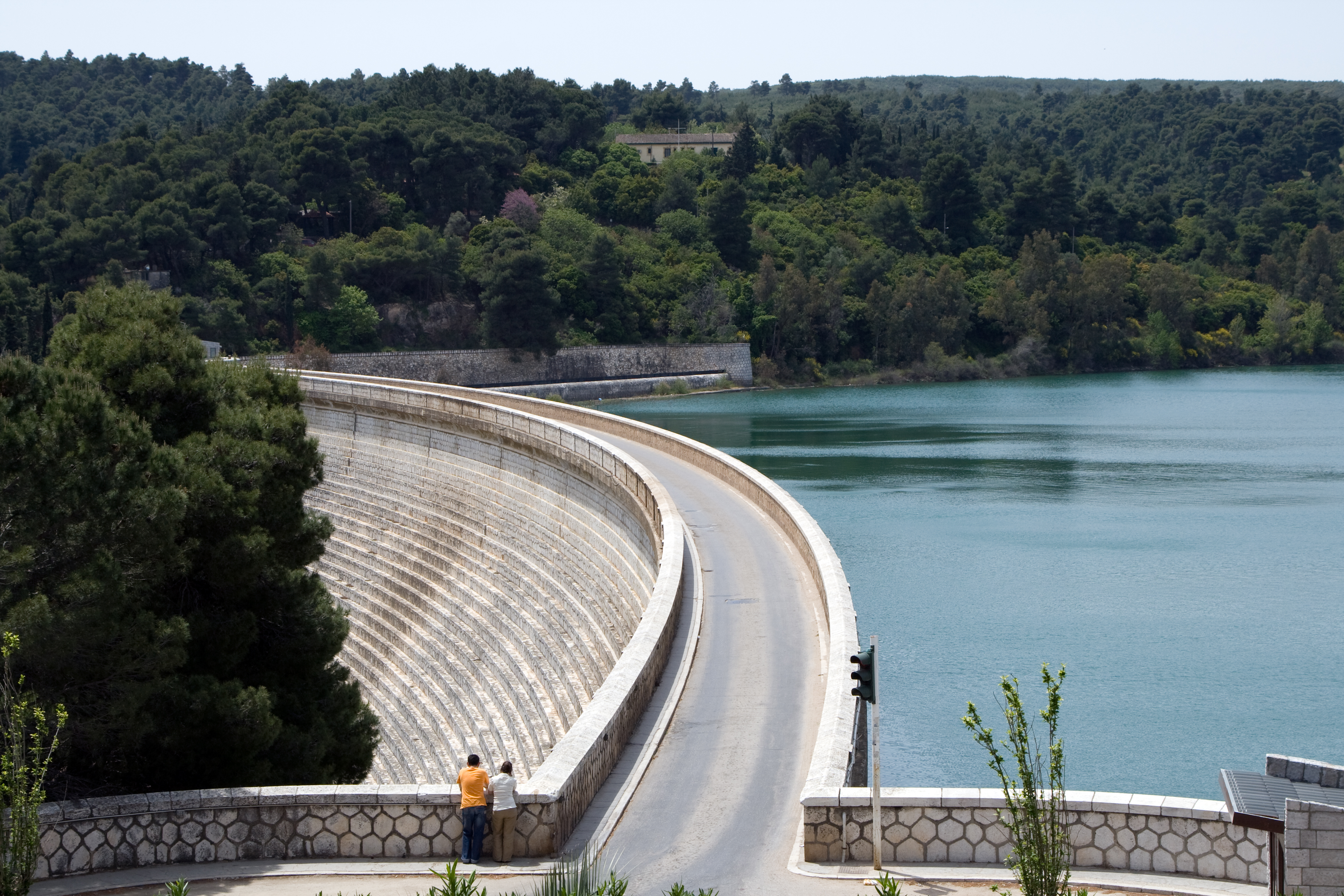
- The dam and reservoir

- Location within Greece
- Country: Greece
- Location: Marathon
- Coordinates: 38°10′01″N 23°54′19″E
- Status: In use
- Construction began: 1926
- Opening date: 1929
- Owner: EYDAP

Dam and spillways
- Type of dam: Gravity
- Impounds: Charadros River
- Height: 54 m (177 ft)
- Length: 285 m (935 ft)
- Width (crest): 4.5 m (15 ft)
- Width (base): 28 m (92 ft)
- Spillway type: Service, uncontrolled chute
- Spillway capacity: 520 m^{3}/s (18,364 cu ft/s)

Reservoir
- Creates: Lake Marathon
- Total capacity: 41,000,000 m^{3} (33,239 acre⋅ft)
- Active capacity: 34,000,000 m^{3} (27,564 acre⋅ft)
- Inactive capacity: 7,000,000 m^{3} (5,675 acre⋅ft)
- Catchment area: 118 km^{2} (46 sq mi)
- Surface area: 2.45 km^{2} (1 sq mi)
- Maximum water depth: 54 m (177 ft)

The Marathon Dam is a gravity dam on the Charadros River, near its junction with the Varnavas Stream, 8 km (5 mi) west of Marathon and 45 km (28 mi) northeast of Athens in Greece. The dam created Lake Marathon for the primary purpose of municipal water supply. Constructed between 1926 and 1929, it was the sole supplier of water to Athens until 1959. The dam is often cited for its role in the modernization of Greece and the first recorded case of seismic activity associated with reservoir inundation. It was also designed to be symbolic of Ancient Greece, particularly Athenians and the Battle of Marathon.

== Background ==
The Marathon Dam was originally proposed, designed, funded and tendered in 1918, but was declared illegal by Prime Minister Dimitrios Gounaris, who succeeded Eleftherios Venizelos in late 1920, because there had been no public bidding for the project. With a strong influx of Greek refugees from Asia Minor following the defeat at the Greco-Turkish War of 1919–1922 (the "Asia Minor Disaster") and the 1923 Treaty of Lausanne, which led to the population exchange between Greece and Turkey, Greek officials were searching for a means to supply Athens with more water. An estimated 1.3 million refugees were returning and the population of Athens would end up doubling between 1920 and 1928. At the time, Greece underwent a period of political turmoil that saw the fall of the monarchy and the establishment of a Second Hellenic Republic, as well as several military coups and counter-coups. Near the end of this period, all major water supply projects for Athens were reevaluated and a five-volume report was published. The report described the Marathon Dam as "the optimal solution" and the "last recourse" for Athens.

The dam was approved in 1923 and was to be implemented immediately. After a restricted public bidding, Ulen & Co. from New York City was selected to construct the project. On December 22, 1924, Ulen signed a contract with the Greek government and the Bank of Athens to construct the dam. This included the dam, reservoir, a 21.5 km (13 mi) conveyance pipe and a water treatment plant. The Greek parliament also approved the project and legislated the creation of the Hellenic Water Company (EEY) to oversee construction and manage water for Athens, amongst other Greek cities. The project's cost exceeded that of the National Bank of Greece and was funded with a $10 million loan to be repaid to Ulen, who had considerably more financial backing to complete the average-sized project. Under EEY, a Ulen-controlled consortium with the Bank of Athens and the Greek Government was formed.

== Construction ==
The foundation stone for the dam was laid in October 1926 by Prime Minister Alexandros Zaimis; Venizelos was also present at the ceremony. With 450 workers, construction continued on the dam and water network for three years and in 1929, the reservoir began to fill. Work on the dam and water network was complete in May 1931. A year after inauguration, the 13.4 km (8 mi) Boyati Tunnel was transferring 500 litres (130 US gal) per second of water treated at the Galatsi Water Treatment Plant to Athens. The dam would serve as the primary water supply for Athens until 1959, when water was pumped from Yliki lake.

== Seismicity ==
During and after the filling of the Marathon Dam's reservoir, there was seismic activity, with all the epicenters being within 15 km (9 mi) of the reservoir. The first earthquakes were felt in 1931, with two 5M_{W}+ earthquakes occurring in 1938. All but two of the earthquakes were believed to have occurred during rapid rises in the reservoir level. This seismic activity is the earliest known example of earthquakes being caused by reservoir filling.

== Design ==
The dam is a 54 m (177 ft) tall, 285 m (935 ft) long gravity dam with a crest width of 4.5 m (15 ft) and base width of 28 m (92 ft). The dam's spillway is located near its southern abutment and is an uncontrolled chute-type with a 520 m^{3}/s (18,364 cu ft/s) discharge capacity. It is at an elevation of 223 m (732 ft) above sea level while the dam crest is at 227 m (745 ft). The dam creates a reservoir with a maximum capacity of 41,000,000 m^{3} (33,239 acre⋅ft) of which 34,000,000 m^{3} (27,564 acre⋅ft) is usable. The reservoir has a maximum depth of 54 m (177 ft) and surface area of 2.45 km^{2} (1 sq mi) The dam is located at the head of a 118 km^{2} (46 sq mi) drainage area with an average annual run-off of 14,400,000 m^{3} (11,674 acre⋅ft), of which 12,000,000 m^{3} (9,729 acre⋅ft) is captured. Average rainfall in the basin is 580 mm (23 in).

=== Symbolism ===
The Marathon Dam was seen as a major symbol of modernization in Greece. The dam's location near Marathon signified a connection to Greece's past with the Athenians' victory at the Battle of Marathon, while its modern structure, the largest project in the Balkans at the time, signified a connection to the future and victory over nature. A replica of the Athenian Treasury temple at Delphi constructed at the base of the dam further illustrates the connection. A plaque on the temple reads:

"To commemorate their victory at the battle of Marathon, the Athenians erected a treasury at Delphi. This building is a replica and commemorates a victory at Marathon in wrestling from nature its life giving water for the citizens of Athens."

The dam's face and visible structure were also covered in the same Pentelikon marble that was used to construct the Parthenon.
