= Marathon (mythology) =

Greek mythological figures

In Greek mythology, Marathon (Ancient Greek: Μαραθῶν, romanized: Marathṓn), also Marathos or Marathus (Μάραθος), may refer to the same or four distinct characters who gave his name to Marathon, a town in Attica.

- Marathus, the 14th king of Sicyon who reigned for 20 or 30 years. His predecessor was Marathonius and himself was succeeded by Echyreus, otherwise unknown. During his reign, Zeus slept with Io, the daughter of Iasus, and Cecrops founded Athenai in Euboea which was also called Diada or as Euboeans called it as Orchomenon. Marathus may be similar with the below Marathon.
- Marathon, a king of Corinth after succeeding his father King Epopeus of Sicyon and Corinth. His father's only known wife is Antiope, the Theban daughter of Regent-king Nycteus, but she is not clearly stated to be Marathon's mother. He was the brother of Oenope, and father of Corinthus and Sicyon. Marathon escaped from the lawless violence of his father and migrated to the sea coast of Attica (in Marathon). On his father's death, Marathon came back to Peloponnesus and divided his kingdom among his sons and returned to Attica where he had previously settled.
- Marathus, an Arcadian hero who accompanied the Dioscuri in their expedition into Attica to rescue Helen who had been abducted by Theseus. Marathus died when, in accordance with some oracle, he voluntarily devoted himself to be sacrificed in front of the line of battle. After him the township of Marathon was called.
- Marathos, son of Apollo and one of the possible eponyms of Marathon.
