= Mouseio, Athens =

Mouseio Μουσείο
- Neighborhood
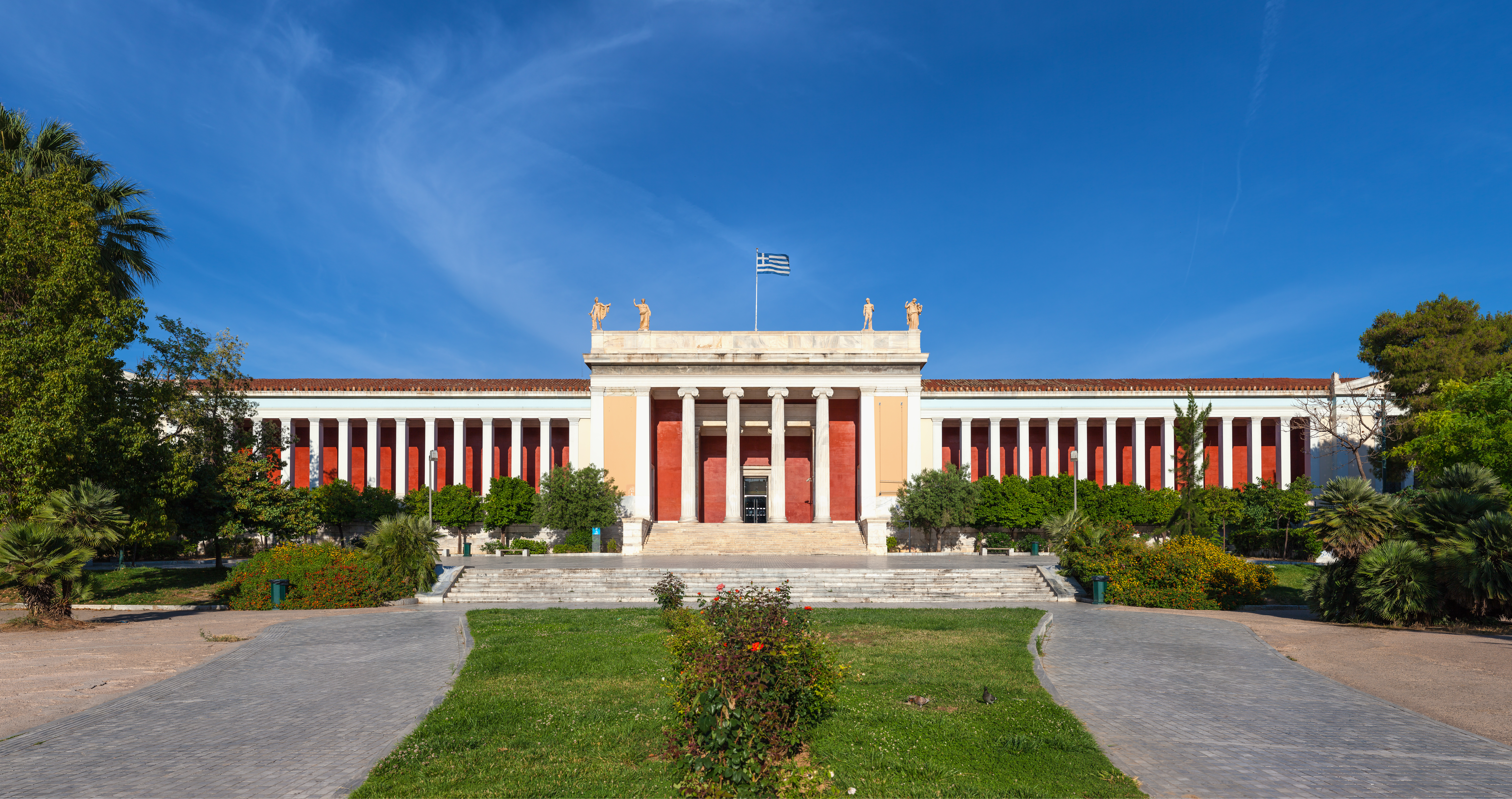
- The National Archaeological Museum
- Interactive map of Mouseio
- Coordinates: 37°59′21″N 23°43′56″E
- Country: Greece
- Region: Attica
- City: Athens
- Website: www.cityofathens.gr

Mouseio (Greek: Μουσείο) is an official municipal neighbourhood of Athens, located north of the centre of Athens, which takes its name from the iconic National Archaeological Museum.

Its northern bond is Alexandras avenue, Egyptou square and Ioulianou street. Its western bond is 3rd September Street from Iouliaou street till Omonia square. Most of the neighbourhood sits within the Daktylios, the low emission zone of Athens.

== Administrative ==
The municipal neighbourhood Mouseio belongs to the Mouseio-Exarcheia-Neapoli municipal district, together with Exarcheia, Lofos Strefi, and Neapoli 1. This district is one of the districts composing the 1st municipal community of Athens.

== Culture ==
Maria Callas is tightly associated with this neighbourhood, where she spent her teen years, and signed, in June 1940, her first professional contract with the newly established Greek National Opera, as a resident of Patision Street 61.

South of the National Archaeological Museum sits the historical building of the National Technical University of Athens where the Athens Polytechnic uprising took place.

== Ongoing renovations ==
The restoration of Maria Callas' childhood house to host the Academy of Lyrical Arts.

The upgrade of the National Archaeological Museum, Athens concerns the complete neighbourhood.
