= Theseus Saving Hippodamia =

Sculpture in Athens, Greece

- Greek: Θησεύς σώζων την Ιπποδάμειαν
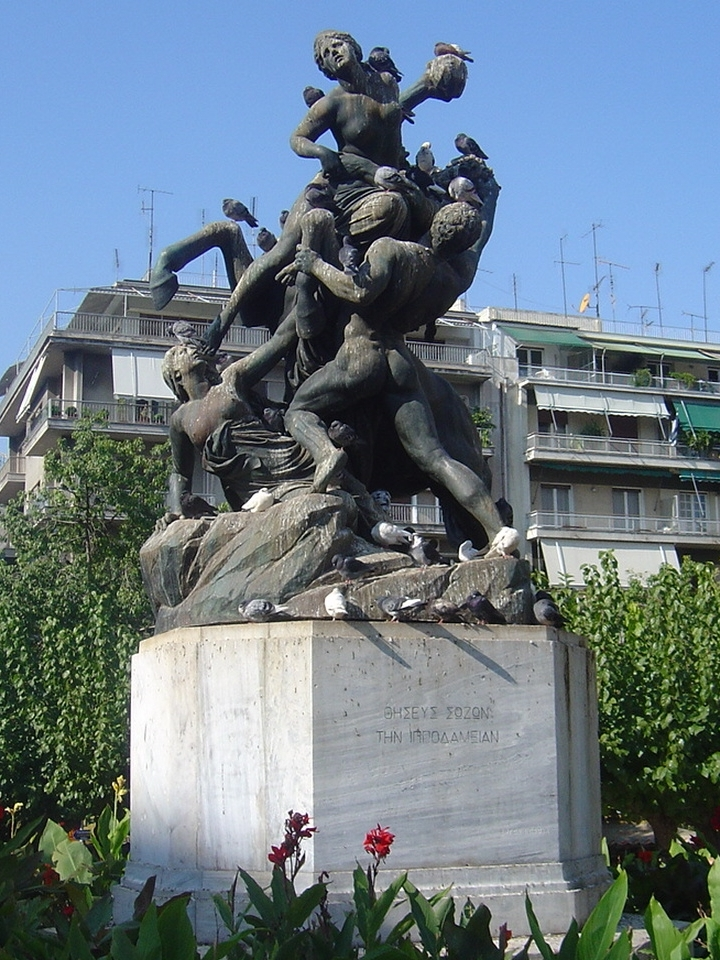
- Artist: Johannes Pfuhl
- Location: Viktoria Square, Athens

The sculptural group of Theseus Saving Hippodamia by Johannes Pfuhl is located in Viktoria Square in Athens. It is considered one of the most important public sculptures of the 20th century in the city.

== History ==
The group was created in Berlin in 1906 by the German sculptor Johannes Pfuhl (1846–1914) and was cast in 1908 from galvanized bronze in a German factory. The entire sculptural structure stands on an octagonal marble base, with the engraved inscription "ΘΗΣΕΥΣ ΣΩΖΩΝ ΤΗΝ ΙΠΠΟΔΑΜΕΙΑΝ. ΕΡΓΟΝ Ι. ΠΦΟΥΛ" ('Theseus Saving Hippodamia. Work of J. Pfuhl'). The sculpture represents the hero Theseus who, according to Greek myth, saved the beautiful Hippodamia, the wife of King Pirithous of the Lapiths, from the drunken centaur Eurytion in the Centauromachy.

This bronze sculpture was donated to the Municipality of Athens in 1927 and was originally placed at Syntagma Square, from where it was moved in 1937 to its present location in Viktoria Square.

== See also ==
- Nike of Marathon
