= Corax (mythology) =

Men in Greek mythology

In Greek mythology, Corax (Ancient Greek: Κόραξ, romanized: Kórax, lit. 'raven') or Corex can refer to either:

- Corax, the 16th king of Sicyon who reigned for 30 years. He was the elder son and heir of King Coronus, descendant of the city's founder Aegialeus. He was brother of Lamedon. Corax received the throne from his predecessor Echyreus, in whose reign Danaus became the king of Argos. After Corax died childless, Lamedon was his rightful successor, but Lamedon was usurped by Epopeus who came from Thessaly and seized the kingdom from him. In the latter's reign, the conflict between Sicyon and Thebes ensued.
- Corax, the son of Arethusa and an unknown man from Ithaca. While hunting a hare, he fell off a rock and died. The rock took his name thereafter, while his mother killed herself next to a spring out of grief.

Regnal titles
Preceded by Coronus or Echyreus	King of Sicyon; 30 years	Succeeded by Epopeus
