= Nike of Marathon =

Bronze statue of Nike

Coordinates: 38°08′58″N 23°57′50″E

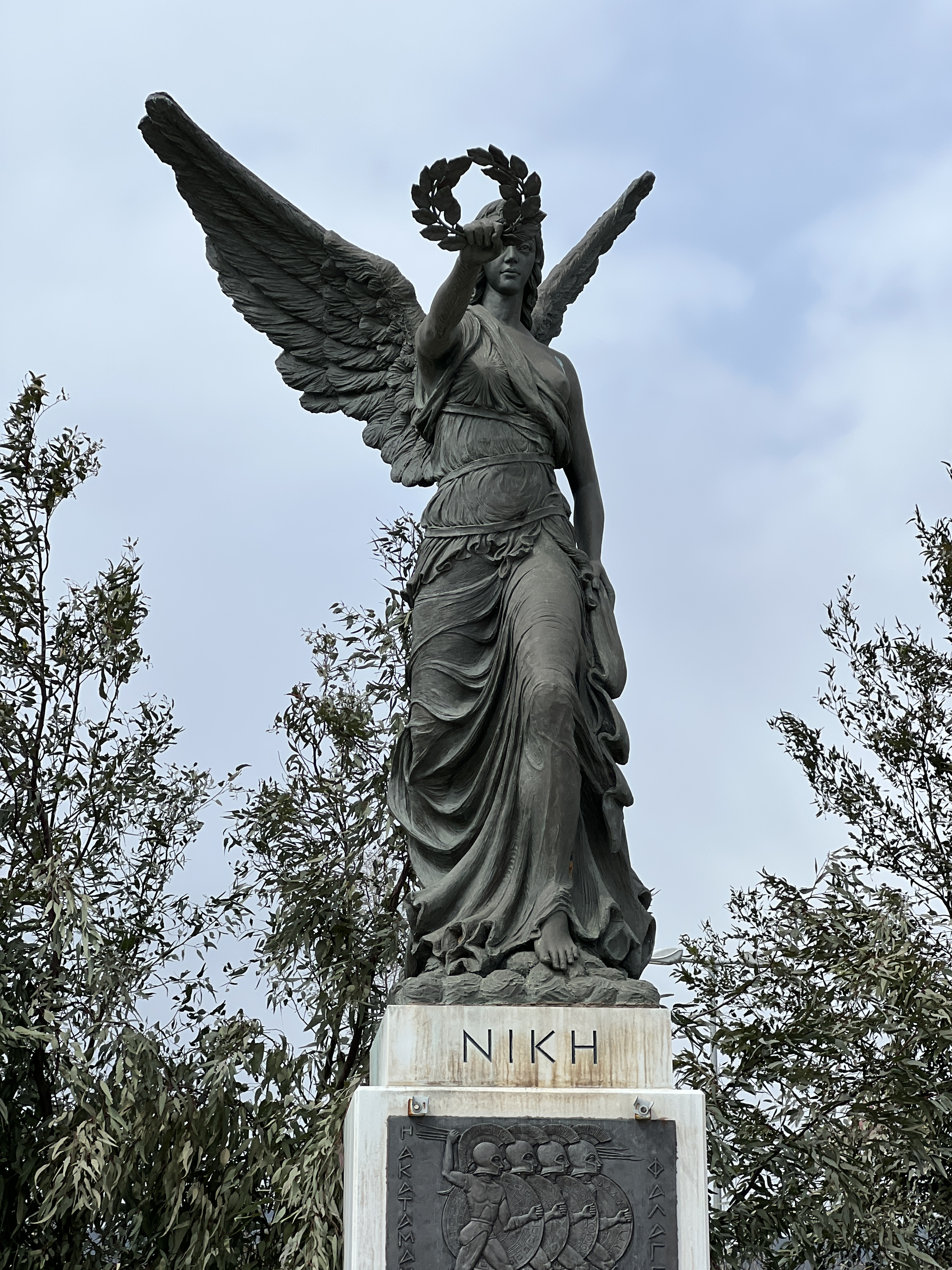
Nike of Marathon

The statue of Nike at Marathon (Greek: Νίκη του Μαραθώνα) is a larger than lifesize bronze statue of Nike, the Greek goddess of victory, placed right outside of Marathon, Greece, as a monument to the fallen of the Battle of Marathon, a battle that took place in 490 BC against the Persian invaders.

== Description ==
The large bronze statue of Nike was sculpted by Greek sculptor Nikos Georgiou, and commissioned and paid by Iolande Papadopoulou-Rolshausen, a member of the Marathon archaeological society. It was placed in town of Marathon on November 6th 2014. Nike is depicted as a winged woman holding a victory wreath, while her long dress forms deep folds all over her body.

== See also ==
- Nike (Kougioumtzis)
- Theseus saving Hippodamia
