= Johannes Pfuhl =

German sculptor

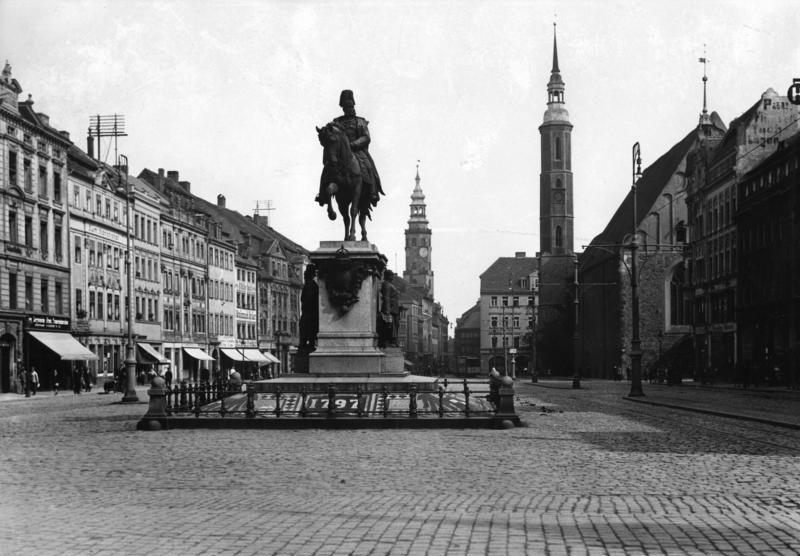
Equestrian statue of Kaiser Wilhelm I with Otto von Bismarck and Helmuth von Moltke, in Görlitz (1893; destroyed)

Johannes Pfuhl (20 February 1846 – 5 May 1914) was a German sculptor.

== Biography ==
He was born in Löwenberg, in the Prussian Province of Silesia. He studied in the Berlin Academy of Fine Arts under Hermann Schievelbein. He became his master's assistant and completed his plans for the bronze memorial once in the Dönhoffplatz (now the Marion-Gräfin-Dönhoff-Platz), Berlin. Soon after Schievelbein's death Pfuhl settled in Charlottenburg. He made a few portrait busts, but his more typical products were colossal groups or reliefs.

== Works ==
- frieze in rilievo, commemorating the Franco-Prussian War, for the military school of Groß Lichterfelde, Berlin (1876; destroyed)
- statue of Count Stolberg, in Landeshut, Silesia
- "Perseus Liberating Andromeda," a fountain decoration in Posen (1884, go to Johannes Pfuhl to see the photo), and also in the Goethe Theatre (Theater des Westens?) in Charlottenburg (1896, removed)
- "Theseus saving Hippodamia", Viktoria Square in Athens (1906)
- equestrian statue of William I with Otto von Bismarck and Helmuth von Moltke, in Görlitz (1893; destroyed)
- Heinrich Laube monument at Sprottau (1895)
- Goethe monument (1902)
- standing group of William I and Frederick III (1902; destroyed)
- William I, for the Reichstag building (1905)
