= Lake Marathon =

Reservoir storing water for Athens, Greece

Lake Marathon Τ. Λίμνη Μαραθώνος
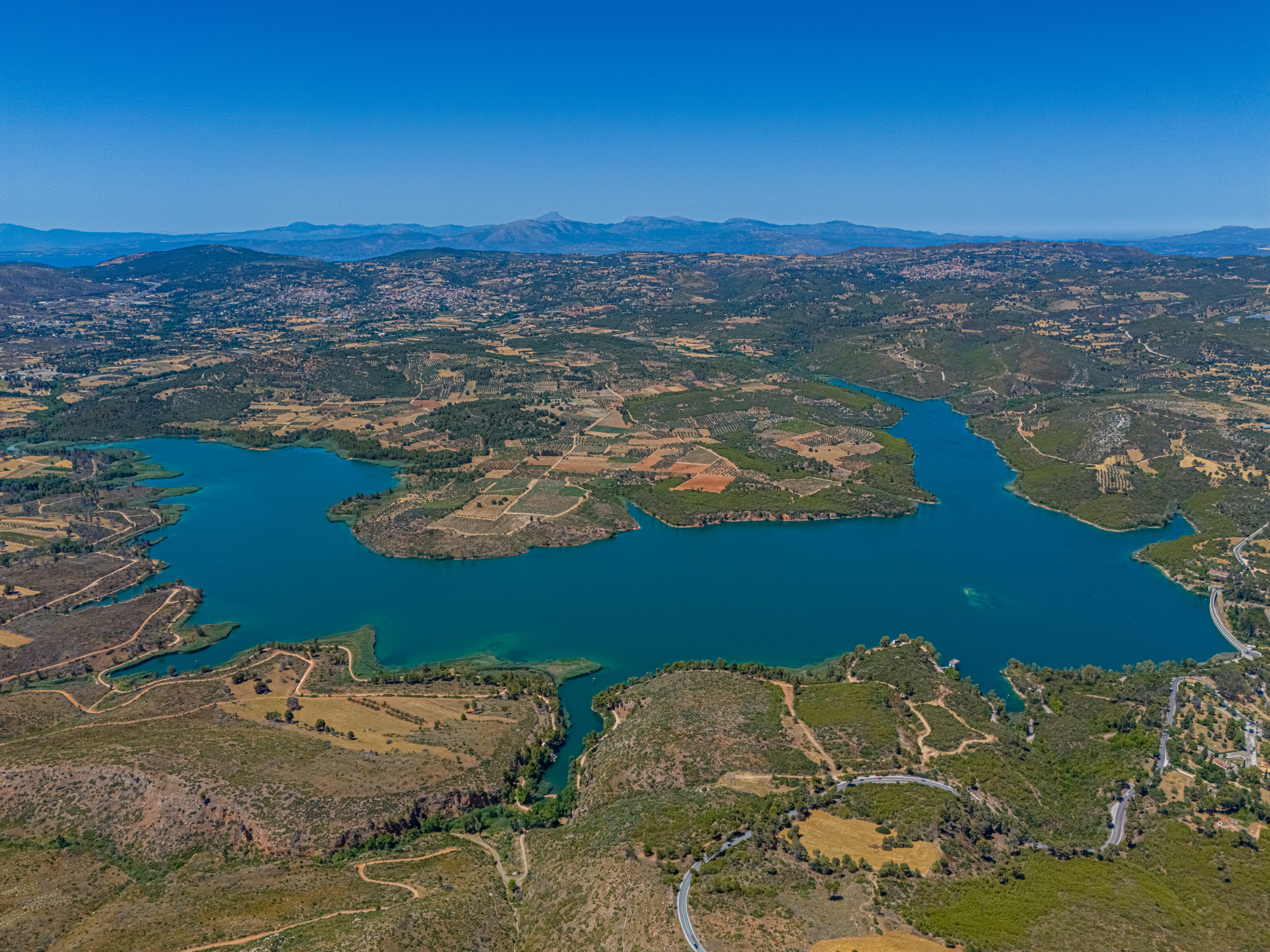
- Marathon Reservoir

- Location within Greece
- Coordinates: 38°10′07″N 23°54′00″E
- Type: Artificial Lake
- Primary inflows: Charadros, Varnavas
- Catchment area: 118 km^{2} (46 sq mi)
- Basin countries: Greece
- Surface area: 2.45 km^{2} (0.95 sq mi)
- Max. depth: 54 m (177 ft)
- Water volume: 34×10^{6} m^{3} (28,000 acre⋅ft)
- Surface elevation: 227 m (745 ft)

Lake Marathon or the Marathon Reservoir (Greek: Λίμνη Μαραθώνος [Limni Marathónos] or Λίμνη Μαραθώνα [Limni Marathóna]) is a man-made water supply reservoir formed from the construction of Marathon Dam at the junction of Charadros and Varnavas Torrents near the town of Marathon, Greece. It was the primary water supply for Athens from 1931, when it became operational, until 1959. In 1959 water from Lake Yliki became available, and water from Mornos Reservoir became available in 1981.

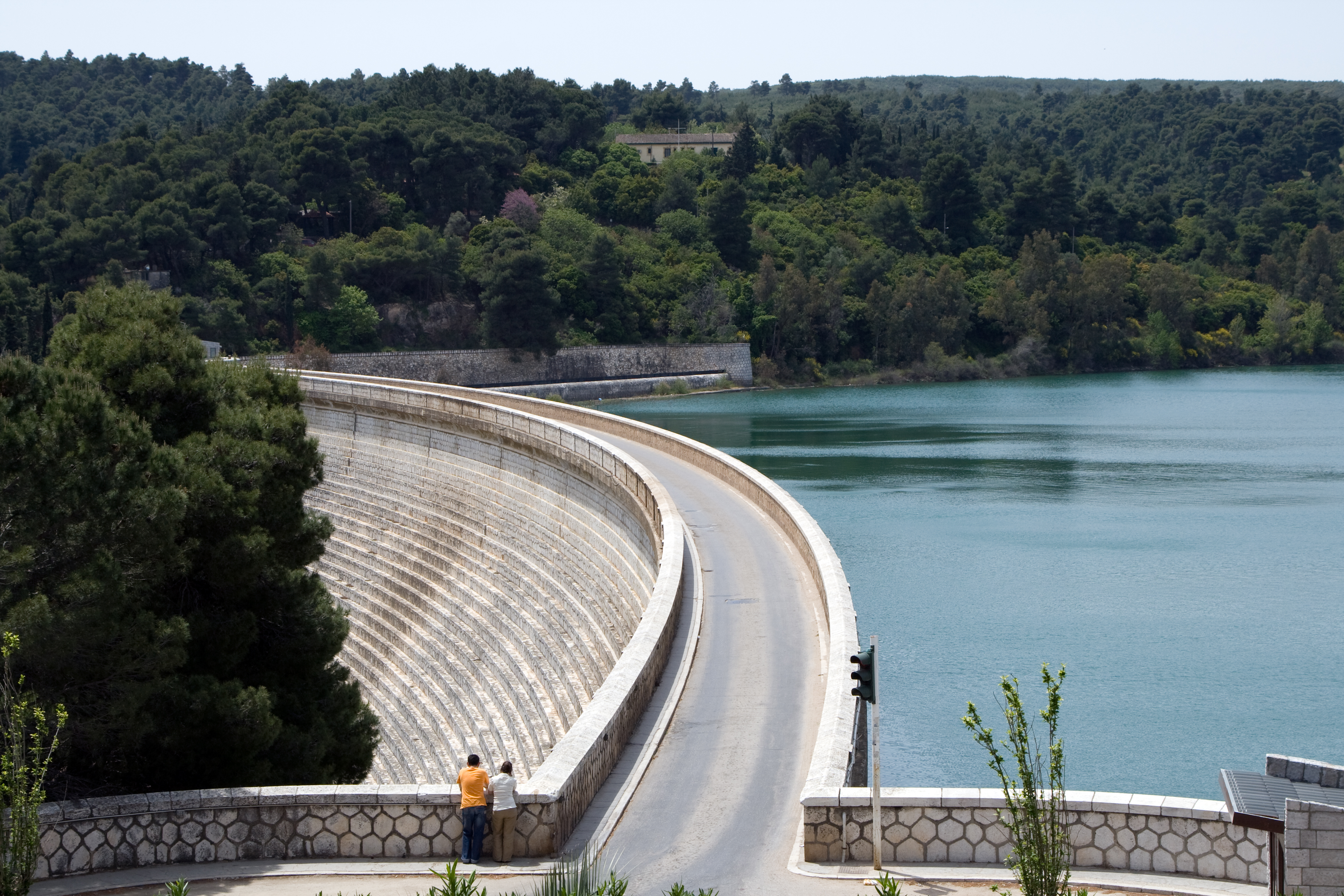
Lake Marathon Dam

The area of the lake at the height of the spillway of the dam is 2.45 square kilometres, the maximum depth is 54 m, the lake concentrates water from a drainage basin of 118 square kilometres with an average runoff of 14,400,000 m³ per year in an average rainfall of 580 mm per year, the average inbound volume is 12,000,000 m³ per year and the maximum reservoir capacity is 41,000,000 m³ (effective volume 34,000,000 m³).

The dam has a maximum height (from foundation to crest) of 54 m, a maximum width of 28 m at the base and 4.5 m at the crest. Its length is 285 m. The crest is 227 m above sea level, the toe is 173 m above sea level, and the spillway is 223 m above sea level. The spillway disgorges 520 m³/s. The dam is constructed from concrete and is a gravity dam. It is unique worldwide because its external cladding of white pentelikon marble is the same marble used in construction of the Parthenon and the other buildings in the Acropolis. The dam was constructed by the American firm ULEN (which had, in a BOT type contract, the ownership of the water supply company of Athens until 1974). It was constructed to meet the increased water demand caused by the rapid population increase in the Athens area following the huge influx of refugees from Asia Minor during and after the end of Greco-Turkish War (1919–1922). The construction lasted from 1926 to 1929.

== See also ==
- List of lakes in Greece
