= Pheno =

Person in Greek mythology

In Greek mythology, Pheno (Ancient Greek: Φηνὼ) was the Athenian woman and daughter of Clytius. She married Lamedon, king of Sicyon, and bore him a daughter Zeuxippe.
