= Oenope =

In Greek mythology, Oenope or Oinope (Ancient Greek: Οινόπη) was a Sicyonian princess as daughter of King Epopeus and possibly Antiope of Thebes, thus sister to King Marathon of Corinth. She was the mother of King Megareus of Onchestus by the sea god Poseidon. Otherwise, the parentage of Megarus can be attributed to Onchestus, Apollo, Aegeus or Hippomenes.
