= Corinthus =

Ancient Greek real or mythical people

In Greek mythology, Corinthus (/kəˈrɪnθəs/; Ancient Greek: Κόρινθος Korinthos) may refer to the following personages:

- Corinthus, the eponymous founder of the city of Corinth and the adjacent land. According to the local Corinthian tradition, he was a son of Zeus, but this tradition was not followed elsewhere.
- Corinthus, son of Marathon, who ruled over Corinth. When he died without issue, the Corinthians bestowed the kingdom upon Medea, because her father Aeetes had once ruled over the land before his departure to Colchis.
- Corinthus, father of Sylaea, mother of Sinis with Polypemon.
- Corinthus, an Elean prince as son of King Pelops of Pisa and possibly Hippodamia, daughter of King Oenomaus.
