= Dimitrion Yordanidis =

Greek runner

Dimitrion Yordanidis (c. 1878 – c. 1980) was a Greek runner, who, according to Guinness World Records, completed the 26-mile marathon course from Marathon, Greece to Athens on 10 October 1976 in 7 hours 33 minutes, aged 98. Guinness World Records considered him to be the oldest man to complete a marathon until Fauja Singh completed the Toronto Marathon on 16 October 2011 at the age of 100 (and a half). World Masters Athletics, the world governing body responsible for records in the sport, did not accept Singh's proof of age and did not give him any of record. WMA has no listed record for men's marathon age 90+, though they do list a W90 record for Mavis Lindgren age 90 from 1997.

Yordanidis is unknown to the Association of Road Racing Statisticians, which maintains a list of single age records. It currently lists Fauja Singh and Jenny Wood-Allen as the oldest male and female marathon record holders in the 90+ age group. Fauja Singh finished the Toronto Marathon 2003 in 5 hours and 40 minutes, aged 92; Jenny Wood-Allen walked the London Marathon 2002 course in 11 hours and 34 minutes, aged 90.

Yordanidis is also absent from the records list maintained by the World Masters Athletics organisation, which ratifies and registers five-year age-group records. The WMA list for marathon finishers contains no entries for the 95+ age group and above.

Veteran marathon runner Werner Sonntag took part in the 1976 Marathon-Athens race and reported in his weekly column that the German sports magazine, Spiridon, claimed at the time that Yordanidis cut the course by using a car; however, no proof of this assertion was ever provided to the WMA authorities.
