= Apotropaei =

Apotropaei (Greek: Ἀποτρόπαιοι) were in ancient Greece certain divinities, by whose assistance the Greeks believed that they were able to avert any threatening danger or calamity—that is, figures of apotropaic magic. Their statues stood at Sicyon near the tomb of Epopeus. The gods Apollo, Zeus and Athena were worshiped with the cult epithet Apotropaios (Averter) in various Greek cities. The ancient Romans likewise worshipped gods of this kind, and called them dii averrunci, derived from averruncare.
