= Tricorythus =

Coordinates: 38°09′53″N 24°00′00″E

Tricorythus or Trikorythos (Ancient Greek: Τρικόρυθος) or Tricorynthus or Trikorynthos (Τρικόρυνθος) or Tricorinthus or Trikorinthos (Τρικόρινθος) was a deme of ancient Athens, in the plain of Marathon in northeast Attica. It along with Oenoe, Marathon, and Probalinthus, formed the Attic Tetrapolis, one of the twelve districts into which Attica was divided before the time of Theseus. The plain near Tricorythus was where the right of the Persian army were forced into the marsh during the Battle of Marathon.

The site of Tricorythus is located northeast of Kato Souli.
