= Lamedon (mythology) =

18th king of Sicyon

In Greek mythology, Lamedon ( /ˈlæmɪˌdɒn, ˈlæmɪdən/; Ancient Greek: Λαμέδων) also known as Laomedon, was the 18th king of Sicyon who reigned for 40 years.

== Family ==
Lamedon was the younger son of King Coronus the Sicyonian, and brother to King Corex. He was married Pheno, daughter of the Athenian Clytius, and had by her a daughter Zeuxippe.

== Mythology ==
After his older brother died without issue, Lamedon was to succeed him, but the kingdom was seized by Epopeus. However, Epopeus died of a wound he had received in the battle against Nycteus, who attacked Sicyon in order to retrieve and punish his daughter Antiope, who had fled and married Epopeus. Lamedon then took over as his heir; according to Pausanias, after Nycteus' death in the fight his brother Lycus returned to continue the war, but Lamedon chose to avoid any more bloodshed, and instead gave up Antiope to him.

Later, when Lamedon was engaged in a military conflict against Archander and Architeles (sons of Achaeus and the husbands of the Danaïdes Scaea and Automate), he had Sicyon of Attica for an ally. In reward for Sicyon's assistance, Lamedon gave him Zeuxippe to wife and pronounced him his successor.

Regnal titles
Preceded by Epopeus	King of Sicyon; 40 years	Succeeded by Sicyon
