= Epopeus of Sicyon =

In Greek mythology, Epopeus (/ɪˈpoʊpiːəs/; Ancient Greek: Ἐπωπεύς) was the 17th king of Sicyon, with an archaic bird-name that linked him to epops (ἔποψ), the hoopoe, the "watcher". A fragment of Callimachus' Aitia ("Origins") appears to ask, "Why, at Sicyon, is it the hoopoe, and not the usual splendid ravens, that is the bird of good omen?"

== Etymology ==
Epopeus name means 'all-seer', from epopao, 'to look out', 'observe', in turn from epi, 'over' and ops, 'eye'.

== Family ==
Epopeus was the son of Poseidon either by princess Canace, daughter of King Aeolus of Thessaly, or by the Pleiad Alcyone. Yet, in some accounts, his father was Aloeus, son of Helius.

Epopeus married the Theban princess Antiope. He had two children, Oenope and Marathon, although Antiope is not confirmed to be their mother.

== Mythology ==
=== Reign ===
Epopeus migrating from his homeland in Thessaly seized the kingdom of Sicyon from Lamedon, the supposed successor of the latter's elder brother King Corax. He reigned in his new home for a period of 35 years.

Epopeus was the most memorable king at Sicyon and features in Euripides' Antiope. He founded a sanctuary of Athena on the Sicyonian acropolis where he performed victory rites, celebrating his defeat of Theban intruders. Athena caused olive oil to flow before the shrine.

At Titane in Sicyonia, Pausanias saw an altar, in front of it a tumulus raised to the hero Epopeus, and, near to the barrow-tomb, the "Gods of Aversion"—the apotropai—"before whom are performed the ceremonies which the Hellenes observe for the averting of evils".

=== War with Thebes ===
In the etiological myth that accounted for the origin of rituals propitiating the daimon of Epopeus, it was told that Zeus impregnated the daughter of Nycteus, Antiope, who fled in shame to Epopeus, king of Sicyon, abandoning her children, Amphion and Zethus. They were exposed on Mount Cithaeron, but, in a familiar mytheme, were found and brought up by a shepherd. Unable to retrieve his daughter, Nycteus made war with Epopeus but was wounded by the latter and carried back to Thebes. Before Nycteus died, he sent his brother Lycus to take Antiope. This time Epopeus was killed in battle by Lycus, or he died of a neglected wound that he received when his army defeated Nycteus. After Epopeus's death, Lamedon became the king of Sicyon and gave up Antiope to her uncle Lycus who then gave her as a slave to his own wife, Dirce.

Regnal titles
Preceded by Corax	King of Sicyon; 35 years	Succeeded by Lamedon
