= Orchomenus (Thessaly) =

Orchomenus or Orchomenos (Ancient Greek: Ὀρχομενός) was a town of Phthiotis in ancient Thessaly. In 302 BCE, Cassander planned to transfer to town's population to Phthiotic Thebes but this was prevented by Demetrius Poliorcetes.

Its site is unlocated.
