= Tetrapolis (Attica) =

Group of four ancient demes of Attica

Tetrapolis (Greek: Τετράπολις) comprised one of the twelve districts into which Attica was divided before the time of Theseus. The district was on a plain in the northeastern part of Attica and contained four cities: Marathon (Μαραθών), Probalinthus (Προβάλινθος), Tricorythus (Τρικόρυθος), and Oenoe (Οἰνόη). Stephanus of Byzantium claimed Huttēnia (Ὑττηνία) was its name among the Pelasgoi. The name persisted as a reference to the cities, which shared a religious calendar. Following the reforms of Cleisthenes in 508, the cities (demes) of Marathon, Oenoe, and Tricorythus were organised into a single trittys along with the city of Rhamnous, whilst Probalinthus belonged to another trittyes; nonetheless, the former was often still referred to as the Tetrapolis despite not including Probalinthus.
