= Daktylios =

Road space rationing area in Athens, Greece

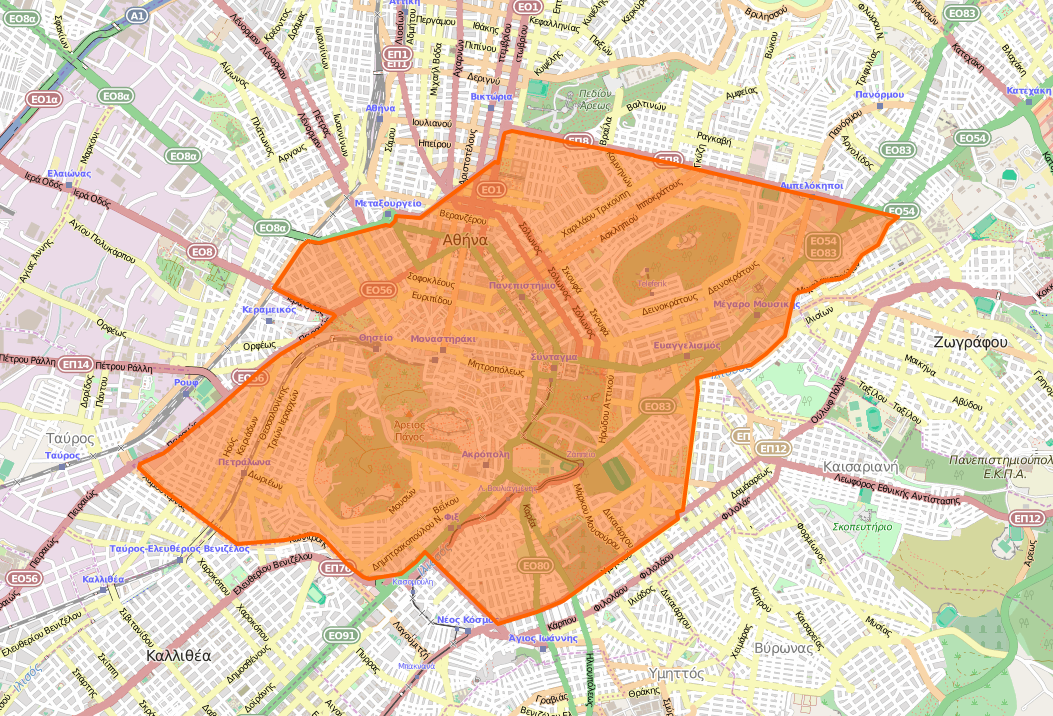
Athens inner Daktylios limits

Athens Daktylios symbol

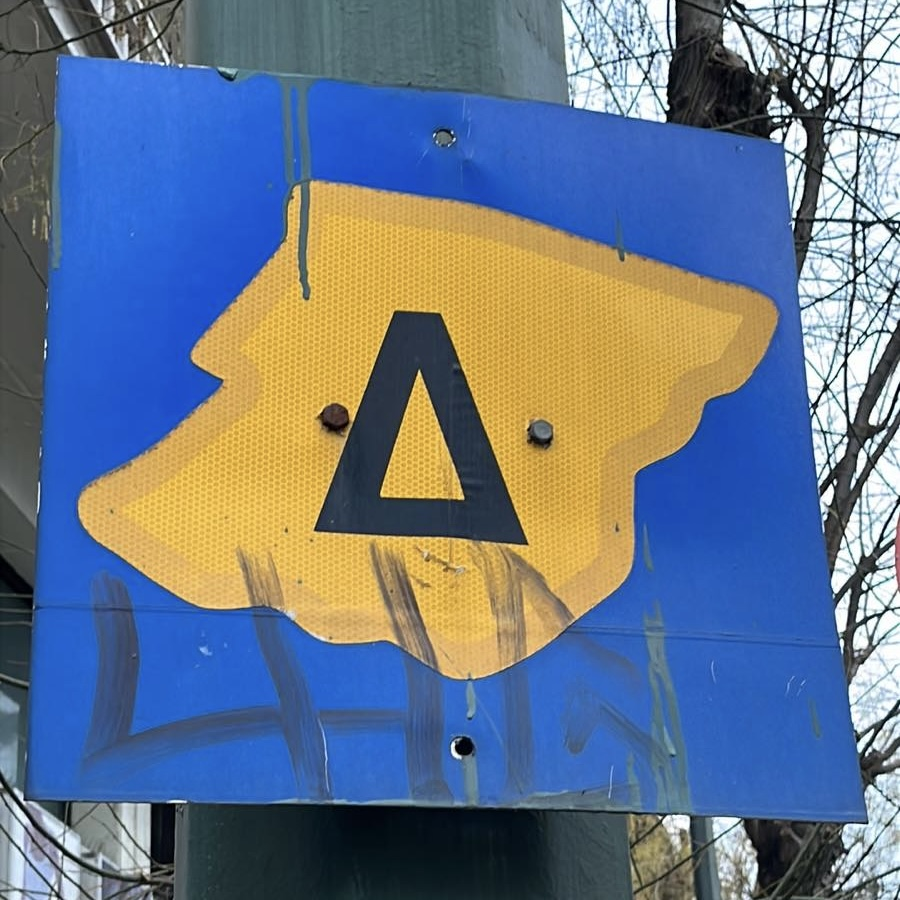

Daktylios (Greek: Δακτύλιος, lit. 'ring') is the name given to the road space rationing or alternate-day travel developed for Athens during the late 1970s. Unlike congestion pricing systems, it does not operate on the basis of drivers paying fees for entering the city centre. Instead, it depends on the parity of the date and of the vehicle's registration plate, the vehicle type as well as the time of the week/month. There are two Daktylios areas.

== Inner Daktylios ==
Vehicles are allowed into the Inner Daktylios, which covers a small area in the city center, depending primarily on the parity of the date and of the vehicle's registration plate, the vehicle type as well as the time of the week/month. On odd dates, only vehicles with an odd plate number are allowed to proceed into the Daktylios. On even dates, only cars with even plate numbers are allowed. Lorries and other heavy vehicles are always banned, while residents within the Inner Daktylios area use a special pass that grants them access on all times of the year. The restrictions are removed on weekends, bank holidays and during certain months (usually between July and October), with the dates changing every year depending on the expected levels of traffic.

== Outer Daktylios ==
The Outer Daktylios covers a much wider area and is implemented only during times of extreme congestion or high pollution. It affects only heavy vehicles and certain roads within the area covered are not subjected to the Outer Daktylios' restrictions.

== Green Daktylios ==
The Green Daktylios is a scheme that allows electric cars, hybrid cars and all vehicles produced after 2011 that produce less than 140g/km of CO_{2} access to the Inner Daktylios anytime.

== Criticism ==
The Daktylios scheme has been criticised for being ineffective, with the primary reason being that many people own two cars, one with odd and one with even plate numbers, granting them daily access and the other one being that it is occasionally violated. However, there are no plans to phase it out or replace it with a congestion pricing system.
