= Orchomenus (Euboea) =

Orchomenus or Orchomenos (Ancient Greek: Ὀρχομενός) was a town of ancient Euboea.
