= Charadros =

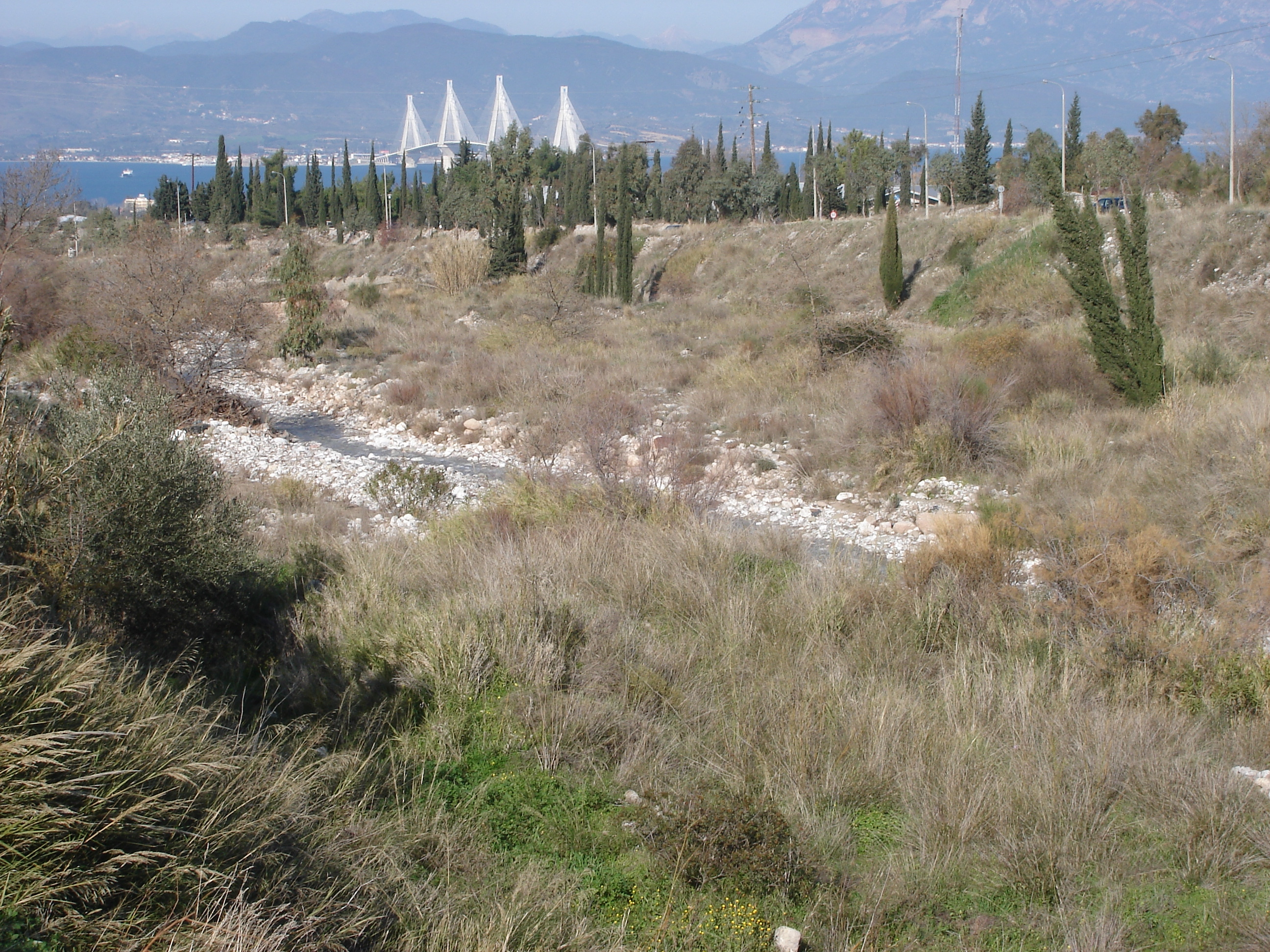
- Charadros near Kastritsi
- Native name: Χάραδρος (Greek)

Location
- Country: Greece

Physical characteristics
- Source
  - location: Panachaiko
- Mouth
  - location: Gulf of Patras in Patras
  - coordinates: 38°17′25″N 21°45′48″E
- Length: 7.6 km (4.7 mi)

The Charadros (Greek: Χάραδρος) is a river in the northern part of Achaea, Greece. Its course lies entirely within the municipality of Patras. It is 7.6 km (4.7 mi) long.

== Geography ==
The source of the river Charadros is in the Panachaiko mountains, northwest of its highest point. It flows in a northwestern direction through a narrow, forested valley. In its lower course, it passes the villages Skioessa and Kato Kastritsi. In the north bank is the University of Patras. The river is crossed by Greek National Road 8 and the A5 Patras bypass, as well as the Athens–Patras railway. It empties into the Gulf of Patras in the northern Patras neighbourhood Kastellokampos.

== History ==
In Antiquity, the herdsmen believed that female animals that drank water from the river bore mostly male offspring; for this reason, they only watered their cows here. Alternative, historical names are Belbitsianiko and Bozaitiko.
