= Epithets of Zeus =

Titles of the Greek god Zeus

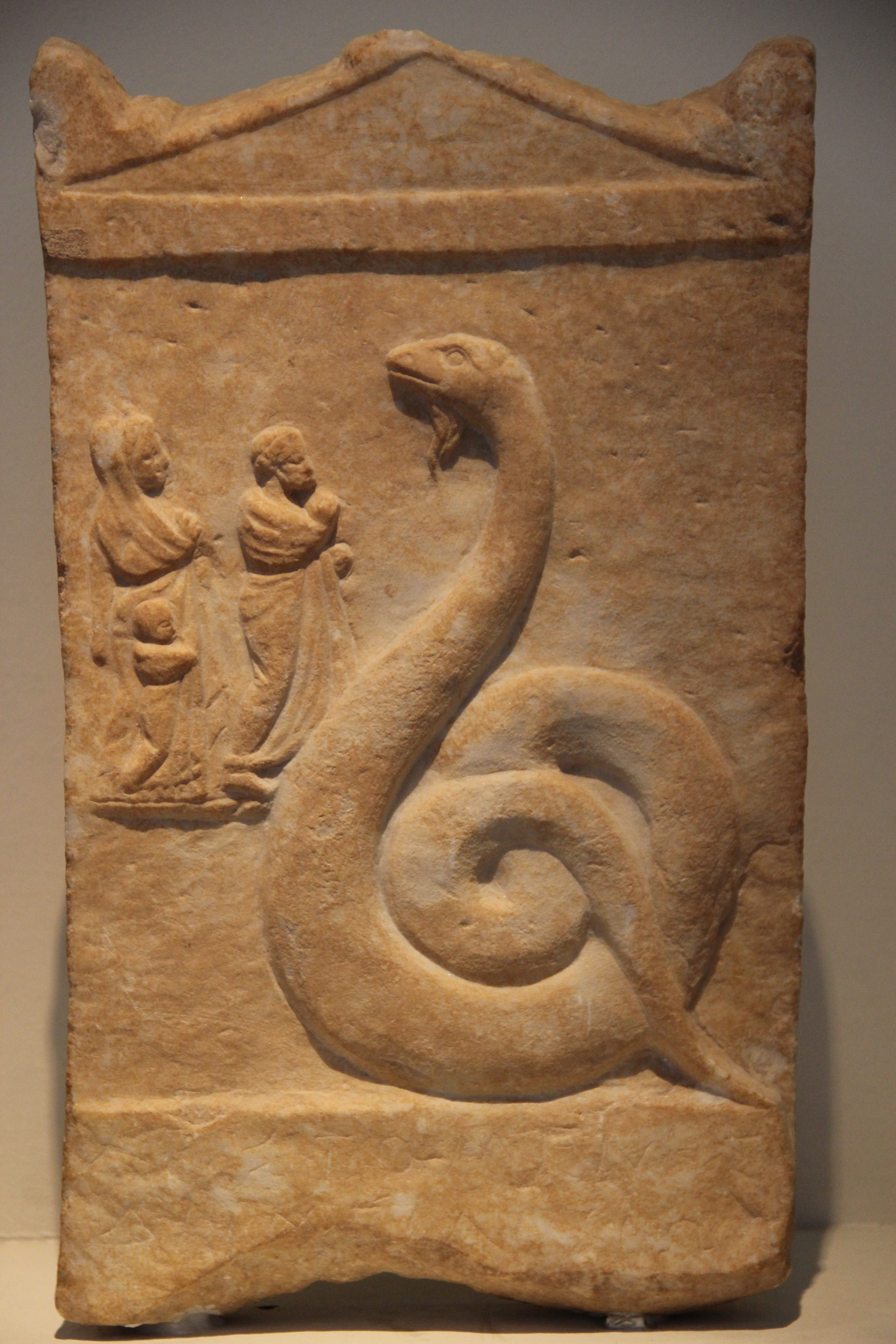
Votive relief depicting Zeus Meilichios as a serpent, c. 350–300 BC

The numerous epithets of Zeus (titles which are applied to his name) indicate the diversity of the god's functions and roles. Over one thousand of Zeus's epithets survive in literary and epigraphic sources.

A number of these epithets (called epicleses) were used in cult, while others appear only in literature. Some epicleses were Panhellenic, while others were of local significance and derived from particular locations of worship. Others still contained references to aspects of ritual activity.

== Local variation ==
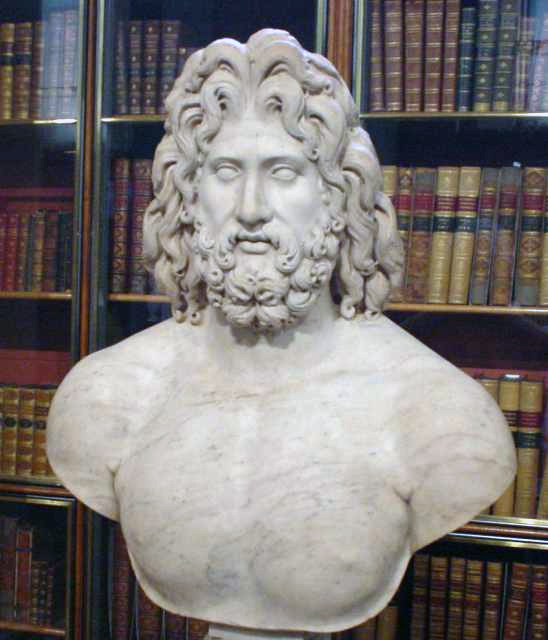
Roman marble colossal head of Zeus, 2nd century AD (British Museum)

Popular conceptions of Zeus differed widely from place to place. Local varieties of Zeus often have little in common with each other except the name. They exercised different areas of authority and were worshiped in different ways; for example, some local cults conceived of Zeus as a chthonic earth-god rather than a god of the sky. These local divinities were gradually consolidated, via conquest and religious syncretism, with the Homeric conception of Zeus. Local or idiosyncratic versions of Zeus were given epithets — surnames or titles which distinguish different conceptions of the god.

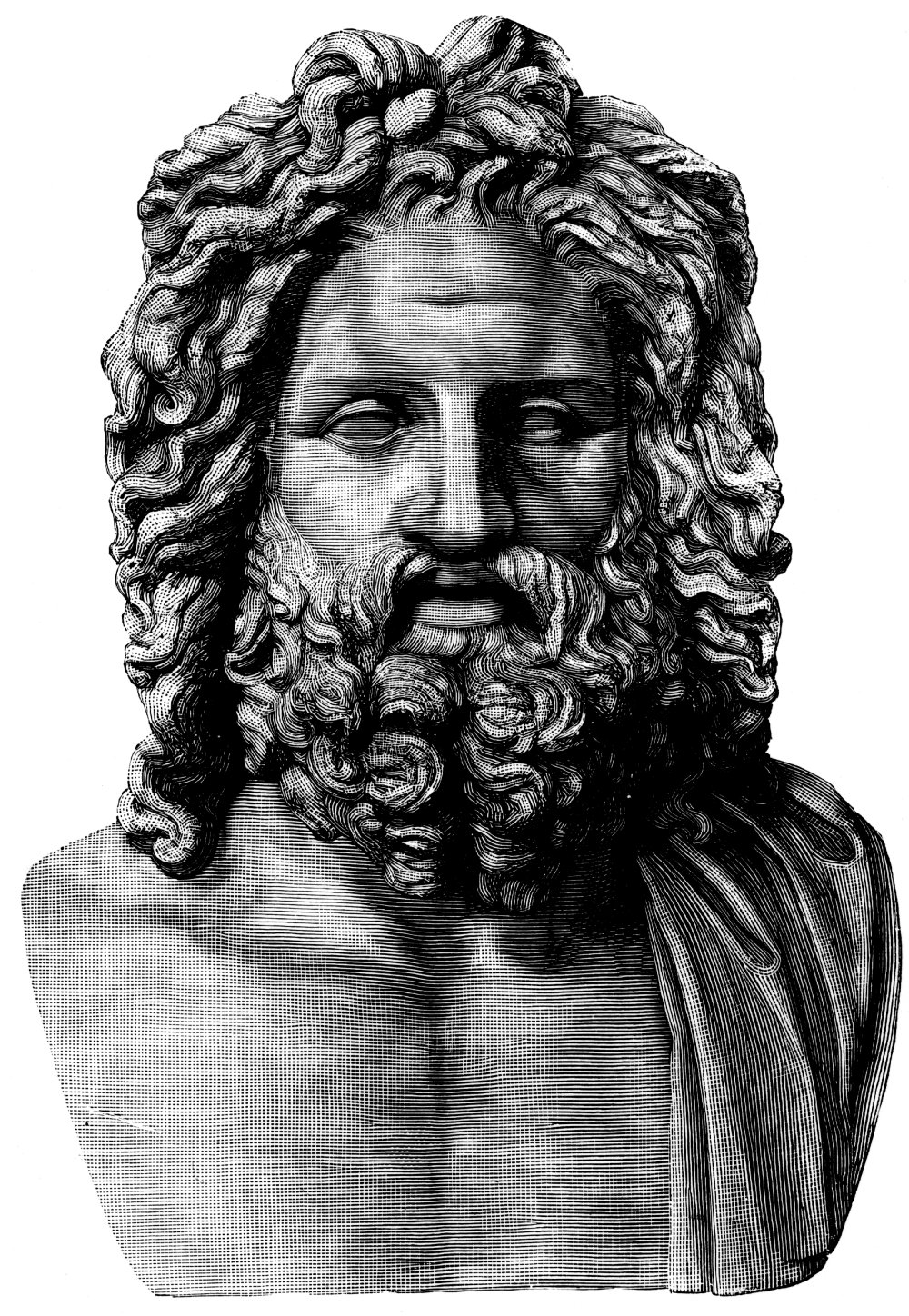
A bust of Zeus.

== List ==
=== A ===
- Abrettenus (Ἀβρεττηνός) or Abretanus: surname of Zeus in Mysia
- Achad: one of his names in Syria.
- Acraeus (Ακραίος; "of the Height"): his name at Smyrna. Acraea and Acraeus are also attributes given to various goddesses and gods whose temples were situated upon hills, such as Zeus, Hera, Aphrodite, Pallas, Artemis, and others
- Acrettenus: his name in Mysia.
- Adad: one of his names in Syria.
- Adados: A Hellenization of the Canaanite Hadad and Assyrian Adad, particularly his solar cult at Heliopolis
- Adultus: from his being invoked by adults, on their marriage.
- Aegiduchos (Αἰγιδούχος) or Aegiochos (Αἰγίοχος): Usually taken as Zeus as the bearer of the Aegis, the divine shield with the head of Medusa across it, although others derive it from "goat" (αἴξ) and okhē (οχή) in reference to Zeus's nurse, the divine goat Amalthea.
- Aeneius (Αἰνήιος) or Aenesios ( Αἰνήσιος), was worshipped in Cephalonia, where he had a temple on Mount Ainos.
- Aethiops (Αἰθίοψ), meaning the glowing or the black. He was worshipped in Chios.
- Aetnaeus (Αἰτναῖος), due to the Mount Etna. There was a statue of Zeus and a festival was celebrated there.
- Agamemnon (Ἀγαμέμνων), was worshipped at Sparta. Eustathius believes that the epithet is because of the resemblance between Zeus and Agamemnon, while others believe that it signifying the Eternal, from ἀγὰν and μένων.
- Agetor (Ἀγήτωρ), leader and ruler of men.
- Agonius (Ἀγώνιος), helper in struggles and contests.
- Agoreus (Ἀγοραίος), of the market/agora
- Aleios (Ἄλειος), from "Helios" and perhaps connected to water as well.
- Alexicacus (Ἀλεξίκακος), the averter of evil.
- Amboulios (Αμβουλιος, "Counsellor") or Latinized Ambulius
- Anchesmius (Αγχέσμιος; "of Hill Anchesmos").
- Apemius (Apemios, Απημιος): Zeus as the averter of ills
- Apesantius (Ἀπεσάντιος): of mount Apesas.
- Apomyius (Απομυιος): Zeus as one who dispels flies
- Aphesios (Αφεσιος; "Releasing (Rain)")
- Areius (Αρειος): either "warlike" or "the atoning one".
- Argikeravnos (ἀργικέραυνος; "of the flashing bolt").
- Asbamaeus (Ἀσβαμαῖος): Zeus as a god of oaths
- Astrapios (ἀστραπαῖός; "Lightninger"): Zeus as a weather god
- Atabyrius (Ἀταβύριος): he was worshipped in Rhodes and took his name from the Mount Atabyrus on the island
- Athous (Αθώος), derived from Mount Athos, on which the god had a temple.
- Aithrios (Αἴθριος, "of the Clear Sky").
- Aitherios (Αἰθέριος, "of Aether").

=== B ===
- Basileus (Βασιλευς, "King, Chief, Ruler")
- Belos (Βῆλος): Syncretization of Zeus with the Babylonian god Marduk mentioned in Herodotus’s Histories. "Belos" comes from Marduk’s title of Bel meaning "lord" or "master" in Akkadian.
- Bottiaeus/ Bottaios (Βοττιαίος, "of the Bottiaei"): Worshipped at Antioch Libanius wrote that Alexander the Great founded the temple of Zeus Bottiaios, in the place where later the city of Antioch was built.
- Zeus Bouleus/ Boulaios (Βουλαίος, "of the Council"): Worshipped at Dodona, the earliest oracle, along with Zeus Naos
- Brontios and Brontaios (Βρονταῖος, "Thunderer"): Zeus as a weather god

=== C ===
- Cenaean (Kenaios/ Kenaius, Κηναῖος): a surname of Zeus, derived from cape Cenaeum
- Chrysaoreus (Χρυσαορεύς, "Of the golden sword")
- Chthonios (Χθόνιος, "of the earth or underworld")
- Cronides (Κρονίδης, "son of Cronus")
- Casius/Casian (Κάσιος and Κάσσιος), derived from Mount Casius. There were two mountains called Casius that were sacred to Zeus: one near Antioch and another in Egypt.

=== D ===
- Diabaterios (Διαβατήριος; "of Safe Passage").
- Diktaios (Δικταιος): Zeus as lord of the Dikte mountain range, worshipped from Mycenaean times on Crete
- Dodonian/ Dodonaios (Δωδωναῖος): meaning of Dodona
- Dylsios (Δύλσιος)

=== E ===
- Eilapinastes (Εἰλαπιναστής, "Feaster"). He was worshipped in Cyprus.
- Ephestios (Ἐφέστιος, "of the domestic hearth").
- Epikarpios (ἐπικάρπιος, "of the fruits").
- Eleutherios (Ἐλευθέριος, "of freedom"). At Athens after the Battle of Plataea, Athenians built the Stoa of Zeus Eleutherios. Some writers said that was called "of freedom" because free men built the portico near his shrine, while others because Athenians escaped subjection to the power of Persia and they were free.
- Epidôtês/ Epidotes (Επιδωτης; "Giver of Good"): an epithet of Zeus at Mantineia and Sparta
- Euênemos/ Euanemos (Ευηνεμος; "of Fair Winds", "Giver of Favourable Wind") or Latinized Evenemus/ Evanemus
- Euryopa (Εὐρύοπα; "Far-seeing").

=== G ===
- Genetaeus (Γενηταίος), derived from Cape Genetus on the Euxine.
- Genethlios (Γενέθλιός; "of birth").
- Georgos (Ζεὺς Γεωργός, "Zeus the Farmer"): Zeus as god of crops and the harvest, worshipped in Athens

=== H ===
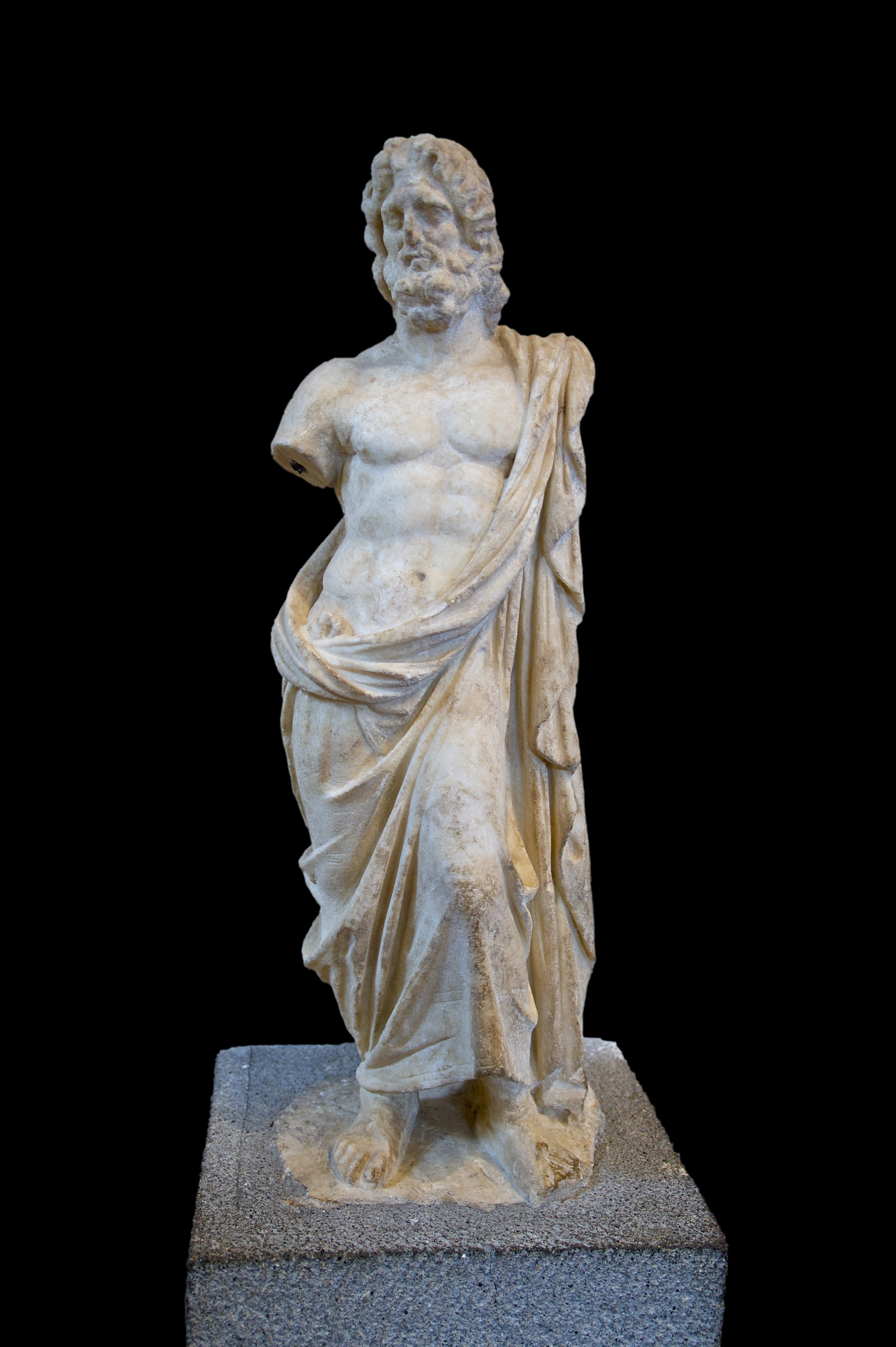
Statuette of Zeus from late Hellenistic period, Camirus, Rhodes.

- Hecalesius, a festival named Hecalesia (Εκαλήσια) was celebrated at Athens in honour of Zeus Hecalesius and Hecale.
- Helioupolites ("Heliopolite" or "Heliopolitan Zeus"): A Hellenization of the Canaanite Baʿal (probably Hadad) worshipped as a sun god at Heliopolis (modern Baalbek) in Lebanon
- Herkeios (Ἑρκεῖος, "of the Household") or Latinized Herceius
- Hetareios (Ἑταιρεῖος, "of fellowship"): According to the Suda, Zeus was called this among the Cretans.
- Hikesios (Ἱκεσιος; "of Suppliants") or Latinized Hicesius
- Homagyrius (Ὁμαγύριος; "Assembler"), he had a sanctuary at Aegium. According to tradition, he was given this surname because Agamemnon assembled the most eminent men of Greece there to consult on how to wage the Trojan War.
- Horios (Ὅριος; "of the borders").
- Horkios (Ὅρκιος): Zeus as keeper of oaths. Pausanias writes that at Olympia, in the Council Chamber (Bouleuterion), there was a statue of Zeus Horkios (Oath) which was the most fearsome to wrongdoers, holding thunderbolts in both hands. Athletes, along with their families and trainers, swore oaths on slices of boar’s flesh to compete fairly and adhere to training rules. Officials who judged the races also swore to be honest and keep all information confidential. A bronze plate inscribed with warning verses stood before the statue, intended to intimidate anyone who might break their oath.
- Homognios (ὁμόγνιος; "of kindred")
- Hyetios (Ὑετιος; "of the Rain")
- Hymettius (Ὑμήττιος; "of Mount Hymettus").
- Hypatos (Ὑπατος, "Supreme, Most High"), was an epithet and surname of Zeus. There was an altar dedicated to him in Athens, in front of the Erechtheium, where it was forbidden to sacrifice anything alive or pour libations, offerings were limited to cakes. He was also worshipped in Sparta and near Glisas in Boeotia.
- Hyperdexios (Ὑπερδέξιος), from the village Hyperdexion.
- Hypsibremetes (Ὑψιβρεμέτης, "High-thundering").
- Hypsistos (Ὕψιστος, "Supreme, Most High")

=== I ===
- Idaeus or Idaios (Ἰδαῖος), of mount Ida. Either Mount Ida in Crete or Mount Ida in the ancient Troad
- Idao (Ἰαῶ), was the syncretization of Zeus with Yahweh started by Alexander the Great in his efforts to peacefully expand hellenism. Hellenizing Jews referred to him as Baal Shamen and El Hashamayim (in English, "Lord of Heaven" and "God of Heavens", respectively).
- Ikmaios (Ικμαιος; "of Moisture") or Latinized Icmaeus
- Ithomatas (Ιθωμάτας), an annual festival celebrated at Ithome for Zeus Ithomatas.

=== K ===
- Kasios ("Zeus of Mount Kasios" the modern Jebel Aqra) or Latinized Casius: a surname of Zeus, the name may have derived from either sources, one derived from Casion, near Pelusium in Egypt. Another derived from Mount Kasios (Casius), which is the modern Jebel Aqra, is worshipped at a site on the Syrian–Turkish border, a Hellenization of the Canaanite mountain and weather god Baal Zephon
- Kataibates (Καταιβάτης, "descending") or Latinized Cataebates, because he was sending-down thunderbolts or because he was descending to earth due to his love of women.
- Katharsios (Καθάρσιος, "purifying").
- Keraunios (Κεραυνιος; "of the Thunderbolt") or Latinized Ceraunius
- Klarios (Κλαριος; "of the Lots") or Latinized Clarius
- Konios (Κονιος; "of the Dust") or Latinized Conius
- Koryphaios (Κορυφαιος, "Chief, Leader") or Latinized Coryphaeus
- Kosmêtês (Κοσμητης; "Orderer") or Latinized Cosmetes
- Kronios (Κρόνιος; "son of Cronus")
- Ktesios (Κτησιος; "of the House, Property") or Latinized Ctesius
- Ktistes (Κτίστης; “Founder”)

=== L ===
- Labrandos (Λαβρανδευς; "Furious, Raging", "Zeus of Labraunda"): Worshiped at Caria, depicted with a double-edged axe (labrys), a Hellenization of the Hurrian weather god Teshub
- Laphystius (Λαφύστιος; "of Laphystium"), Laphystium was a mountain in Boeotia on which there was a temple to Zeus.
- Laoetas or Laoitas (Λαοίτας; "of the People").
- Limenoskopos (Λιμενοσκοπος; "Watcher of Sea-Havens") or Latinized Limenoscopus occurs as a surname of several deities, Zeus, Artemis, Aphrodite, Priapus and Pan
- Lepsinos, there is a temple of Zeus Lepsinos at Euromus.
- Leukaios (Λευκαῖος Ζεύς; "Zeus of the white poplar")
- Lykaios or Lycean (Λύκαιος), there was a temple of Zeus Lykaios ("Wolf") on Mount Lykaion in Arcadia, where according to sources a lycanthropic cult was performed, sometimes including human sacrifices.

=== M ===
- Maimaktês (Μαιμάκτης; "Boisterous", "the Stormy") or Latinized Maemactes, a surname of Zeus, from which the name of the Attic calendar month 'Maimakterion' (Μαιμακτηριών, Latinized Maemacterion) was derived and which that month the Maimakteria was celebrated at Athens.
- Meilichios/ Meilikhios (Μειλίχιος; "Zeus the Easily-Entreated") There was a sanctuary south of the Ilissos river at Athens.
- Mêkhaneus (Μηχανευς; "Contriver") or Latinized Mechaneus
- Metieta (Μητίετα; "the counsellor").
- Moiragetes (Μοιραγέτης; "Leader of the Fates", "Guide or Leader of Fate"): Pausanias wrote that this was a surname of Zeus and Apollo at Delphi because Zeus knew the affairs of men, all that the Fates give them, and all that is not destined for them.

=== N ===
- Zeus Naos: Worshipped at Dodona, the earliest oracle, along with Zeus Bouleus
- Nemeian or Nemean or Nemeus: There was a sanctuary of Nemean Zeus at Argos, and an upright bronze statue of the god made by Lysippus.
- Nephelegereta (Νεφεληγερέτα; "cloud-gatherer").
- Nikephoros (Νικηφόρος; "Bringer of Victory").

=== O ===
- Olympios (Ολύμπιος): Zeus as king of the gods and patron of the Panhellenic Games at Olympia
- Ombrios (Ομβριος; "of the Rain", "Rain-Giver")
- Ouranios (Οὐράνιος, "Heavenly").
- Ourios (Οὐριος, "of Favourable Wind"). Ancient writers wrote about a sanctuary at the opening of the Black Sea dedicated to the Zeus Ourios (ἱερὸν τοῦ Διὸς τοῦ Οὐρίου). In addition, on the island of Delos a dedication to Zeus Ourios was found. The dedication was made by a citizen of Ascalon, named Damon son of Demetrius, who escaped from pirates.
- Osogoa (Ὀσογῶα), the Carian name of Zeus at Mylasa. There was a sanctuary of him in the city.

=== P ===
- Palaimnios (Παλαμναῖος; "of Vengeance")
- Panamaros (Πανάμαρος; 'of Panamara'). There was a sanctuary of Zeus Panamaros near the city of Stratonicea in Caria.
- Panhellenius (Πανελλήνιος, "of all the Greeks/Common to all Greeks"): worshipped at Aeacus's temple on Aegina
- Pankrates (Πανκρατής; "the almighty")
- Panomphaeus (Πανομφαῖος; "the one who originates and gives meaning to all signs and omens").
- Parnethius (Παρνήθιος; "of Mount Parnitha").
- Patrios (Πάτριος; "paternal")
- Pelorios (Πελώριος), sacrifices were offered to Zeus Pelorios, during the Thessalian festival of Peloria.
- Phratrios (Φράτριος), as patron of a phratry
- Philios (Φιλιος; "of Friendship") or Latinized Philius
- Phyxios (Φυξιος; "of Refuge") or Latinized Phyxius
- Pistios (Πίστιος; "of faith and fidelity") or Latinized Pistius
- Plousios (Πλουσιος; "of Wealth") or Latinized Plusius
- Pogonietes (Πωγωνιήτης) and Pogonites (Πωγωνίτης), both meaning "the Bearded One". The Suda is the only known source that explicitly records these terms as epithets of Zeus.
- Polieus (Πολιεὺς; "from cities (poleis").

=== S ===
- Skotitas (Σκοτιτας; "Dark, Murky") or Latinized Scotitas
- Sêmaleos (Σημαλεος; "Giver of Signs") or Latinized Semaleus:
- Sosipolis (Σωσίπολις; "City saviour"): There was a temple of Zeus Sosipolis at Magnesia on the Maeander
- Soter (Σωτήρ; "Saviour")
- Splanchnotomus ("Entrails cutter"), he was worshipped in Cyprus.
- Sthenius (Σθένιος; "Strong"), he had an altar in Hermione and also a festival named Sthenia (σθένια) celebrated in his honour.
- Stratios (Στράτιος; "Of armies").

=== T ===
- Zeus Tallaios ("Solar Zeus"): Worshipped on Crete
- Teleios (Τελειος; "of Marriage Rites") or Latinized Teleus
- Terpikeraunos (Τερπικέραυνος; "who delights in thunder").
- Theos Agathos (Θεος Αγαθος; "the Good God") or Latinized Theus Agathus
- Tropaioukhos/ Tropaiuchos (τροπαιοῦχος, "Guardian of Trophies"): after the Battle of the 300 Champions, Othryades, dedicated the trophy to "Zeus, Guardian of Trophies" .

=== X ===
- Xenios (Ξενιος; "of Hospitality, Strangers") or Latinized Xenius: Zeus as the patron of hospitality (xenia) and guests, avenger of wrongs done to strangers

=== Z ===
- Zygius (Ζυγίος): As the presider over marriage. His wife Hera had also the epithet Zygia (Ζυγία). These epithets describing them as presiding over marriage.
