= Greek wrestling =

Ancient Greek sport

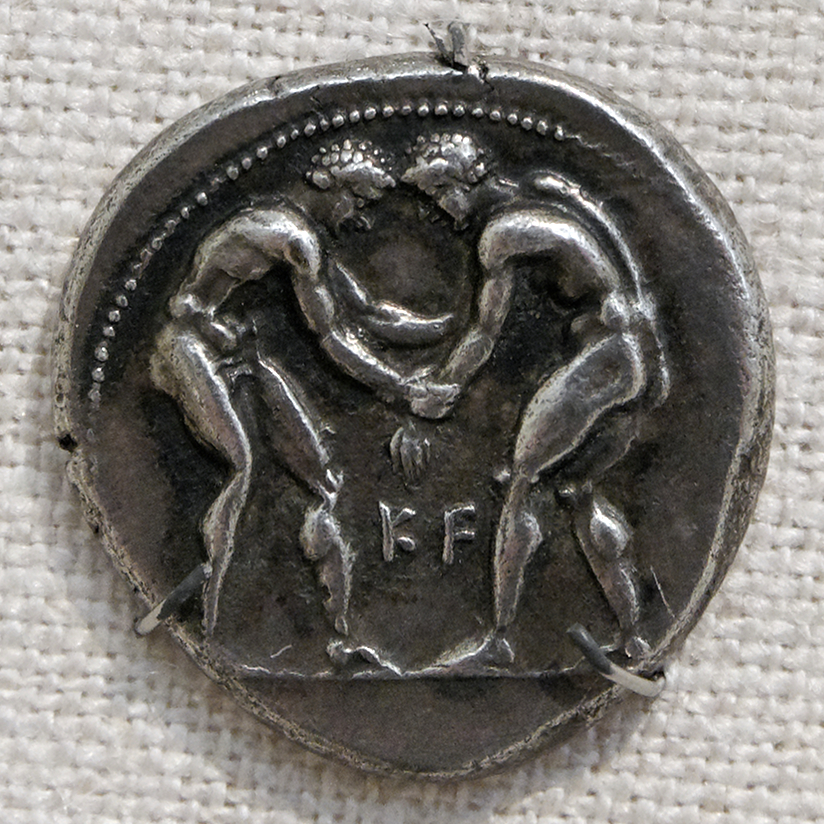
- a silver stater of Aspendos, Pamphilia (c.380-325 BC)
- Also known as: Roman wrestling
- Focus: Wrestling
- Country of origin: Ancient Greece
- Olympic sport: Yes (ancient Olympics only)

Greek wrestling (Ancient Greek: πάλη, romanized: pálē), also known as Ancient Greek wrestling and Pále (πάλη), was the most popular organized sport in Ancient Greece. A point was scored when one player touched the ground with his back, hip or shoulder, or conceding defeat due to a submission-hold or was forced out of the wrestling-area. Three points had to be scored to win the match.

One particularly important position in this form of wrestling was one where one of the contestants was lying on his abdomen with the other on his back trying to strangle him (back mount). The athlete on the bottom would try to grasp an arm of the one on top and turn him over onto his back while the athlete on top would try to complete the choke without being rolled.

Wrestling was the first competition to be added to the Olympic Games that was not a footrace. It was added in 708 B.C. (Miller, 46). The competitions were held in elimination-tournament style until one wrestler was crowned the victor. The wrestling area was one square plethron or stremma. This event was also part of the pentathlon. Wrestling was regarded as the best expression of strength out of all of the competitions and was represented in Greek mythology by Heracles.

According to ancient writers the Sthenia festival included various contests, most notably wrestling which was accompanied by flute music.

== Famous wrestlers from antiquity ==
Milo of Croton was one of the most famous wrestlers from this ancient time period. At one set of games, no one challenged him, but as he walked to the skamma he slipped and fell and was harassed by the crowd as they claimed he shouldn't be crowned because he fell. He contested that he should be crowned because he had only fallen once, two short of the required at least three times (Martin, 50).

Leontiskos of Messene was also a noted champion. He was not known for his good wrestling skills, but for his superior finger bending skills. He was able to bend right up to the point of disqualification and won two championships with this technique (Martin, 50). According to Suda, he was called Akrokhersites (Ἀκροχερσίτης), because he used to break the fingers of his opponent.

Suda writes about the wrestler Kleostratos (Ancient Greek: Κλεόστρατος) of Rhodes who won a victory in wrestling by throttling his opponent. The wrestler Topsius (Ancient Greek: Τόψιος) was the brother of the philosopher, Dio of Alexandria. Demosthenes mention the Euthynus (Εὔθυνος), and write that he was a famous wrestler. Aelian mention the wrestler Democrates (Δημοκράτης). Diogenes Laertius mention the wrestler Ariston (Ἀρίστων) from Argos.

Pausanias mention many wrestlers and statues of them:

- Perilaus (Περίλαος) of Argos, son of Alcenor (Ἀλκήνωρ).
- Tisamenus (Τισαμενός) of Elis.
- Hetoemocles (Ἑτοιμοκλής) of Laconia, son of Hipposthenes (see below).
- Hipposthenes (Ἱπποσθένης) of Laconia, father of Hetoemocles (see above).
- Strato (Στράτων) of Alexandria.
- Caprus (Κάπρος) of Elis.
- Aristomenes (Ἀριστομένης) of Rhodes.
- Protophanes (Πρωτοφάνης) of Magnesia on the Meander.
- Marion (Μαρίων) of Alexandria.
- Aristeas (Ἀριστέας) of Stratoniceia.
- Nicostratus (Νικόστρατος) of Cilicia.
- Polyctor (Πολύκτωρ), son of Damonicus (Δαμόνικος).
- Sosander (Σώσανδρος) of Smyrna, son of Sosander.
- Symmachus (Σύμμαχος) of Elis, son of Aeschylus (Αἰσχύλος).
- Archedamus (Ἀρχέδαμος) of Elis, son of Xenius (Ξενίος).
- Cratinus (Κρατῖνος) of Aegeira.
- Nicostratus (Νικόστρατος) of Heraea, son of Xenocleides (Ξενοκλείδης).
- Chilon of Patras.
- Leontiscus (Λεοντίσκος) from Messene.
- Narycidas (Ναρυκίδας) from Phigalia, son of Damaretus (Δαμαρέτος).
- Agenor (Ἀγήνορ) of Thebes, son of Theopompus (Θεόπομπος).
- Lastratidas (Λαστρατίδας) of Elis, son of Paraballon (Παραβάλλον).
- Amertes (Ἀμέρτης) of Elis.
- Euanoridas (Εὐανορίδᾳς) of Elis.
- Theognetus (Θεογνήτος) of Aegina.
- Xenocles (Ξενοκλῆς) of Maenalus.
- Cheimon (Χείμων) of Argos, son of Aristeus (Ἀριστεὺς).
- Taurosthenes (Ταυροσθένης) of Aegina.
- Philles (Φίλλης) of Elis.
- Lysippus (Λύσιππος) of Elis.
- Baucis (Βαύκις) of Troezen.
- Euthymenes (Εὐθυμένης) of Maenalus.
- Theopompus (Θεόπομπος), son of Theopompus.
- Pantarces (Παντάρκης) of Elis.
- Pherias (Φερίας) of Aegina.
- Nicasylus (Νικασύλος) of Rhodes.
- Artemidorus (Ἀρτεμίδωρος) of Tralles.
- Anauchidas (Ἀναυχίδας) of Elis, son of Philys.
- Procles (Προκλῆς) of Andros, son of Lycastidas (Λυκαστίδας).
- Cleitomachus (Κλειτομάχος) of Thebes, son of Hermocrates (Ἑρμοκράτης).
- Eutelidas (Εὐτελίδᾳς) the Spartan.
- Pherenicus (Φερενίκος) of Elis.
- Seleadas (Σελεάδᾳς) of Laconia.
- Calliteles (Καλλιτέλης) of Laconia, father of the four-horse chariot victor Polypeithes (Πολυπείθης).
- Paeanius (Παιάνιος) of Elis, son of Damatrius (Δαματρίος).
- Democrates (Δημοκράτης) of Tenedos.
- Hermesianax (Ἑρμησιάναξ) of Colophon, son of Agoneus (Ἀγονέος).
- Eicasius (Εἰκάσιος) of Colophon, son of Lycinus (Λυκίνος) and the daughter of Hermesianax (see above).
- Alexinicus (Ἀλεξίνικός) of Elis.
- Chaeron (Χαίρων) of Pellene.

== Rules ==
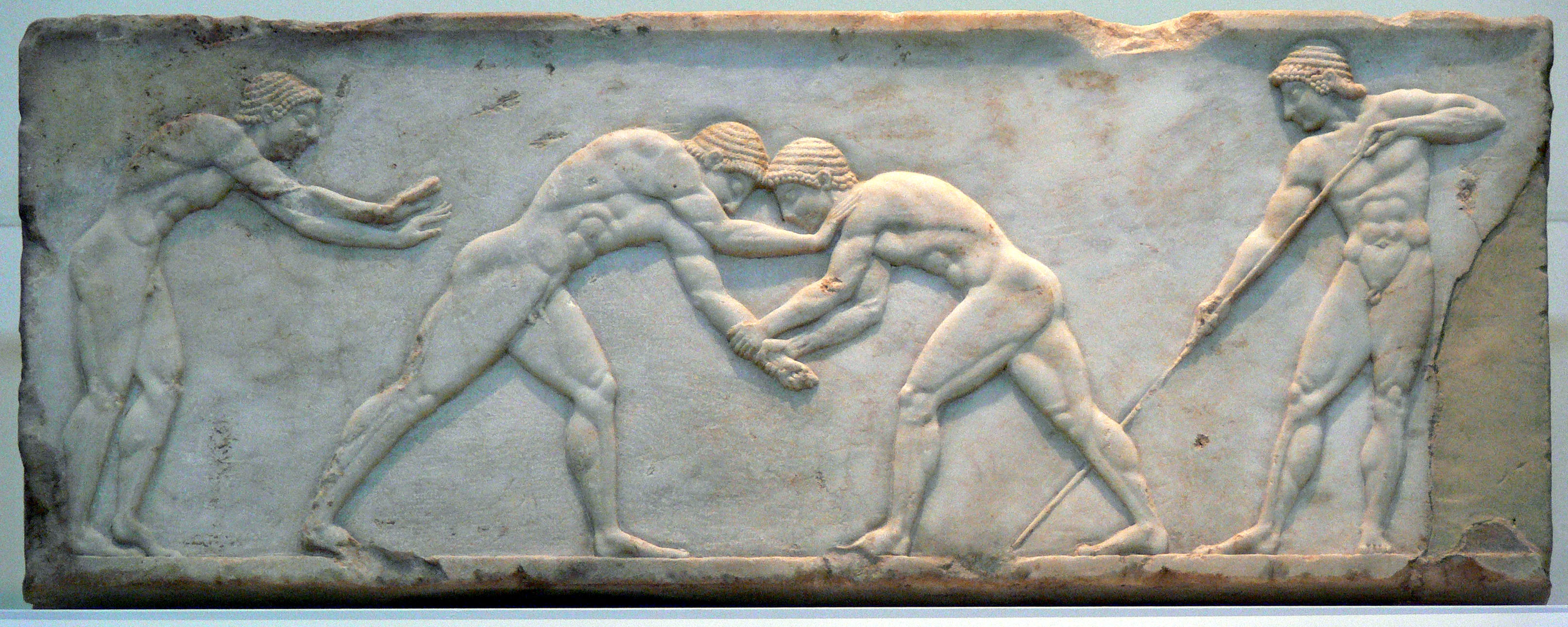
Funerary relief (510–500 BC) depicting wrestlers

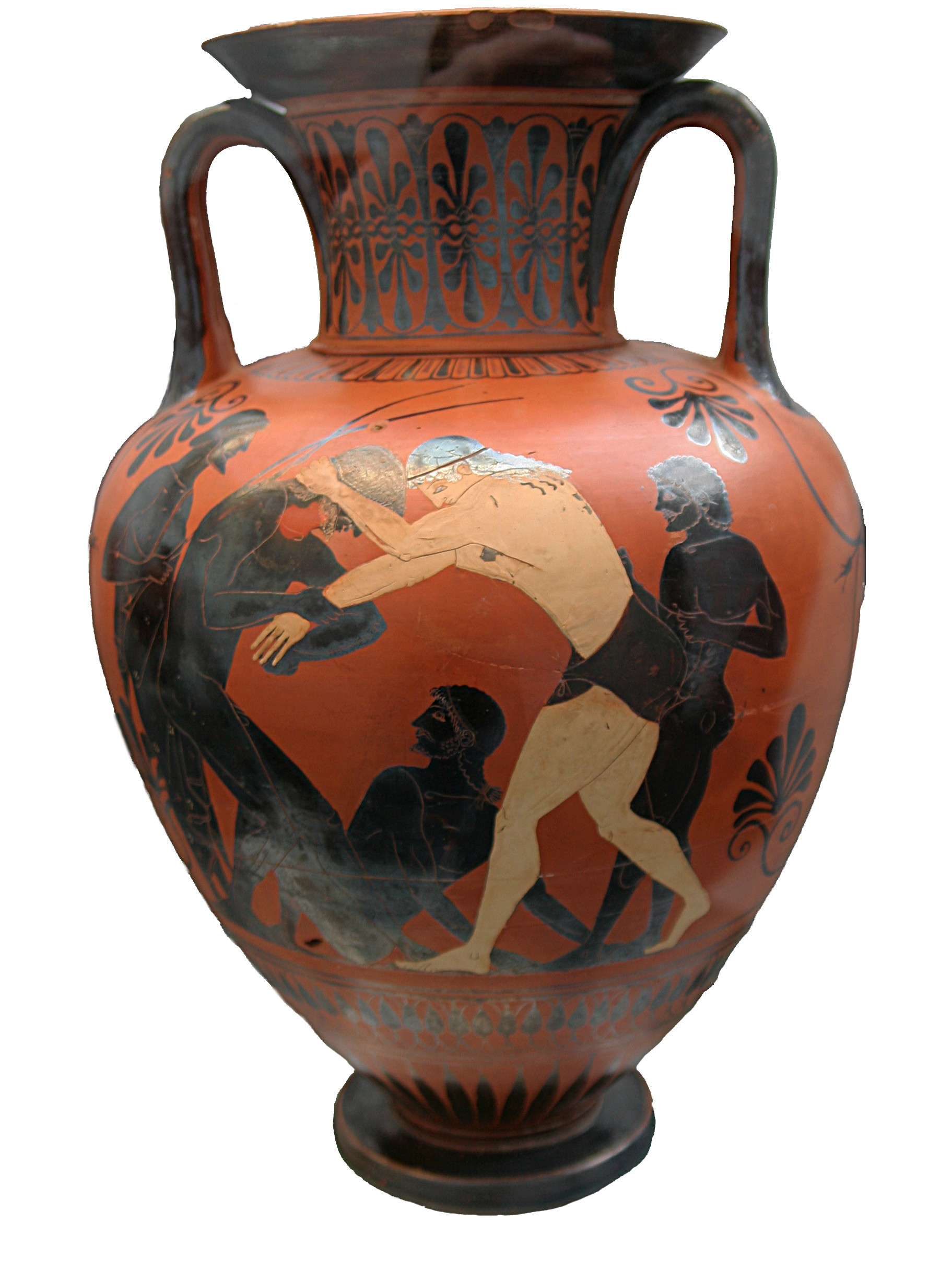
Peleus and Atalanta wrestling (Painter of Munich name vase, Attic black-figure amphora, 500–490 BC)

These are the rules of the ancient sport Palé:

- No intentional hitting or kicking is permitted
- No gouging the eyes or biting is permitted, since even the Pankration does not allow these
- It is at the discretion of the referee whether or not twisting the fingers with the intention of forcing the opponent to concede defeat is permitted
- Grasping the genitals is prohibited
- All other holds intended to persuade the opponent to concede defeat through pain or fear are permitted and are an integral part of the contest
- Infractions shall be punished by immediate whipping by the referee until the undesirable behaviour is stopped
- Three points must be scored to win the match
- A point can be scored in any of three ways:
  1. the opponent's back touching the ground at any time
  2. by the opponent tapping or in some other way making clear that he concedes defeat through pain or fear
  3. by the opponent making contact with ground outside the allocated wrestling-match ground with any part of his body, or by being lifted and carried out
- After scoring a point, the opponent must be given time to rise on his feet and a few moments more before the wrestling may continue
- The match is both started and ended at the signal of the referee
- The referee can at any time stop the match if he believes a point has been scored but the contestants have continued to wrestle unaware of the point having been scored
- The referee or other officials in charge of the contest, if other officials are presiding, shall resolve any dispute the contestants have over scoring, and their decision shall be final
- The wrestling-ground shall be a large square, 28.5 by 28.5 metres (a Plethron: 100 Greek Feet, the typical width of a running-track), or any other size determined by the holders of the games, and it shall be all of sand or earth
- The contestants shall begin the match at the center of the wrestling-ground outside of each other's touching-range, the precise distance being at the discretion of the referee
- All other more specific details are at the discretion of the officials presiding over the games

== See also ==
- Styles of wrestling
- The Wrestlers, a sculpture
- Wrestling
- Sumo, form of wrestling from Japan with similar rules and regulations
- Pehlwani, form of wrestling from India with similar rules and moves
- Bökh, form of wrestling from Mongolia with similar rules and training
- Greco-Roman wrestling
- P.Oxy. III 466, ancient manuscript containing instructions for wrestling
- Pankration
