= Nemean lion =

Mythical lion killed by Hercules

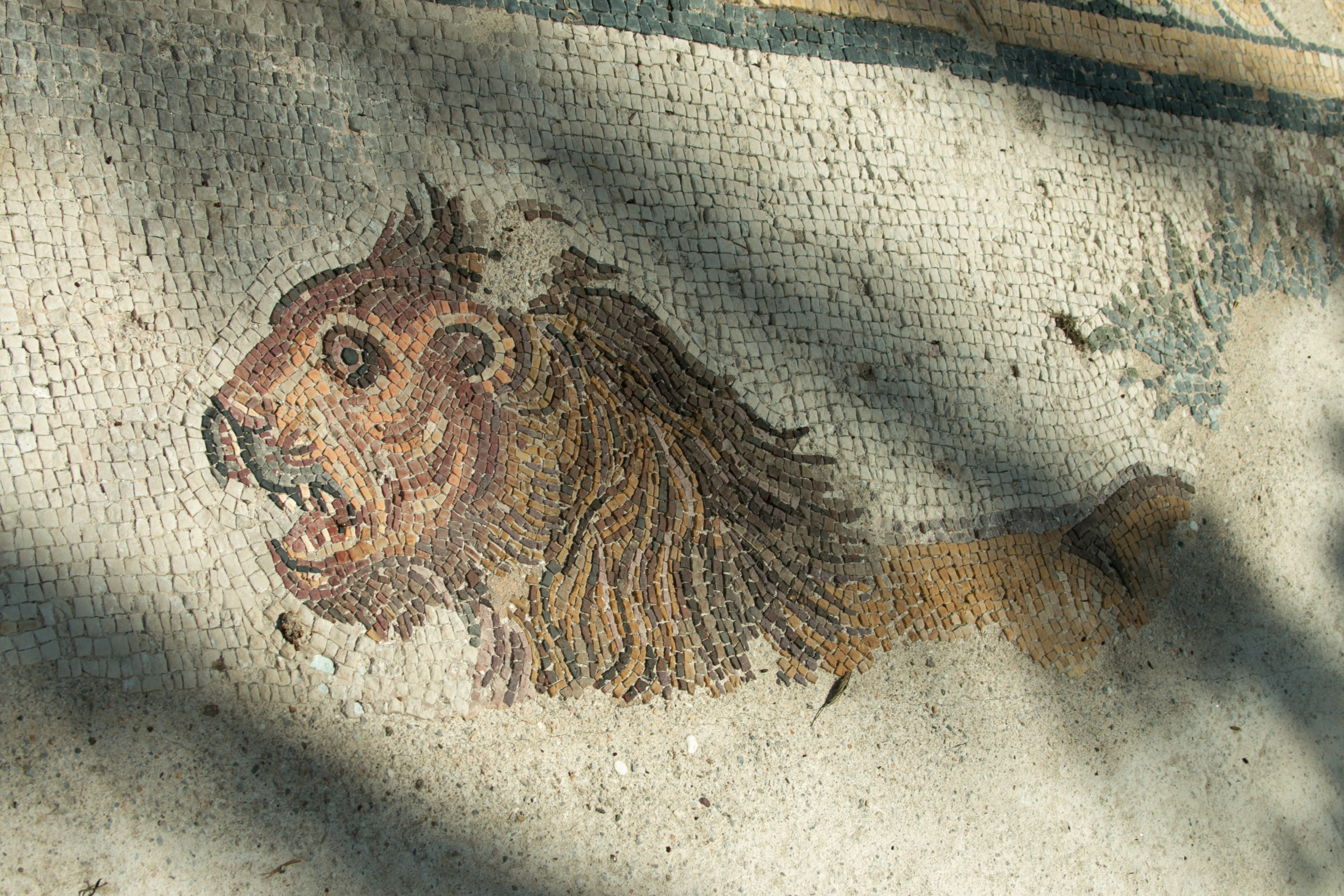
Mosaic: Nemean lion. 3rd century AD; Archaeological Museum of Paros

The Nemean lion (/nɪˈmiːən/; Ancient Greek: Νεμέος λέων, romanized: Neméos léōn; Latin: Leo Nemeaeus) was a mythical lion in Greek mythology that lived at Nemea. It is most famous for being one of the mythical beasts killed by Heracles (Hercules) in his 12 labours. Because its golden fur was impervious to attack, it could not be killed with mortal weapons. Its claws were sharper than mortal swords and could cut through any strong armour. After Heracles killed the lion, its pelt would come to symbolize Heracles and his strength, being used in art to both recognize the myth itself and to draw connections between Heracles' heroism and others.

== Mythical origins ==
Hesiod writes that the Nemean lion is the offspring of Orthus and an ambiguous "she". This "she" is often understood as probably referring to either the Chimera, Echidna, or possibly Ceto. The Nemean lion is also, depending on its parentage, brother to the Theban Sphinx and is of the same lineage as others within the Heracles myth, those being Cerberus and the Lernaean Hydra. Apollodorus, however, depicts the lion as the offspring of Typhon. According to Hesiod, the lion was raised by Hera and sent to terrorize the hills of Nemea. In another tradition, told by Aelian (citing Epimenides) and Hyginus, the lion was "sprung from" the moon-goddess Selene, who threw him from the Moon at Hera's request to mount Apesas. Hera allowed the Nemean lion to hunt within her lands, knowing it would cause more problems for Heracles. In Bibliotheca, Photius wrote that the dragon Ladon, who guarded the golden apples, was the Nemean lion's brother.

== First labour of Heracles ==
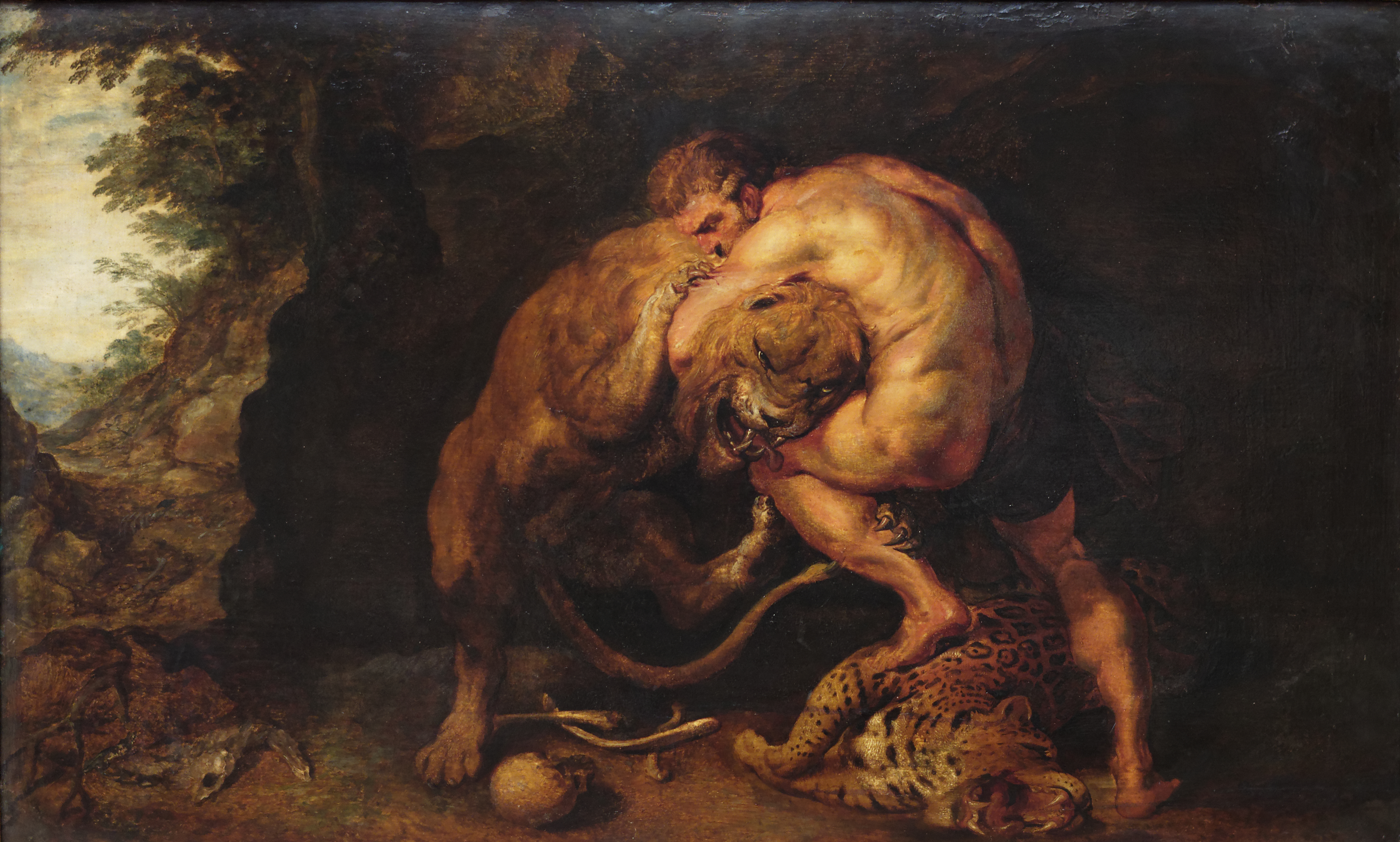
Hercules' fight with the Nemean lion, Pieter Paul Rubens; National Museum of Art of Romania

=== Beginning of the myth ===
The first of Heracles' twelve labours, set by King Eurystheus (his cousin), was to slay the Nemean lion.

Heracles wandered the area until he came to the town of Cleonae. There, he met a boy who said that if Heracles slew the Nemean lion and returned alive within 30 days, then the town would sacrifice a lion to Zeus; if he did not return within 30 days or he died, then the boy would sacrifice himself to Zeus. Another version claims that he met Molorchos, a shepherd who had lost his son to the lion, saying that if he came back within 30 days, then a ram would be sacrificed to Zeus, and that if he did not return within 30 days, then it would be sacrificed to the dead Heracles as a mourning offering.

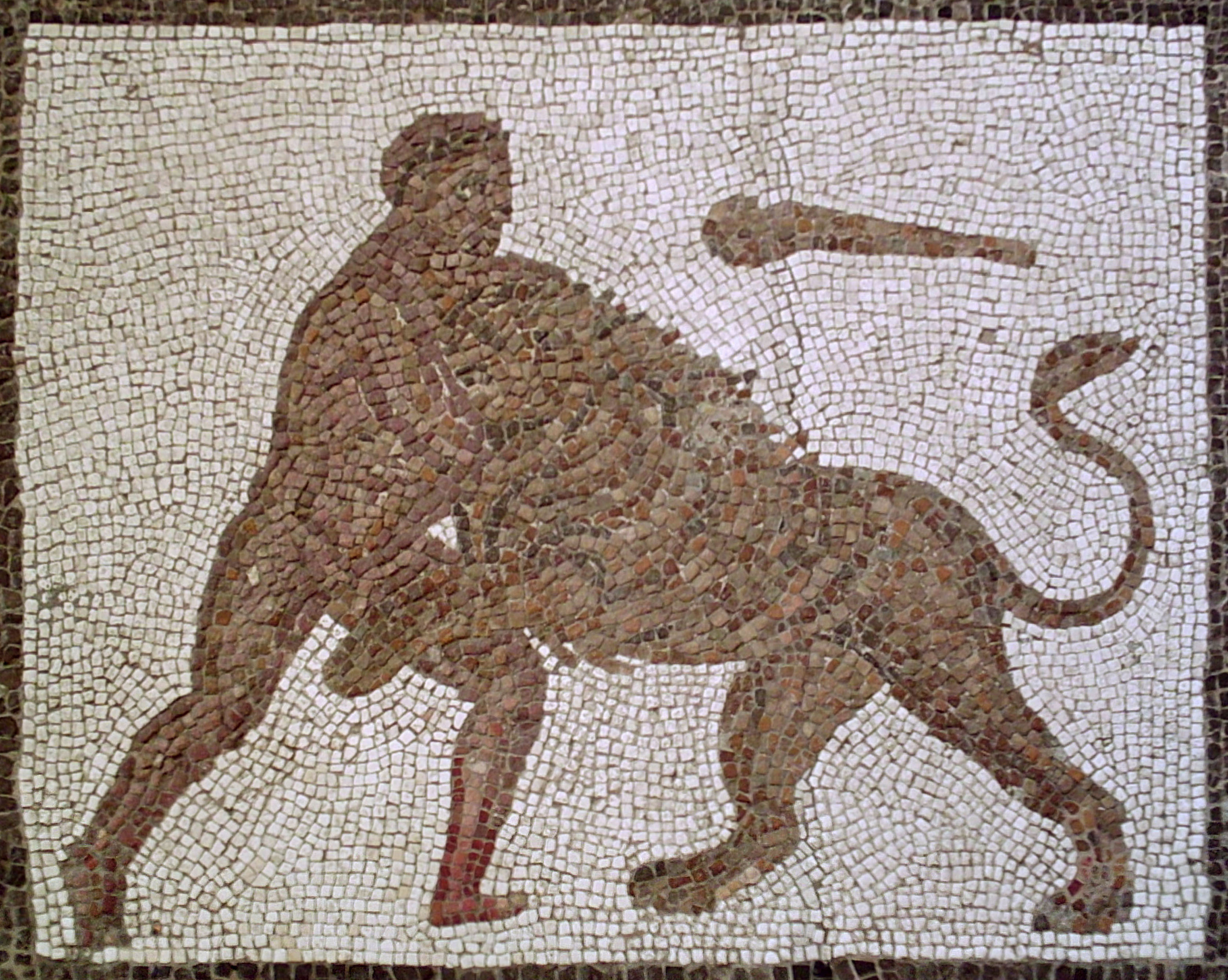
Detail of a Roman mosaic from Llíria, Spain; National Archaeology Museum, Madrid

=== Slaying of the Nemean lion ===
While searching for the lion, Heracles fetched some arrows to use against it, not knowing that its golden fur was impenetrable. When he found the lion and shot at it with his bow, he discovered the fur's protective property after the arrow bounced harmlessly off the creature's thigh. Sometime after this first encounter, Heracles made the lion return to his cave. The cave had two entrances, one of which Heracles blocked; he then entered through the other, making sure the lion had no way to escape. In the dark and close quarters, Heracles stunned the beast with his club. He eventually killed it by strangling it with his bare hands.

=== Skinning the Nemean lion and implications for other labours ===
After slaying the lion, he tried to skin it with a knife from his belt but failed. He then tried sharpening the knife with a stone and even tried with the stone itself. Finally, Athena, noticing the hero's plight, told Heracles to use one of the lion's own claws to skin the pelt. Theocritus, an ancient Greek poet, describes the same circumstance. However, instead of giving the inspiration for the idea to Athena to then give to Heracles, what Theocritus writes is that "Then some god made me think of cutting the Lion's skin with its own claws."

When Heracles returned on the thirtieth day carrying the carcass of the lion on his shoulders, King Eurystheus was amazed and terrified. Eurystheus forbade him from ever entering the city again, and in the future, he was to display the fruits of his labours outside the city gates. After being terrified by Heracles' heroic feat, Eurystheus also had a bronze jar, large enough for him, created and had it dug into the earth so that he could hide in it when Heracles came back for future labours. The Jar can be seen in other labours such as the Erymanthian Boar and bringing Cerberus from the Underworld. After this labour, Eurystheus would only communicate to Heracles through the use of an intermediator named Copreus or the "Dung-man". Eurystheus warned him that the tasks set for him would become increasingly difficult and then sent Heracles off to complete his next quest: to destroy the Lernaean Hydra.

According to Alexander of Myndus, Heracles was helped in this labour by an Earth-born serpent, which followed him to Thebes and settled down in Aulis. It was later identified as the water snake which devoured the sparrows and was turned into stone in the prophecy about the Trojan War.

== Post labour and symbolism ==
Heracles wore the Nemean lion's coat after killing it, as it was impervious to the elements and all but the most powerful weapons. Others say that Heracles' armour was, in fact, the hide of the Lion of Cithaeron. It is also stated in Euripides that the lion pelt Heracles is known for wearing came from the lion he slew within Zeus' grove. No matter where Heracles got the lion's pelt from, however, this element of the myth may have been created post-Homerically, as Stesichorus was the first to give Heracles the costume he is known for. Instead, before this, he seemed to be shown more in line with how a warrior would dress at the time but with no lion skin on him. Thus, as March supposes, the wearing of the lion's fur must have only come after the lion had gained the invulnerability to mortal weapons. The lion could also be seen as a symbol of death, and thus by skinning and then wearing the pelt himself, Heracles took away the threat of death and turned it into deliverance from death.

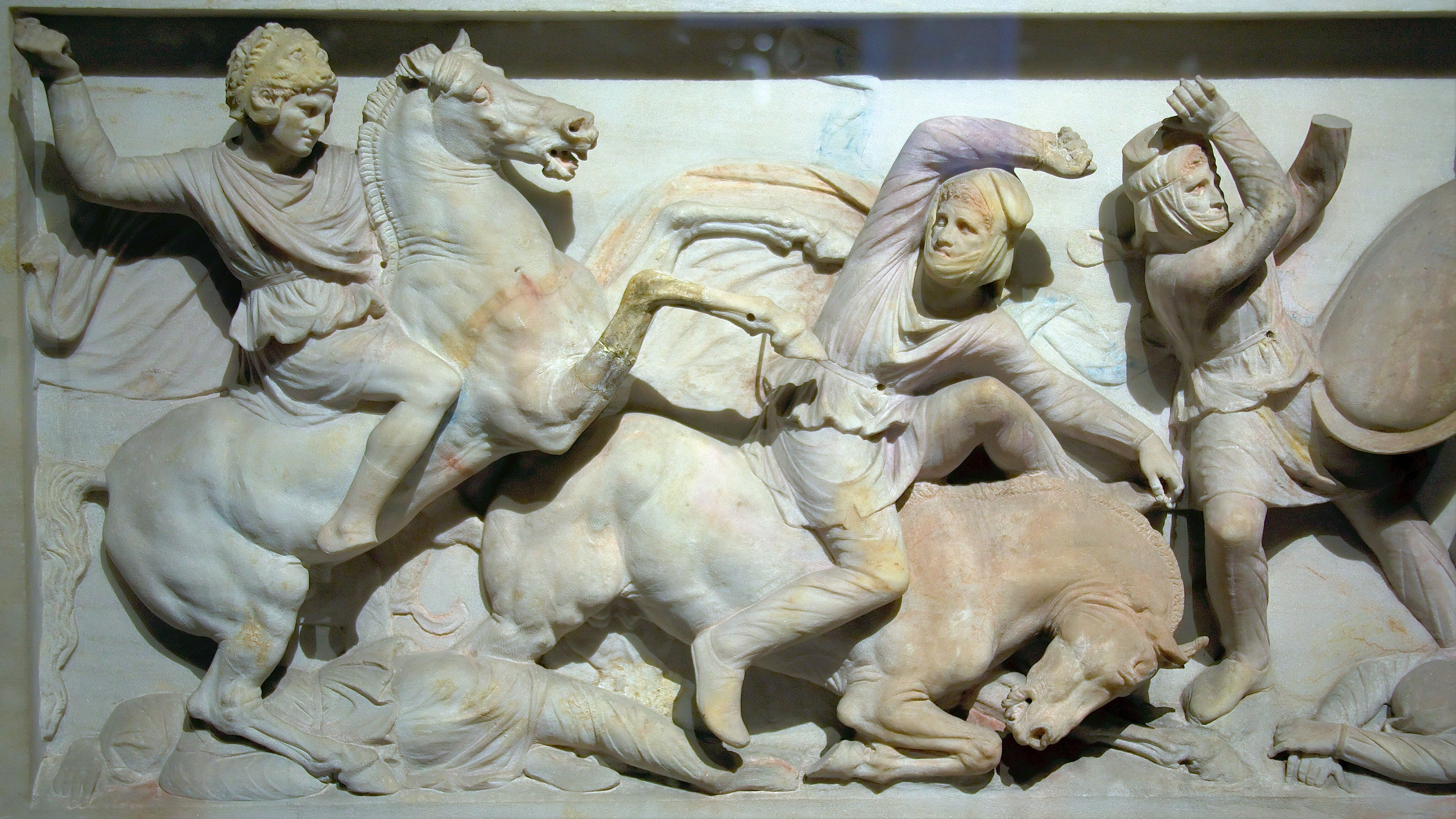
Alexander the Great riding into battle wearing a lion's pelt; Istanbul Archaeological Museum

While the Homeric myth itself does not give any indication on what happens to the lion's skin upon Heracles' death on the pyre, most ancient artistic depictions of this scene show him wearing the pelt as he is set aflame.

The symbolism of the Nemean lion's pelt was also used by some to create a connection between them and Heracles, such as Alexander the Great, who is depicted on the Alexander Sarcophagus wearing a lion's pelt on top of his head as he rides into combat.

To celebrate the heroic accomplishment of Heracles' labour, Zeus used the Nemean lion to create the constellation Leo. The Nemean Games would also later be created, honoring this labour, and like Heracles after defeating the lion, victors would crown themselves with wild celery as a garland.

== In art ==
While most ancient depictions show the Nemean lion in battle with Heracles (who is normally depicted in various stages of dress or nudity), typically wrestling with one another, the mosaic at the beginning of this article is one of the few images where the lion is not either locked in combat with Heracles or dead and being worn by the Greek Hero.

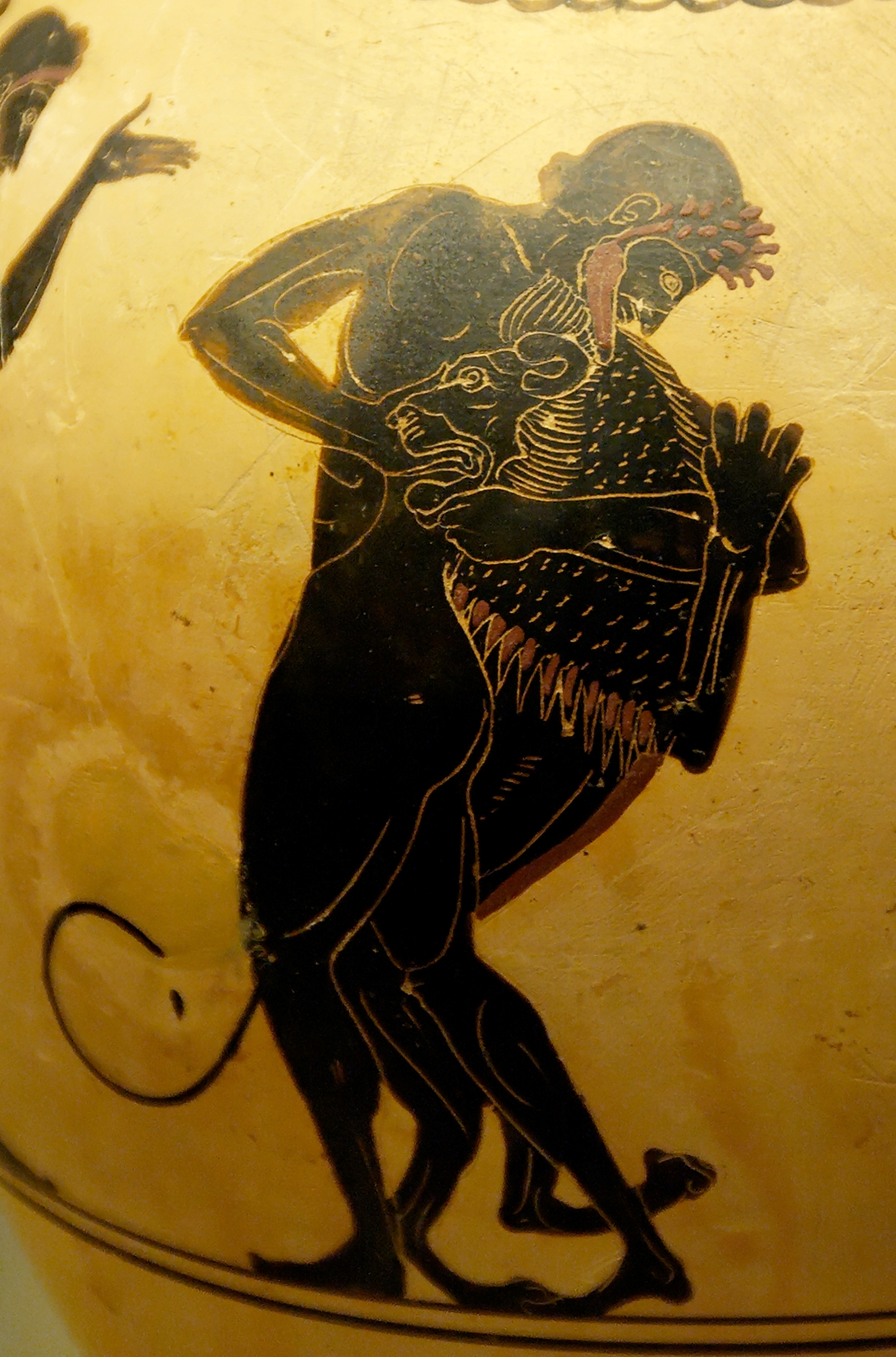
Oinochoe, c. 520–500 BC, from Vulci; British Museum

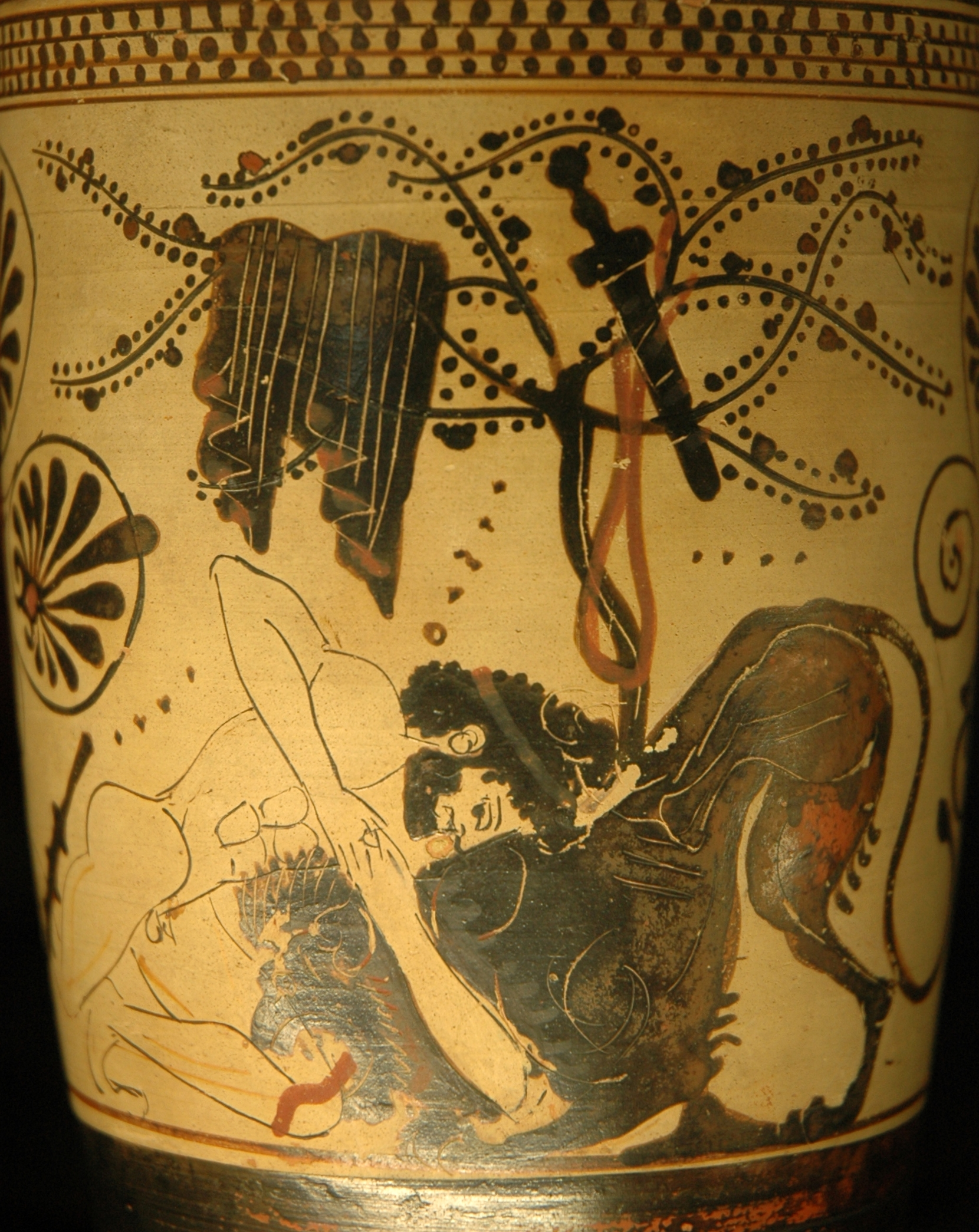
White-ground lekythos, c. 500–475 BC, from Athens, by Diosphos Painter; Louvre, Paris

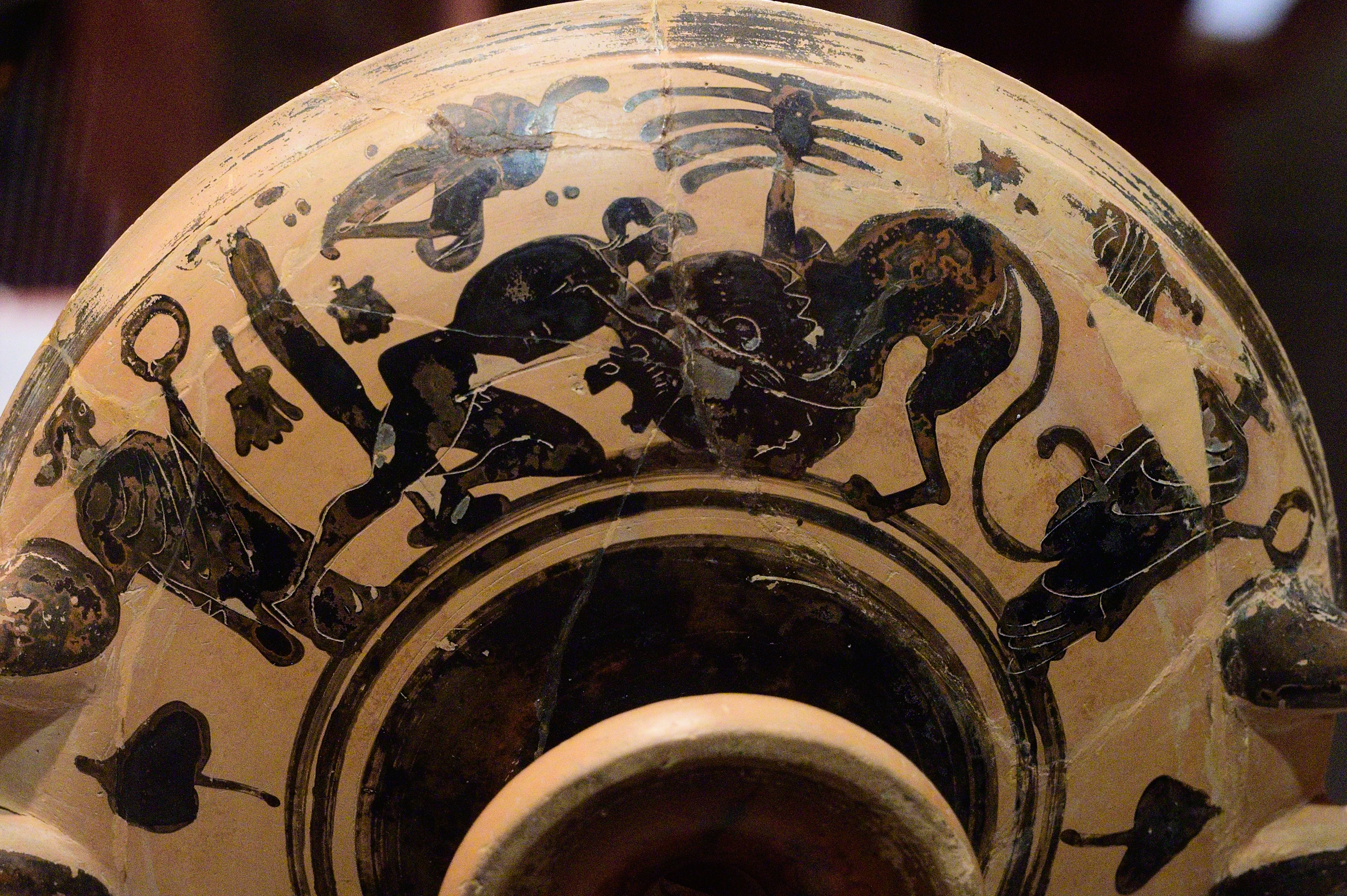
Boeotian Greek pot, c. 475–450 BC, depicting Heracles fighting the Nemean lion; Museum of Cycladic Art, Athens

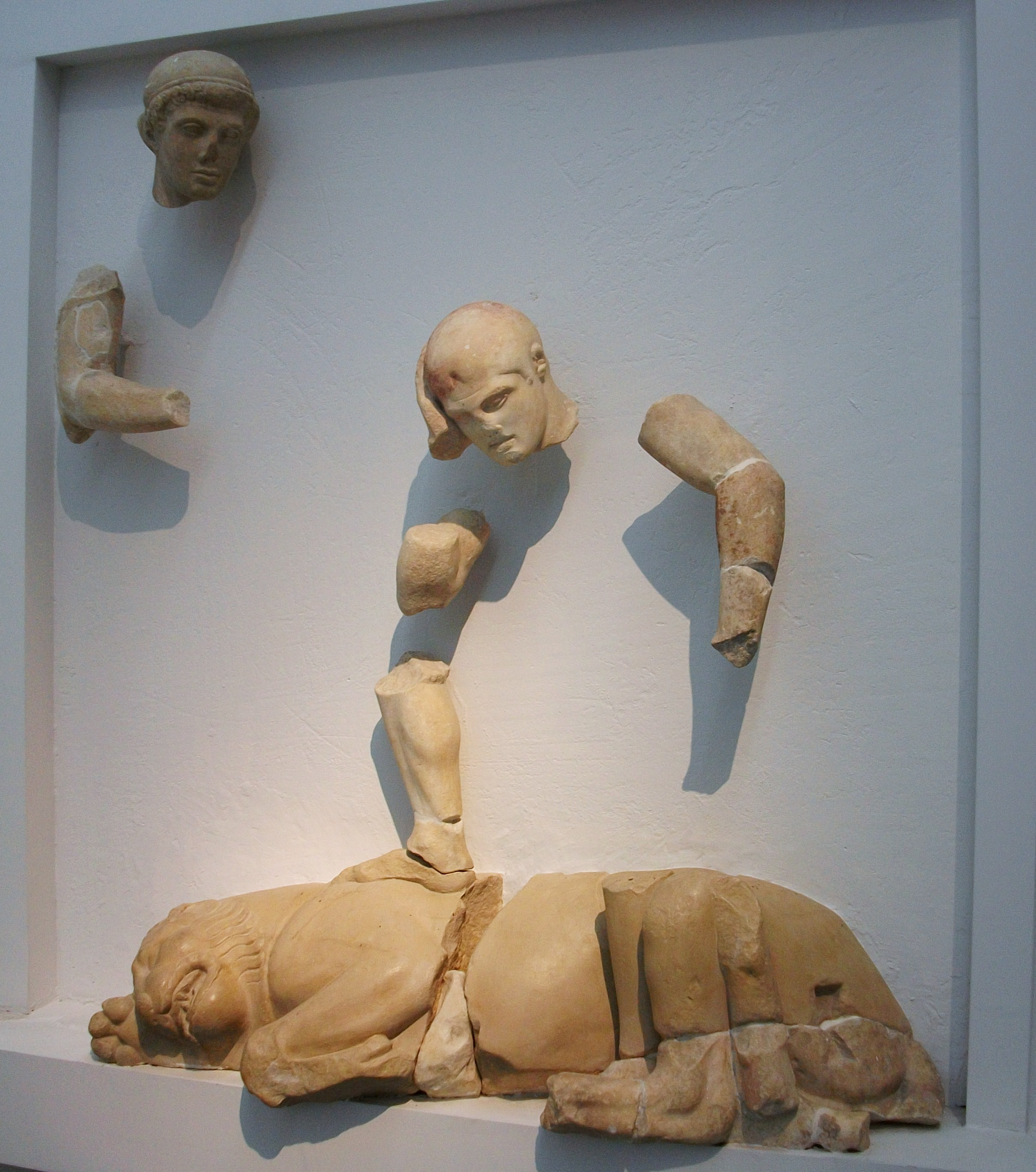
Temple of Zeus at Olympia metope 1, c. 470–456 BC; Archaeological Museum of Olympia

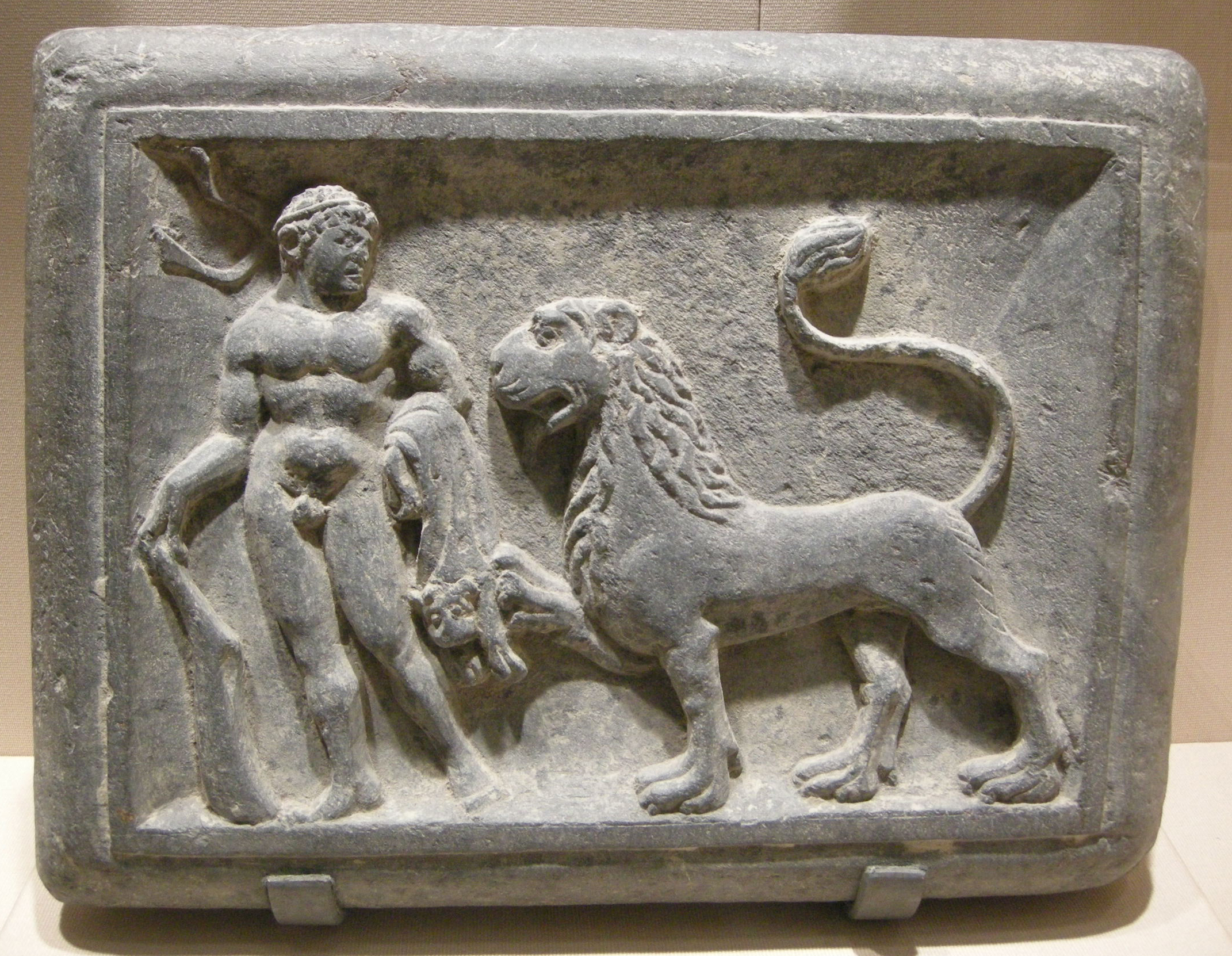
Gandharan relief, 1st century; Metropolitan Museum, New York City

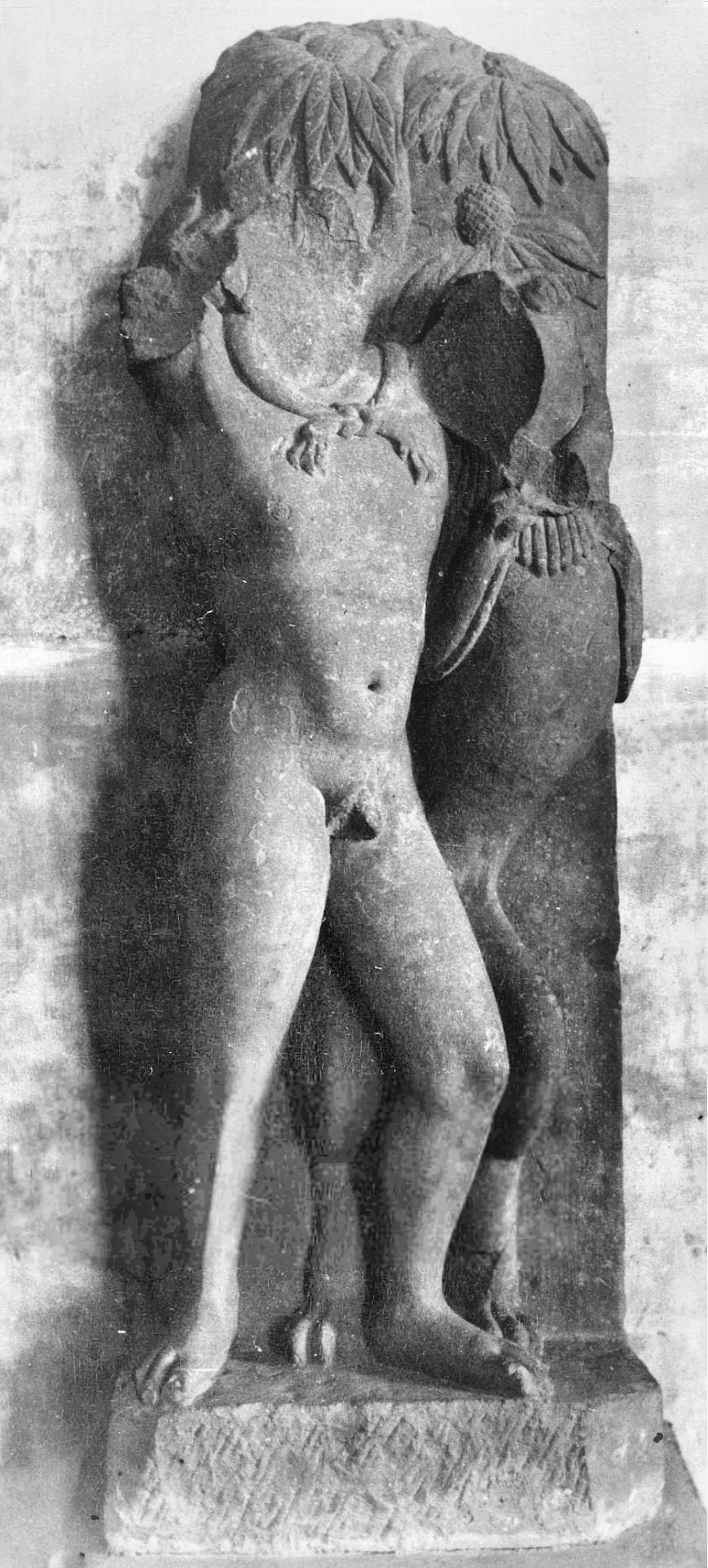
The Mathura Herakles, 2nd century; Indian Museum, Kolkata

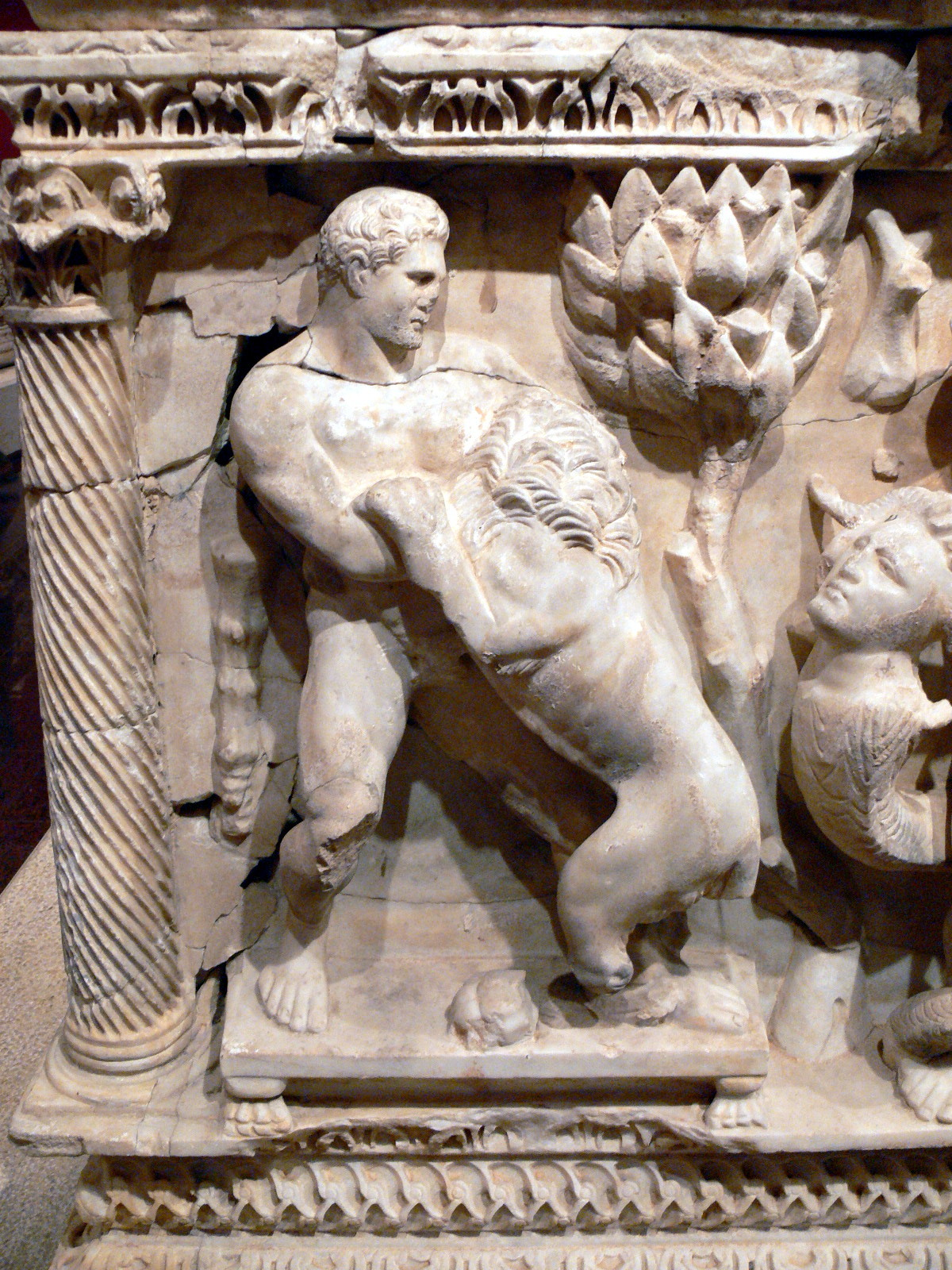
Roman-era relief, 2nd century; Antalya Museum

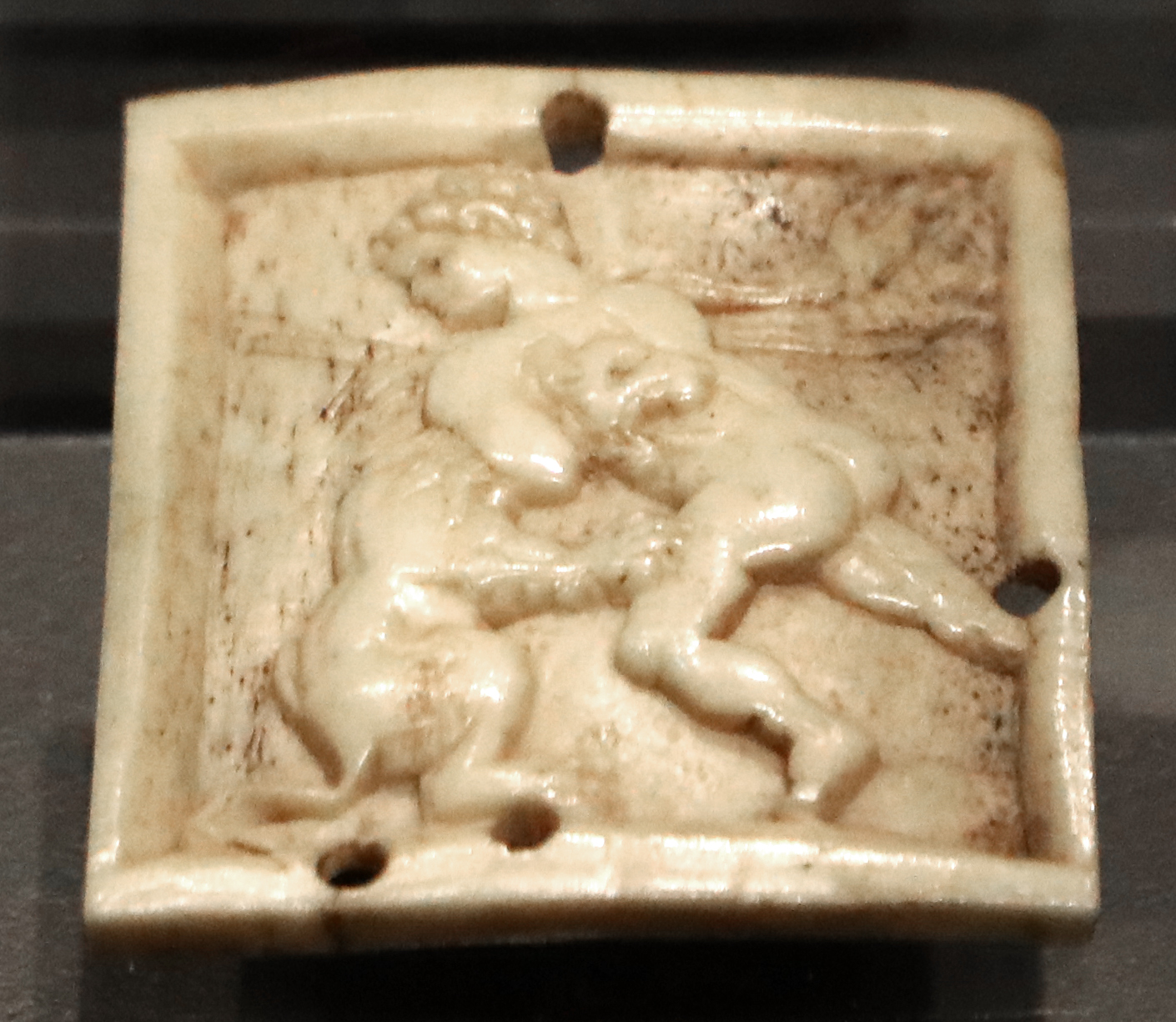
Byzantine ivory, c. 950–1000; Museo del Bargello, Florence

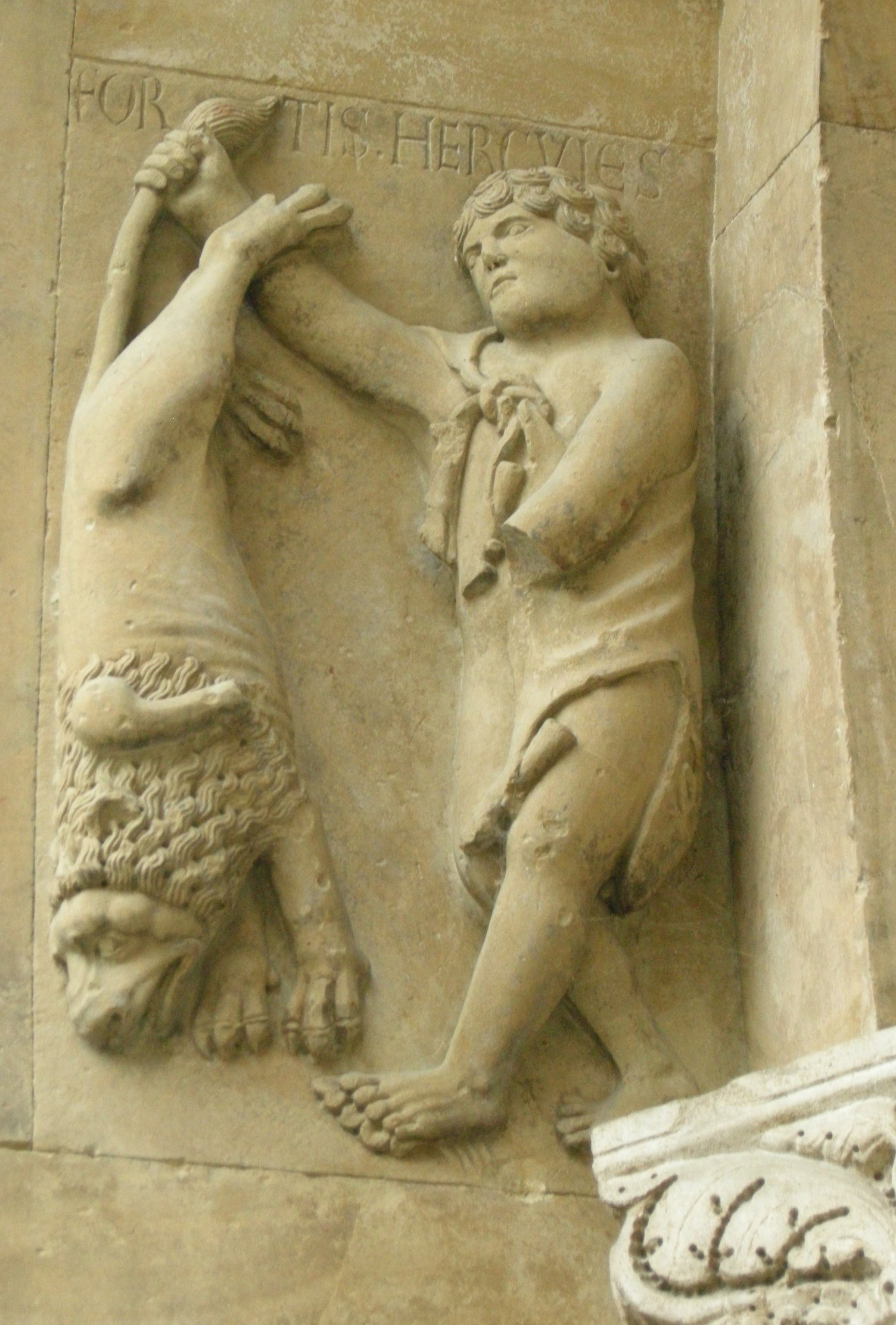
Late 12th-century romanesque relief by Benedetto Antelami on the right portal of Fidenza Cathedral

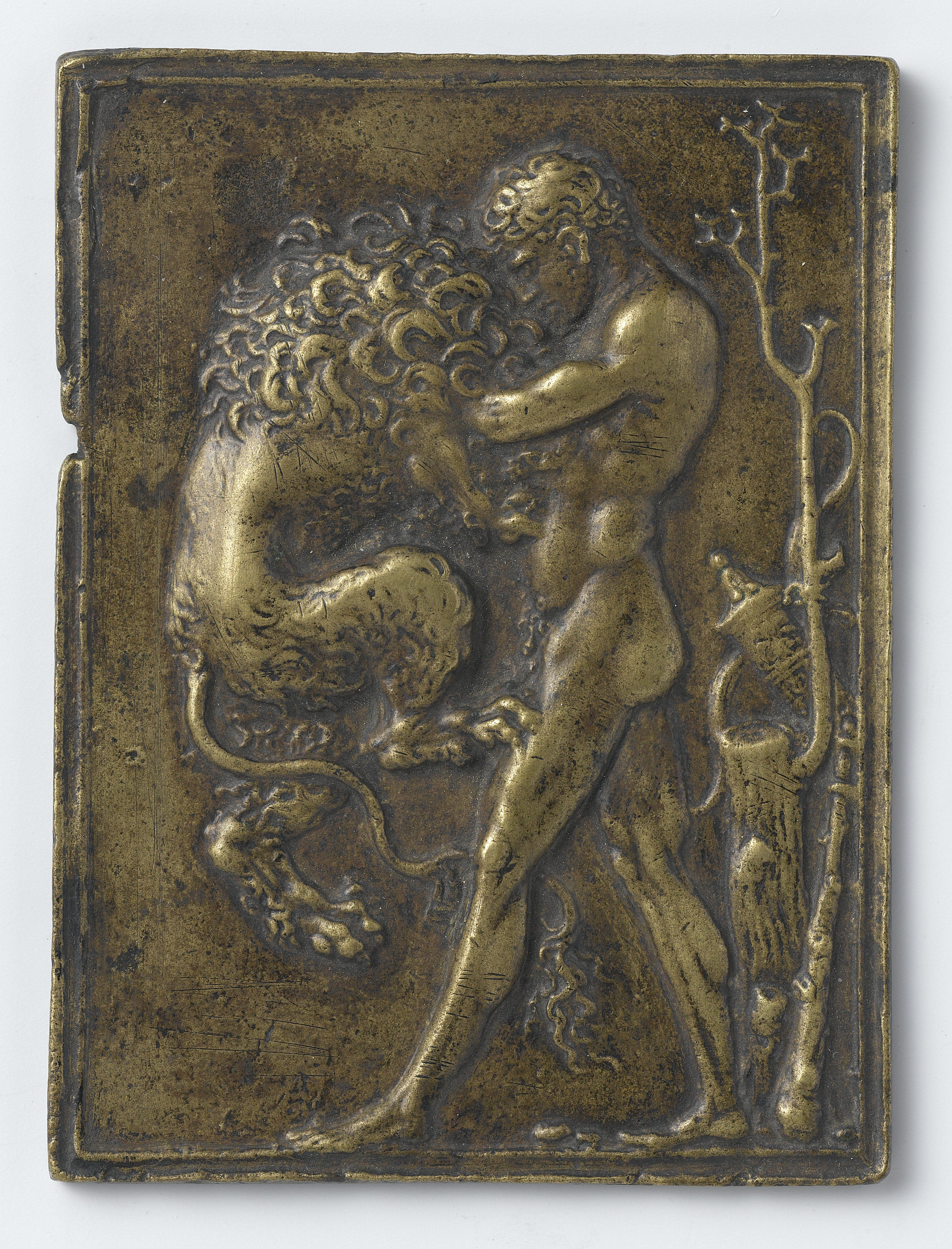
Plaque, c. 1500–25 by Galeazzo Mondella

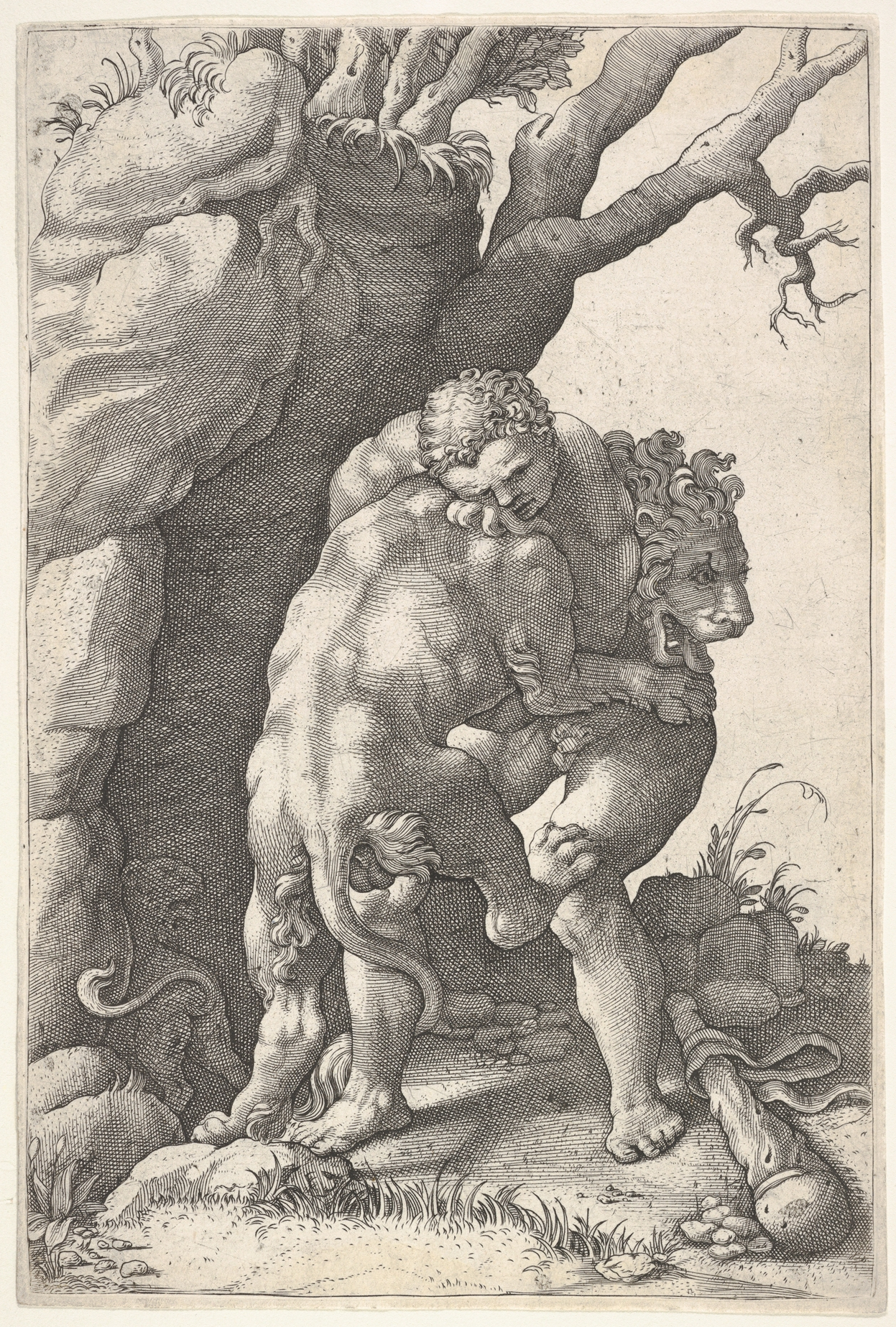
Engraving, c. 1530–87, by Adamo Scultori and Giulio Romano; Metropolitan Museum of Art

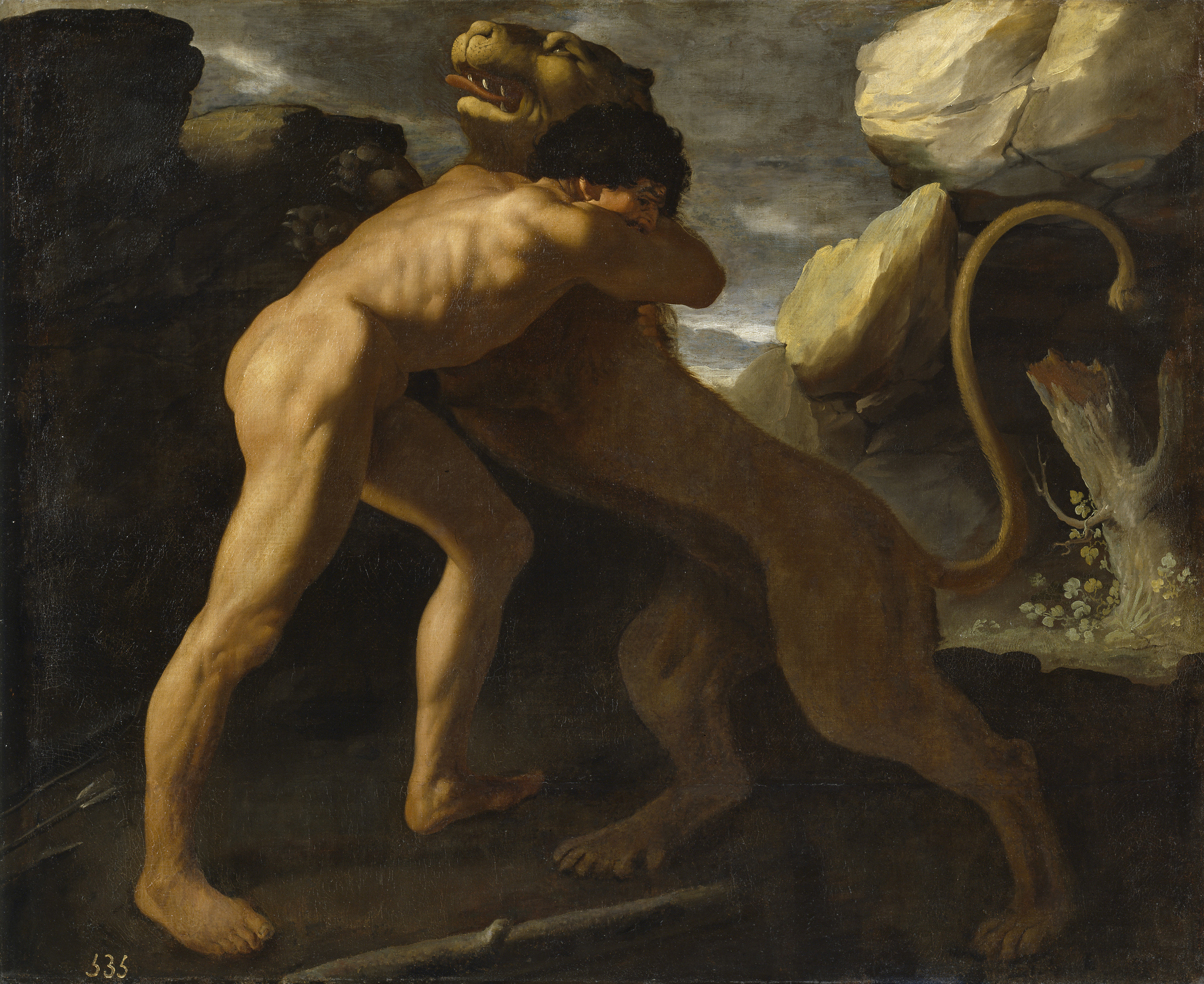
Painting by Francisco de Zurbarán (1634); Prado Museum, Madrid

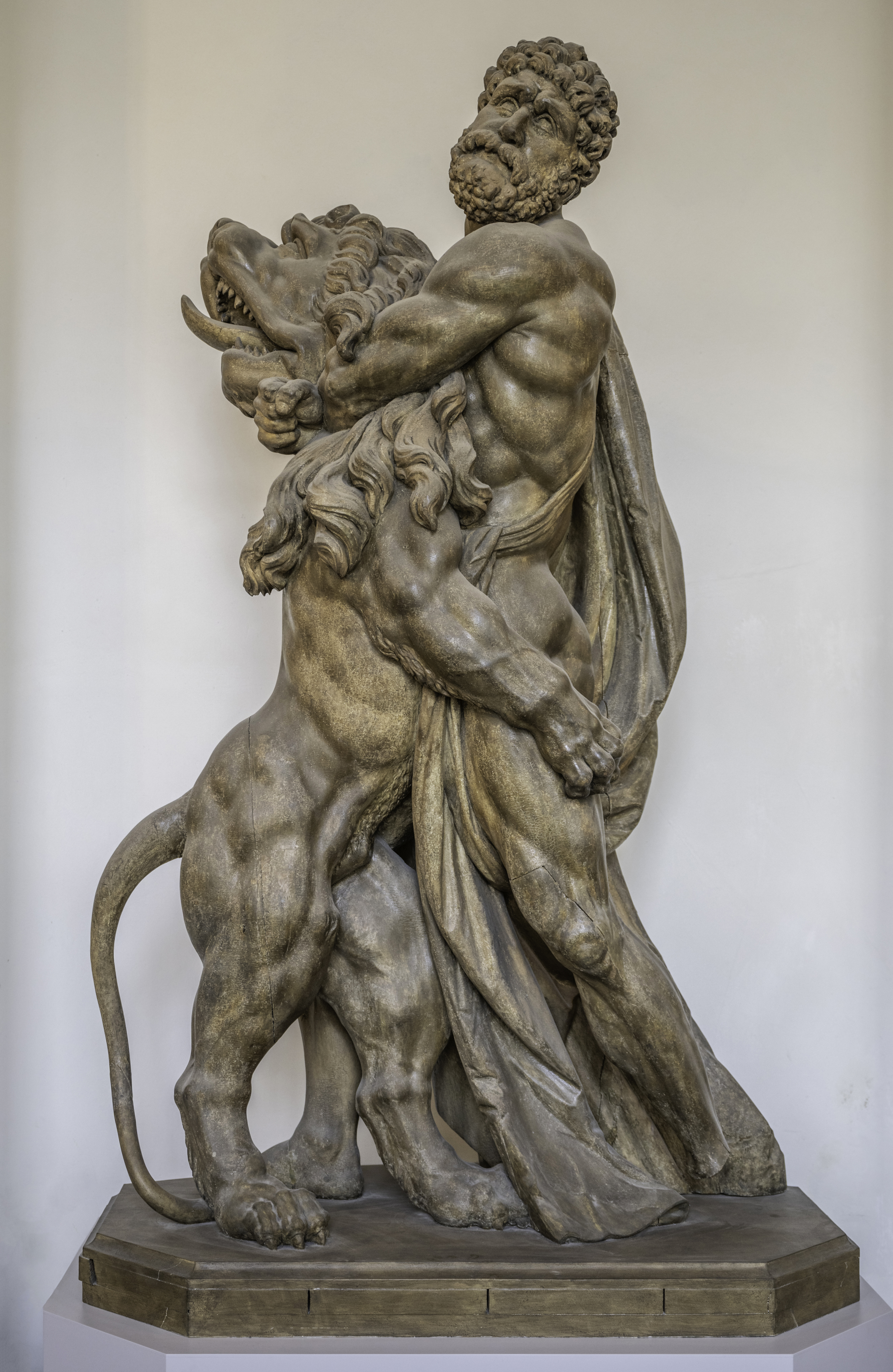
17th-century marble; Munich Residenz

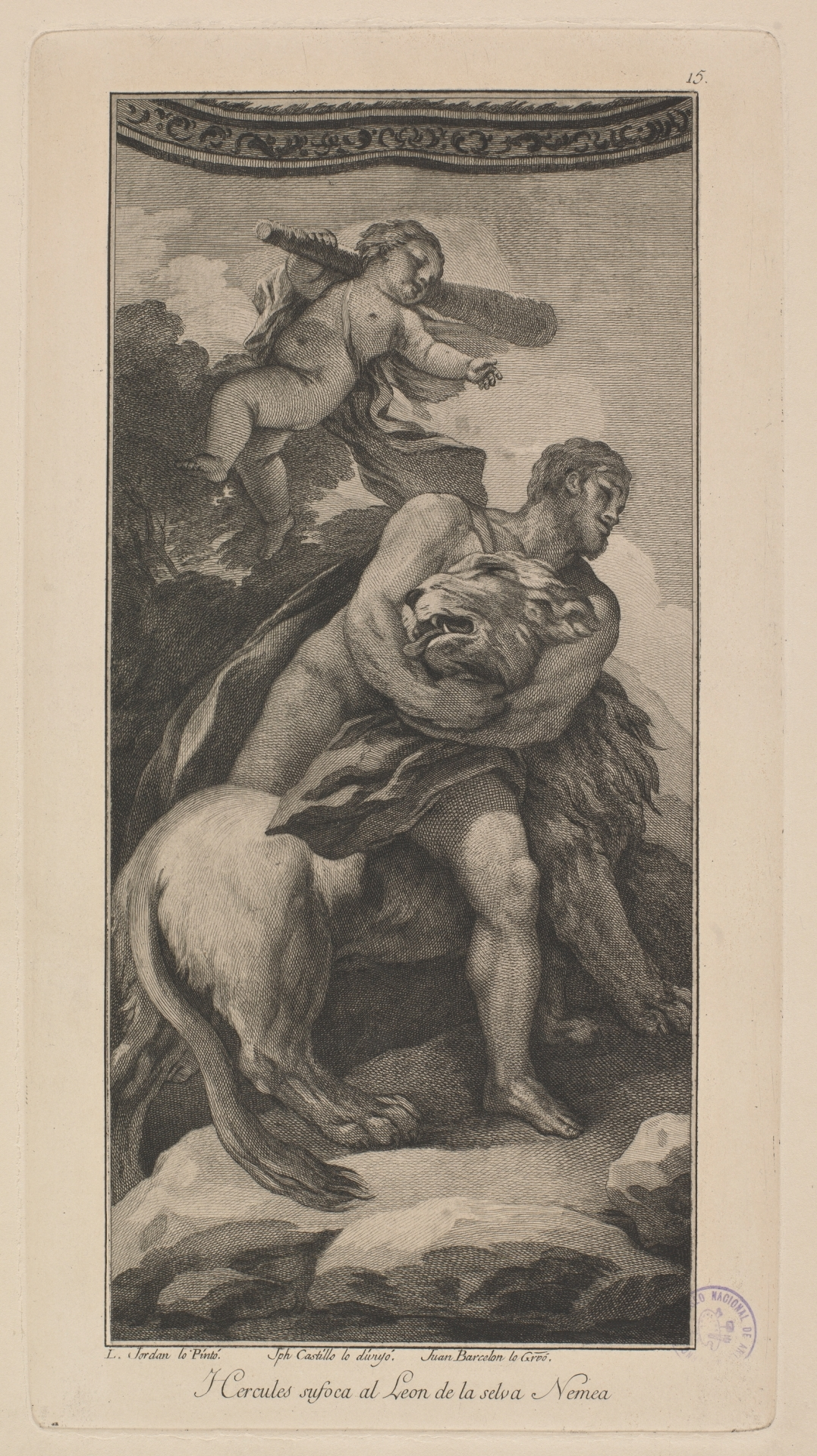
Engraving, c. 1777–85 by Juan Barcelón y Abellán

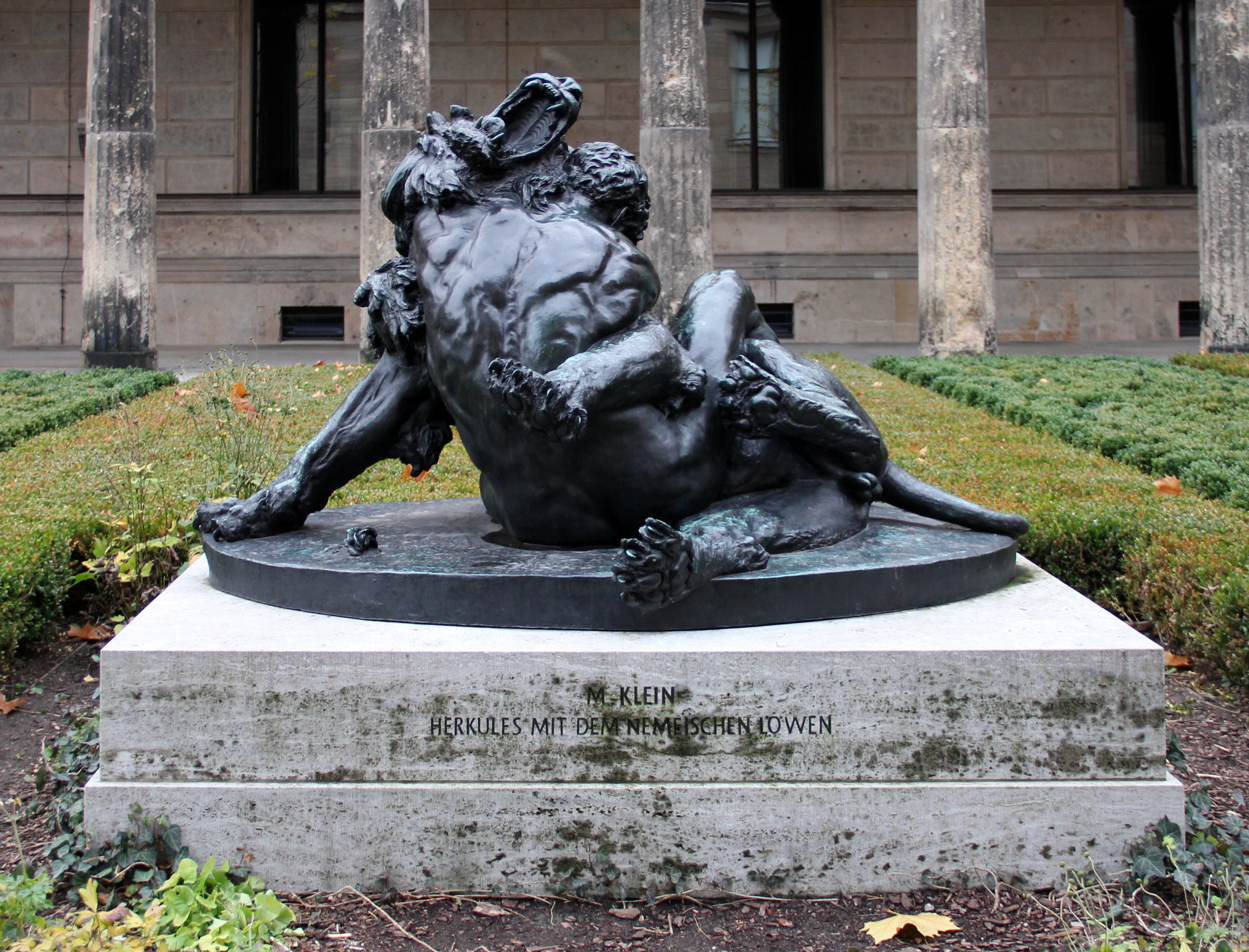
1879 bronze sculpture by Max Klein outside the Alte Nationalgalerie, Berlin

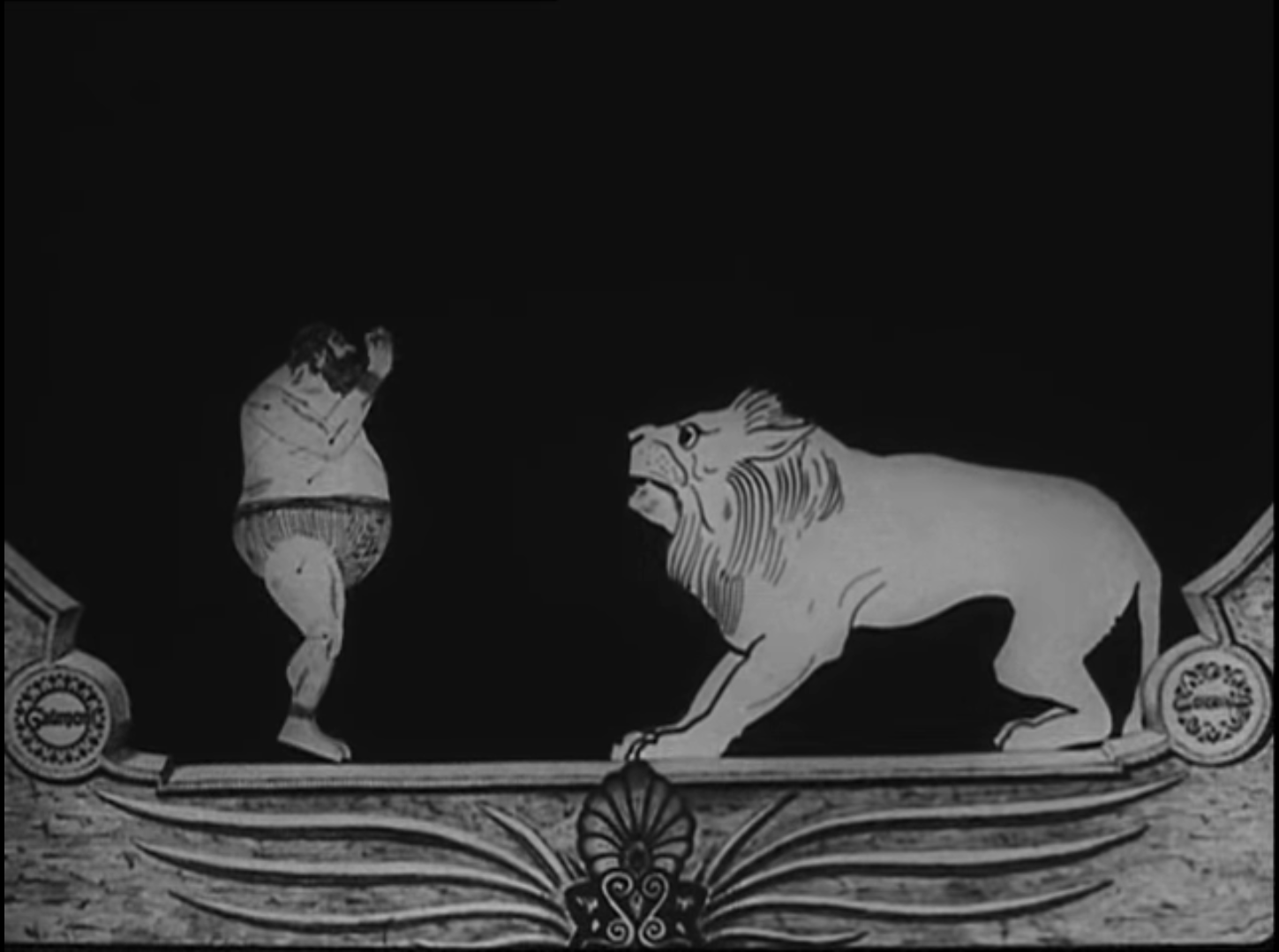
Still from Émile Cohl's 1910 animated cartoon Les Douze Travaux d'Hercule

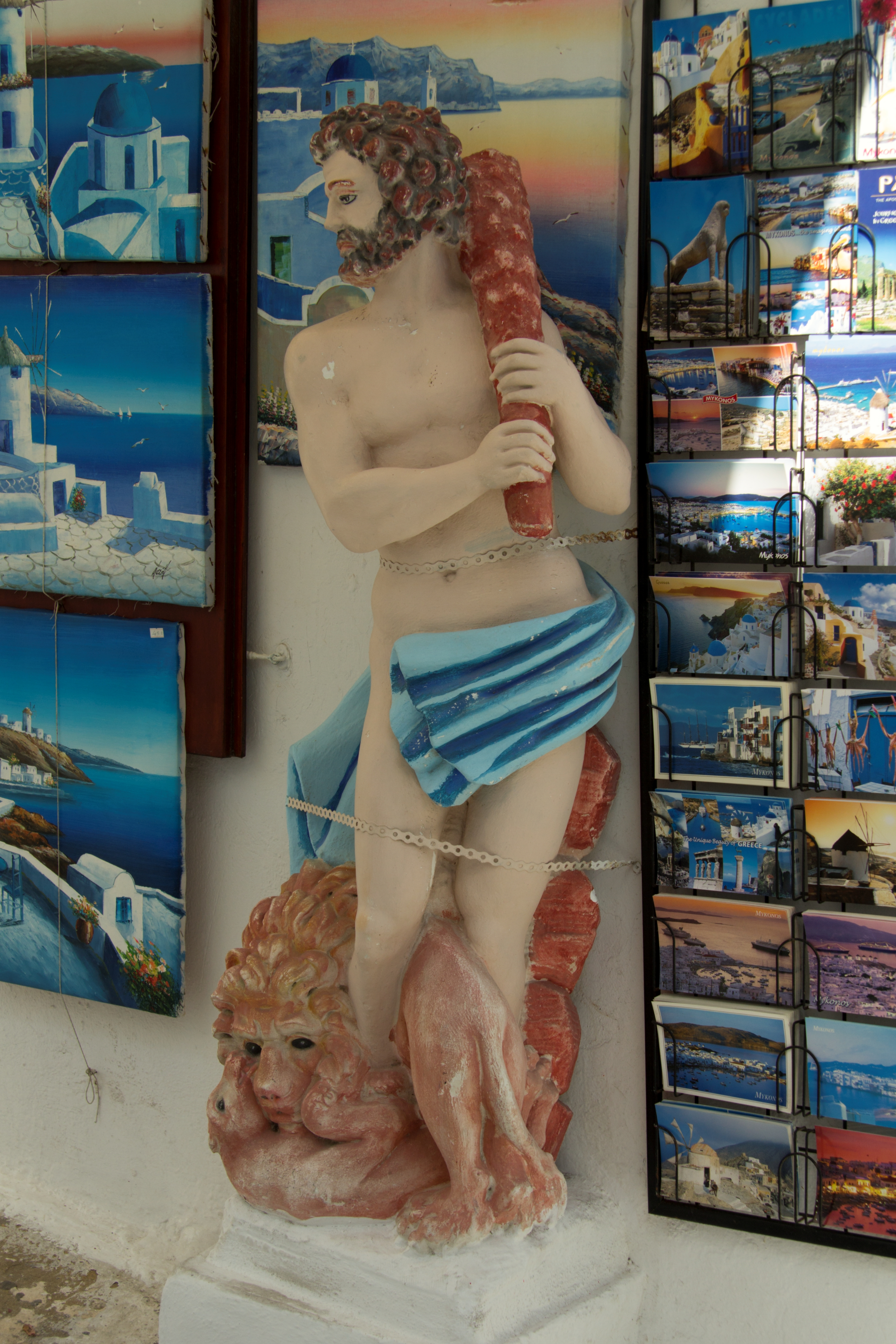
21st-century sculpture in a gift shop in Mykonos

== See also ==
- History of lions in Europe
- List of mythological lions
- Lion of Cithaeron
- Kangla Sha
- Nongshaba
- Tsavo Man-Eaters
- Mfuwe man-eating lion
- Panthera spelaea
- Smilodon
- Leo (astrology)
- Master of Animals
- Irresistible force paradox
