= Papyrus Oxyrhynchus 466 =

Greek papyrus fragment

Papyrus Oxyrhynchus III 466 (P. Oxy. III,466) is a fragmentary 2nd century Greek papyrus manuscript containing instructions for wrestling, including the description of various grips and holds, constituting the earliest historical European martial arts manual along with P.Oxy LXXIX 5204 (instructions for pankration). The papyrus was given to Columbia University by the Egypt Exploration Society in 1907.

The text is in three columns with 13, 15 and 10 lines, respectively. Each instruction is followed by plexon (πλέξον) "tangle", translated by Miller (2004) as "mix it up!" (in the sense of "execute!"). Poliakoff (1987) translates "you fight it out".

== See also ==
- Oxyrhynchus Papyri
- Greek wrestling
