= Hyperdexion =

Hyperdexion (Ancient Greek: τὸ Ὑπερδέξιον) was a village of ancient Lesbos. This village provided epithets for Zeus Hyperdexios and Athena Hyperdexia.

The site of Hyperdexion is unlocated.
