= Apomyius =

Epithet of Zeus at Olympia

Apomyius (Ancient Greek: Ἀπόμυιος, lit. 'driving away the flies') was an epithet of Zeus at Olympia. On one occasion, when Heracles was offering a sacrifice to Zeus at Olympia, he was annoyed by hosts of flies, and in order to get rid of them, he offered a sacrifice to Zeus Apomyius, whereupon the flies withdrew across the river Alpheius. From that time the Eleans sacrificed to Zeus under this name.

According to a fragment of Antiphanes, during the festival which included the ancient Olympic Games, the sacrifice of an ox was performed to prevent the flies from encroaching upon the site. Aelian writes in his De Natura Animalium, though, that the flies did not come across to Olympia's side of the Alfeios river, even if a sacrifice had not been performed.
