= Apesantius =

Epithet of Zeus from Nemea

Apesantius (Ancient Greek: Ἀπεσάντιος) was an epithet and toponymic surname of the god Zeus from Greek mythology, under which he had a temple on Mount Apesas (modern Mount Phoukas) near Nemea, where Perseus was said to have first offered sacrifices to him.
