= Aetnaeus =

Ancient Roman and Greek mythological epithet

Aetnaeus (Ancient Greek: Αἰτναῖος) was an epithet given to several Greek and Roman gods and mythical beings connected with Mount Aetna, such as Zeus, of whom there was a statue on Mount Aetna, and to whom a festival was celebrated there, called Aetnaea (τὰ Αἴτναια), Hephaestus, who had his workshop in the mountain, and a temple near it, and the Cyclops.
