= Agetor =

Ancient Greek mythological epithet

Agetor (Ancient Greek: Ἀγήτωρ), alternatively spelled Hegetor (Hγήτωρ means "leader, ruler') was an epithet given to several gods of Greek mythology, primarily Zeus in the region of Lacedaemon. The name probably describes Zeus as the ruler of gods, humankind, and the universe in general. Agetor was also an epithet of Apollo. Finally, it was also an epithet applied to Hermes, who conducts the souls of men to the lower world. Under this name Hermes had a statue at Megalopolis.
