= Juan Barcelón y Abellán =

- Hercules descends into the underworld to bring back Alcestis, engraving by Barcelón y Abellán and Nicolás Barsanti after Luca Giordano's frescoes in the Casón del Buen Retiro c. 1777
- Born: Juan José Ramón Paulino Barcelón y Abellán; 30 June 1739; Lorca, (Spain)
- Died: 19 October 1801 (aged 62); Madrid, (Spain)
- Education: Royal Academy of Fine Arts of San Fernando
- Occupation: Engraver
- Movement: Baroque

Juan Barcelón y Abellán (30 June 1739 – 19 October 1801) was a Spanish Baroque engraver.

== Biography ==
The son of Antonio Barcelón, a brass founder, and María Abellán, he was baptised at the parish Church of Santiago in Lorca. As a young man, he was sent to Murcia to study under a relative. In Murcia, he became interested in drawing and studied in the workshop of Francisco Salzillo. In 1759, he enrolled as a painting student at the Royal Academy of Fine Arts of San Fernando in Madrid. He studied under Juan Bernabé Palomino, who encouraged him to specialise in copperplate engraving. In 1762, he was awarded a four-year scholarship to further develop his skills. In 1763, he won the Academy's top prize in the engraving category and became an assistant to his teacher. Finally, in 1777, he was admitted as an académico de mérito (honorary academician). He died in Madrid on 19 October 1801, aged 62.

== Work ==
In his Viaje de España (Journey Through Spain, 1776), Antonio Ponz highlighted the importance of Luca Giordano's frescoes in the Casón del Buen Retiro, while warning of the building’s deteriorating condition and the dampness affecting it. He advocated for their preservation and suggested that they be made more widely accessible through engravings. Following Ponz’s suggestion, on 6 August 1777, the Madrid-born painter José del Castillo was commissioned to restore and copy Giordano's works. Between 1777 and 1785, Barcelón y Abellán and Nicolás Barsanti produced a series of engravings based on Castillo's oil copies. It was the first attempt in Spain to reproduce and disseminate paintings from the royal collection through print.

In 1789 Barsanti and Barcelón y Abellán established the Compañía para el grabado de los cuadros de los Reales Palacios (Company for the Engraving of the Paintings of the Royal Palacios). The company was formed as a joint-stock enterprise to reproduce and distribute copperplate engravings of the paintings housed within the Spanish royal collection. For the company the two artists produced engravings based on Giulio Romano's Holy Family and Jusepe de Ribera's Portrait of Maddalena Venturi degli Abruzzi with Her Husband and Son. Alongside other engravers, Barcelón y Abellán contributed illustrations to the Ibarra edition of Don Quixote (1780), sponsored by the Royal Spanish Academy; the Arab Antiquities of Spain (1787); the series Portraits of Illustrious Spaniards (1791–1796); José Moreno’s Viage á Constantinopla, en el año de 1784 (Royal Printing House, 1790); and Nuevas indagaciones acerca de las fracturas de la rótula y de las enfermedades que con ella tienen relación, principalmente con la transversal (1795), a medical text by the Catalan physician Leonardo Galli.

Drawing upon the 1650 Paris edition of Jusepe de Ribera’s works, which had been reproduced as etchings by Louis Ferdinand Elle, Barcelón y Abellán compiled a drawing manual titled Cartilla para aprender a dibuxar, published in 1772 by Antonio del Castillo. Barcelón y Abellán is also responsible for the engravings that illustrate Leonardo da Vinci's Treatise on Painting, as well as Leon Battista Alberti's Della Pittura, translated and annotated by Diego Antonio Rejón de Silva and published by the Royal Printing House in 1784. In addition to book illustrations, which form the majority of his body of work, Barcelón y Abellán realized some individual devotional prints, such as an etching and engraving of the Trinity produced in 1772 for Friar Gaspar de Rojas and dedicated to the Bishop of Segorbe, Alonso Cano.

== Gallery ==
Holy Family, engraved by Juan Barcelón y Abellán after the painting attributed to Giulio Romano housed in the Royal Palace of Madrid

A Jester, engraving from Barcelón y Abellán's Cartilla para aprender a dibuxar, Madrid, 1772

Allegories of Fortitude and Temperance, c. 1777. Engraving by Barcelón y Abellán after one of the frescoes by Luca Giordano in the west vestibule of the Casón del Buen Retiro in Madrid

Allegory of America, c. 1777. Engraving by Barcelón y Abellán after one of the frescoes by Luca Giordano in the west vestibule of the Casón del Buen Retiro in Madrid

== Bibliography ==
- Juan Carrete Parrondo; Fernando Checa Cremades; Valeriano Bozal, eds. (1988). Summa Artis. Historia general del arte (in Spanish). Vol. XXXI: El grabado en España (siglo XV al XVIII). Madrid: Espas Calpe. ISBN 84-239-5273-8.
- Catálogo general de la Calcografía Nacional (in Spanish). Madrid: Real Academia de Bellas Artes de San Fernando. 1987. ISBN 84-86630-10-X.
- María Luisa Cuenca; Ana Hernández Pugh; José Manuel Matilla, eds. (2019). El maestro de papel. Cartillas para aprender a dibujar de los siglos XVII al XIX (in Spanish). Madrid: Museo Nacional del Prado, Centro de Estudios Europa Hispánica. ISBN 978-8415245865.
- Manuel Ruiz Ortega, ed. (1990). Cartilla para aprender a dibuxar sacada por las obras de Joseph de Rivera, llamado (bulgarmete) el Españoleto (in Spanish). Barcelona: Universitat de Barcelona, Publicacions. ISBN 84-7875-041-X.
