= Asbamaeus =

Cultic epithet of the Greek God Zeus

Asbamaeus (Ancient Greek: Ἀσβαμαῖος) was an epithet of the Greek god Zeus, in his persona as the protector of the sanctity of oaths.

The name was derived from a well, Asbamaeon, near Tyana, in Cappadocia, and indeed the cult of Asbamaeus was central to the identity of Tyana. There was said to be a great temple to Asbamaeon in the city. Some ancient sources describe the mythical Asbamaeus as being the father of some of the city's prominent residents, such as Apollonius of Tyana.

The water of this well was said to be beneficial and pleasant to honest people, but pestilential to those who were guilty of perjury. When perjured persons drank of the water, it was said to produce a disease of the eyes, edema, and other forms of physical disability, so that the guilty person would be unable to walk away from the well, and were obliged to admit their crime. The well itself does not survive, but writers in the 19th century reported seeing a brackish pool, 30 to 40 feet in diameter, that was believed to be its remnants, and where travelers were still said to seek out to be cured of skin diseases.

There are inscriptions mentioning this epithet in other sites in Asia Minor, such as in Amastris in Paphlagonia. Some scholars surmise that Asbamaeus was the name of a local god of Asia Minor later identified with Zeus.
