= Apemius =

Epithet of the god Zeus in Greek mythology

Apemius (Ancient Greek: Ἀπήμιος) or Apemios was an epithet of the god Zeus in Greek mythology, which meant "averter of ills". Under this name Zeus had an altar on Mount Parnes in Attica, on which sacrifices were offered to him.

There is also a mountain at Hymettus with shrines to Zeus that some scholars considered to be connected to his worship as Apemius.
