= Battle of the 300 Champions =

Battle between Argos and Sparta

Battle of the Champions
Date	546 BC
Location	Thyrea, Greece
Result	Indecisive

Belligerents
Sparta	Argos

Strength
300 hoplites	300 hoplites

Casualties and losses
299 dead and 1 injured	298 men dead

The Battle of the 300 Champions, known since Herodotus' day as the Battle of the Champions, was fought in roughly 546 BC between Argos and Sparta. Rather than commit full armies both sides agreed to pitting 300 of their best men against each other.

== Herodotus ==
According to Herodotus Sparta had surrounded and captured the plain of Thyrea. When the Argives marched out to defend it, the two armies agreed to let 300 champions from each city fight, with the winner taking the territory. Presumably the idea was to reduce the total number of casualties. Both armies marched home, so as to prevent either side from helping their champions and escalating the duel into a full battle.

Neither side would allow for any injured men to be taken. The day called for complete destruction of the enemy force for victory. The two armies were evenly matched and neither could gain the upper hand. They fought until nightfall, and after a bloody battle only three men remained, two Argives and one Spartan. The Argives, Alcenor (Ἀλκήνωρ) and Chromius (Χρομίος), believing that they had killed all of the Spartans, left the battlefield racing home to Argos to announce their victory. However, they had made one mistake: Othryades, an injured Spartan, had survived. As he was technically the last man standing on the battlefield from either army, he too claimed victory. He survived long enough to tell his baggage handlers of this, and then he committed suicide. By tradition, Othryades was ashamed to be the only man in his unit to live, and so he killed himself on the field of battle rather than return to Sparta. The reason for the suicide is up for debate, but the act is of great importance. Othryades did not die by an Argive sword, and the Spartans could always claim that he survived the battle and killed himself in shame, thus gaining an upper hand due to this act of honor.

Both sides were able to claim victory: the Argives because more of their champions had survived, and the Spartans because their single champion held the field. Argos did not take too kindly to the Spartans claiming victory and sent their entire hoplite army which was met by a Spartan force of equal size. The Spartans won a decisive victory and as a result gained control of Thyreatis.

== Plutarch ==
=== Parallel Lives ===
Plutarch writes in the Parallel Lives that according to Chrysermus (Χρύσερμος) third book of the "Peloponnesian History", there was a dispute between the Argives and the Lacedemonians (Spartans) about the possession of Thyrea. The Amphictyons said that 300 of each side will fight and the victor will take the land. The Lacedemonians chose Othryades as their captain, and the Argives the Thersander (Θέρσανδρος). The battle was fought, and two Argive hoplites, Agenor (Ἀγήνωρ) and Chromius (Χρόμιος), seemed to be the only survivors. They left the battlefield and went to their city in order to inform their co-citizens about the victory. But in the meantime, Othryades who was not yet dead but heavily injured, raised himself by the help of broken spears. He gathered the shields of the dead, and erected a trophy. He wrote on the trophy with his own blood "To Zeus the Guardian of Trophies" (Διὶ τροπαιούχῳ). Because it was not clear who was victorious, the Amphictyons had to decide and after a personal inspection of the battlefield, gave victory to the Lacedemonians.

=== "On the Malice of Herodotus" ===
Plutarch in "On the Malice of Herodotus" supports Herodotus’ account that Othryades was the only survivor of the Spartan champions, but because he was ashamed to return to Sparta, he killed himself on the spot at Thyrea.

== Pausanias ==
Pausanias adds that the battle was foretold by the Sibyl, and that the Argives considered themselves the victors and dedicated a bronze sculpture of the Trojan horse at Delphi to commemorate the victory. However, Pausanias says that the sculptor of this horse was Antiphanes of Argos, who dates to ca. 400 BC. Therefore, either Pausanias is mistaken, or he confused this with a battle at Thyrea in 424 BC.

== Lucian ==
In the Lucian's "Charon or Inspectors", the god Hermes says to the Charon that the general who lies there half-dead, writing an inscription on the trophy with his own blood, is Othryades.

== Ovid ==
Ovid write in his poem Fasti that if the god Terminus had marked the borders of the Thyrean land, the men would not have died and the name of Othryades would not been read on the piled arms.

== Suda ==
The account in the 10th-century Byzantine encyclopedia Suda says that after the men fought, Othryades (whom the Suda calls Othryadas) remained unnoticed among the corpses, heavily wounded. When the Argive survivors Alkenor and Chromios left, he managed to strip the Argive corpses, raise a trophy and write on it with human blood and because of this the Spartans won the dispute. Suda also mentioned that after he raised the trophy, he immediately died.

== Greek Anthology ==
In the Greek Anthology there are some poems dedicated to the battle and the soldiers who participated.

== Aftermath ==
Years later, in 420 BC during a lull in the Peloponnesian War, Argos challenged Sparta to a rematch of the Battle of the 300 Champions. Sparta declined.

== Notes ==
1. Paul Cartledge, "The Spartans: The World of the Warrior-Heroes of Ancient Greece", pp. 87–88.
2. Ancient Greek battles, Battle of Champions
