= Othryades =

Legendary Spartan warrior

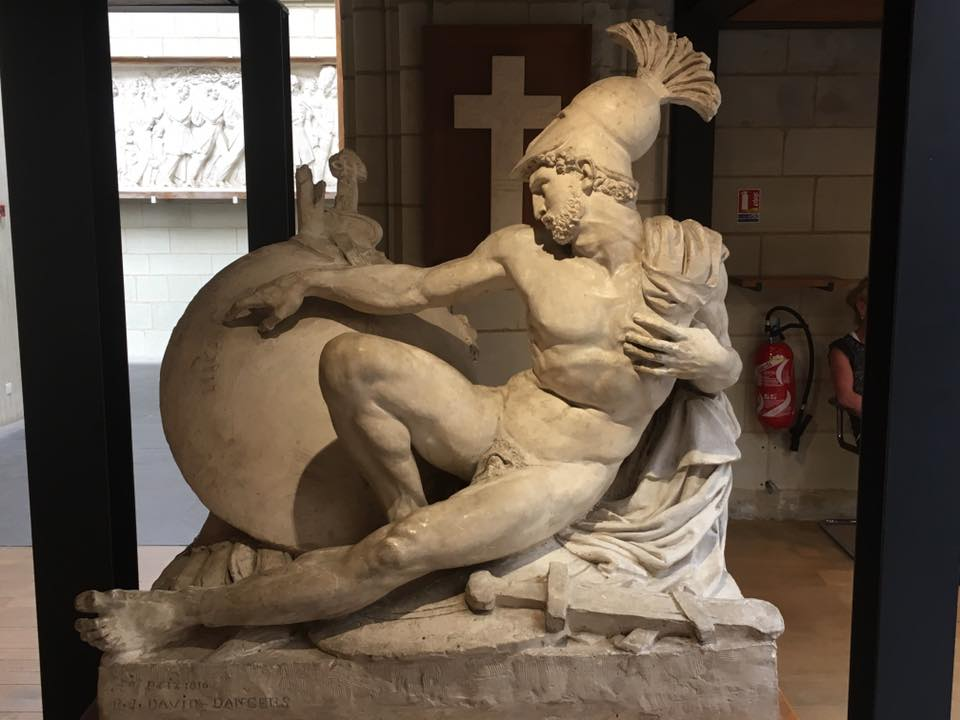
- Othryades depicted in an 1810 sculpture
- Native name: Ὀθρυάδης and Ὀθρυάδας
- Allegiance: Sparta
- Battles / wars: Battle of the 300 Champions

Othryades (Ancient Greek: Ὀθρυάδης) and Othryadas (Ancient Greek: Ὀθρυάδας) was the last surviving Spartan of the 300 Spartans selected to fight against 300 Argives in the Battle of the 300 Champions. Ashamed by surviving his comrades, he committed suicide on the field following the battle.

== Biography ==
The Spartans and Argives were fighting for possession of Thyrea. Rather than commit their entire armies to the field, the Spartans and Argives agreed that the battle would be fought by 300 soldiers from each side, and whichever side won would possess the land. Othryades was one of 300 Spartan soldiers selected to fight the 300 Argive soldiers. The two main armies withdrew to their own territories before the battle commenced, because if the armies remained their soldiers might lend aid to their comrades if they saw them losing.

Neither side could gain an advantage in the battle and, in the end, only three soldiers of the 600 survived the battle: Orthyades, for the Spartans, and Alcenor and Chromius, for the Argives. After the battle, the two surviving Argives left the field to report their victory. Orthyades, on the other hand, remained and looted the bodies of the fallen Argives (as was customary).

The following day, the Spartan and Argive army returned to see who had been victorious, but each side claimed victory: the Argives because more Argives had survived and the Spartans because the Argives had retreated. The disagreement resulted in general fighting between the armies and in which the Spartans were the victors. Othryades, ashamed to return to Sparta as the sole survivor of the 300, committed suicide on the battlefield.

== In art ==
- Othryades the Spartan, Dying, is a sculpture by Johan Tobias Sergel in the Louvre's Northern European Sculpture Collection.
- Dying Othryades is a sculpture by David d'Angers at the Musée des Beaux-Arts d'Angers.

== In literature ==
- Ovid mentions Othryades in Fasti II.663.
- In the Greek Anthology there are some poems dedicated to the battle and to the Othryades.
