= Chilon of Patras =

Chilon of Patras (Ancient Greek: Χείλων Πατρεύς) was a wrestler from Patras, Achaea, son of Chilon. He won at wrestling in the 112th and the 113th Olympic Games, four times in Isthmia, three in Nemea and two times at Pythia. He was killed in a battle, according to Pausanias either at Chaeronea or at Lamia. The statue of Chilon at Olympia was made by Lysippus.

One hypothesis suggests that Lysippus' Apoxyomenos could represent Chilon and that its fate would have been the one described by Pliny the Elder in his Natural History (XXXIV, 62) : the bronze statue was moved from Olympia to Rome, and Agrippa had it erected in front of the baths. Tiberius moved it back to its original place after popular demand.
