= Agonius =

Ancient Greek mythological epithet

Agonius (Ancient Greek: Ἀγώνιος) or Enagonius (Εναγώνιος) was an epithet of several gods in Greek mythology (or a distinct deity). Aeschylus and Sophocles use it of Apollo and Zeus, and apparently in the sense of helpers in struggles and contests, or possibly as the protectors of soldiers. But Agonius is more especially used as an epithet of Hermes, who presides over all kinds of solemn contests (ἀγῶνες), such as the Agonalia. Classical scholar William Warde Fowler thought it likely the deity or the epithets were merely inventions of the pontifices.

According to a 19th-century catalog of Greek and Roman art in the Vatican Palace, there was in that building a statue considered by the museum's curator to be that of Hermes Enagonius, dated to the time of Lysippos, although other critics have variously believed the statue to depict Heracles, Theseus or Meleager.

"Agonius" was also the original name of the Quirinal Hill in Rome.
