= Mount Phoukas =

Mountain in Greece

Coordinates: 37°51′39″N 22°44′16″E

Mount Phoukas or Foukas (Greek: Φουκάς) is a mountain in the Peloponnesus in Greece. Anciently, it was called Apesas (Ancient Greek: Ἀπέσας; Latin: Apesas mons); it towered above Nemea in the territory of Cleonae, Argolis, and was where Perseus is said to have been the first person who sacrificed to Zeus Apesantius.
