= Sthenia (festival) =

Ancient festival of Zeus

The Sthenia (Ancient Greek: σθένια) was a festival celebrated by the Argives in honor of Zeus Sthenius ("the Strong").

His altar, according to Pausanias, consisted of a large rock situated on the road through the mountains from Troezen to Hermione. This rock was originally known as the altar of Zeus Sthenius, but later became known as the Rock of Theseus, because Theseus took up the sword and sandals of his father, Aegeus, from beneath it.

According to ancient writers the festival included various contests, most notably wrestling which was accompanied by flute music. Plutarch also preserves a tradition that the Sthenia was originally held in honor of Danaus before being consecrated to Zeus Sthenius.
