= Dodone (mythology) =

Figure in Greek Mythology

In Greek mythology, Dodone (Ancient Greek: Δωδώνη, romanized: Dōdṓnē) was said to be one of the Oceanid nymphs (the 3,000 daughters of the Titans Oceanus and Tethys), after whom the ancient city of Dodona was named. The 6th century AD grammarian Stephanus of Byzantium (s.v. Δωδὠνη), writes that according to Thrasyboulos (FHG II 464, a), as reported by Epaphroditus (fr. 57 Braswell–Billerbeck) in his commentary on Callimachus's Aetia (fr. 53 Pfeiffer), the ancient city Dodona was named after an Oceanid nymph named Dodone.

Stephanus further notes that, according to Akestodorus, the city was instead named after Dodon, a son of Zeus and Europa, but concludes that it is more likely that the city was named after the river Dodon, as Herodian says. According to Schol. Iliad 16.233) the city was named after Dodon or Dodone the wife of Deucalion who named the city after her, and according to Eustathius, on Iliad 2.750, the city was named after Dodone, a heroine or Oceanid, or after Dodon.
