= Zanes =

Zanes may refer to:

- Dan Zanes, member of the popular 1980s band The Del Fuegos
- Warren Zanes, American musician and writer
- Zanes of Olympia, bronze statues of Zeus
