= Torrhebia =

Mother of Carius

In Greek mythology, Torrhebia (Ancient Greek: Τορρηβία) was the mother of Carius by Zeus. Her name is connected to Torrhebos, the name of a city in ancient Lydia.
