= Zeus Areius =

Ancient Greek mythological epithet

Areius (Ancient Greek: Ἀρεῖος) was an epithet of the Greek god Zeus. It may mean either "the warlike god" or "the propitiating and atoning god" (as it does for Athena). According to Pausanias, the Eleans believed an altar in Olympia belonged to Zeus Areius, to whom Oenomaus was said to make sacrifices.

A number of coins depicting Zeus Areius survive from the city of Iasos in western Anatolia. Molossian kings made sacrifices to him, and an inscription from Galilee mentions priests of Zeus Areius.

== Olympia ==
According to the Greek author Pausanias (2nd century AD), in the city of Olympia (and next to an altar to the river god Alpheus) there sat an altar to Hephaestus. This altar, he states, was considered by the people of Elis to instead be an altar of Zeus Areius. The people of Elis similarly believe, he says, that the mythical figure Oenomaus, the son of Ares, sacrificed to Zeus Areius whenever he entered into a chariot-driving contest with the suitors of his daughter, Hippodamia.

== Iasos ==
There is evidence of Zeus Areius's veneration in Iasos, a city from the region of Caria in western Anatolia. The name is inscribed upon a number of coins from the city, picturing Zeus holding a shield, as well as his thunderbolt (or a spear), and donned with a helmet.

== Passaron ==
In reality, ancient Greek kings of the Molossians would sacrifice to Areius at the city of Passaron, and exchange oaths with the people over which they ruled: the king swore to uphold the laws, and the people swore to defend the kingdom from threats. If the king failed to live up to this oath, the people would be relieved of their obligations here, and so throughout history we would sometimes see kings removed for this failure.

== Galilee ==
There exists an inscription on a column in Galilee which indicates the column was a gift from persons unknown to the priests of Zeus Areius, which would seem to indicate a significant priesthood in this city at least.
