= Carius =

Son of Zeus in Greek mythology

In Greek mythology, Carius or Karios (Ancient Greek: Κάριος) was the son of Zeus and Torrhebia. His mother's name is connected to Torrhebos, the name of a city in Lydia. According to Hellanicus, there was a mountain named Karios (Carius) near this city, with the sanctuary of Carius situated on it.

== Mythology ==
Nicolaus Damascenus writes that as Carius was wandering by the Torrhebis lake when he heard nymphs singing. These nymphs were also called the Muses by the Lydians. Carius learned music from them, and taught it to the Lydians. This kind of music was known as "Torrhebian songs".

Carius ("of Caria") was also a surname of Zeus himself, under which he was venerated in Mylasa.

== See also ==
- List of Greek deities
