= Colaxes (mythology) =

In Greek mythology, Colaxes or Colaxaïs (Ancient Greek: Κολάξαϊς) was an ancient king of the Scythians, a son of Targitaus, who, according to the Scythian tradition, reigned about 1000 years previous to the expedition of Dareius into Scythia.
