= Eetion (disambiguation) =

Eëtion may refer to:

In Greek mythology:

- Eëtion, king of the Cilician Thebe mentioned in the Iliad
- Eëtion, ruler over the island of Imbros mentioned in the Iliad; he buys Priam's captured son Lycaon and restores him to his father
- Eëtion, a Greek soldier who was killed by Paris

In Greek history:

- Eëtion, the father of Cypselus, the first tyrant of Corinth.

In biology:

- Eetion (skipper), a genus of grass skipper butterflies of the tribe Erionotini
