= Acestodorus =

Ancient Greek historian

Acestodorus (Greek Ἀκεστόδωρος) was a Greek historical writer who is cited by Plutarch, and whose work contained, as it appears, an account of the Battle of Salamis among other things. The time at which he lived is unknown. Stephanus of Byzantium speaks of an Acestodorus of Megalopolis, (= FGrHist 1753) who wrote a work on cities (περὶ πολέων), but whether this is the same as the above-mentioned writer is not clear.
