= List of beauty deities =

A beauty deity is a god or (usually) goddess associated with the concept of beauty. Classic examples in the Western culture are the Greek goddess Aphrodite and her Roman counterpart, Venus. The following is a list of beauty deities across different cultures. For some deities, beauty is only one of several aspects they represent, or a lesser one. Male deities are italicized.

== African ==
=== Akan ===
- Asase Yaa
- Nyankuntom, personification of the rainbow, part of the royal entourage of Nyame or the sun god Awia, usually presented as the son of Awia and Nsuoto, personification of rain.

=== Efik mythology ===
- Anansa

=== Egyptian ===
- Hathor
- Nefertem
- Astarte
- Qetesh

=== Igbo ===
- Nne Uto

=== Yoruba ===
- Oshun

== American ==
=== Aztec ===
- Xochiquetzal

=== Vodou ===
- Erzulie

=== Guarani ===
- Araci
- Caupé

== Asian ==
=== Chinese ===
- Yang Asha

=== Egyptian ===
- Hathor

=== Filipino ===
- Mayari
- Dal'lang

=== Hindu ===
- Rati
- Radha
- Dewi Ratih
- Indrani
- Kartikeya
- Lakshmi
- Parvati
- Saraswati
- Mohini

=== Japanese ===
- Kisshōten

=== Korean ===
- Jacheongbi

=== Mesopotamia ===
- Inanna (also known as Ishtar)
- Astarte

== European ==
=== Albanian ===
- Prende

=== Etruscan ===
- Aplu
- Turan

=== Greek ===
- Adonis (note: a mortal, occasionally depicted as a god)
- Aglaea
- Aphrodite
- Apollo
- Charis
- Charites
- Hebe
- Kale

=== Irish ===
- Clíodhna

=== Norse ===
- Freyja

=== Roman ===
- Apollo
- Venus
- Gratiae, specifically Aglaia

=== Slavic ===
- Lada

=== Welsh ===
- Branwen

== Oceania ==
=== New Zealand / Aotearoa ===
- Tāne

== See also ==
- List of fertility deities
- List of love and lust deities
