= The Three Graces (Canova) =

Canova sculptures in two versions

- Tre Grazie (Italian)
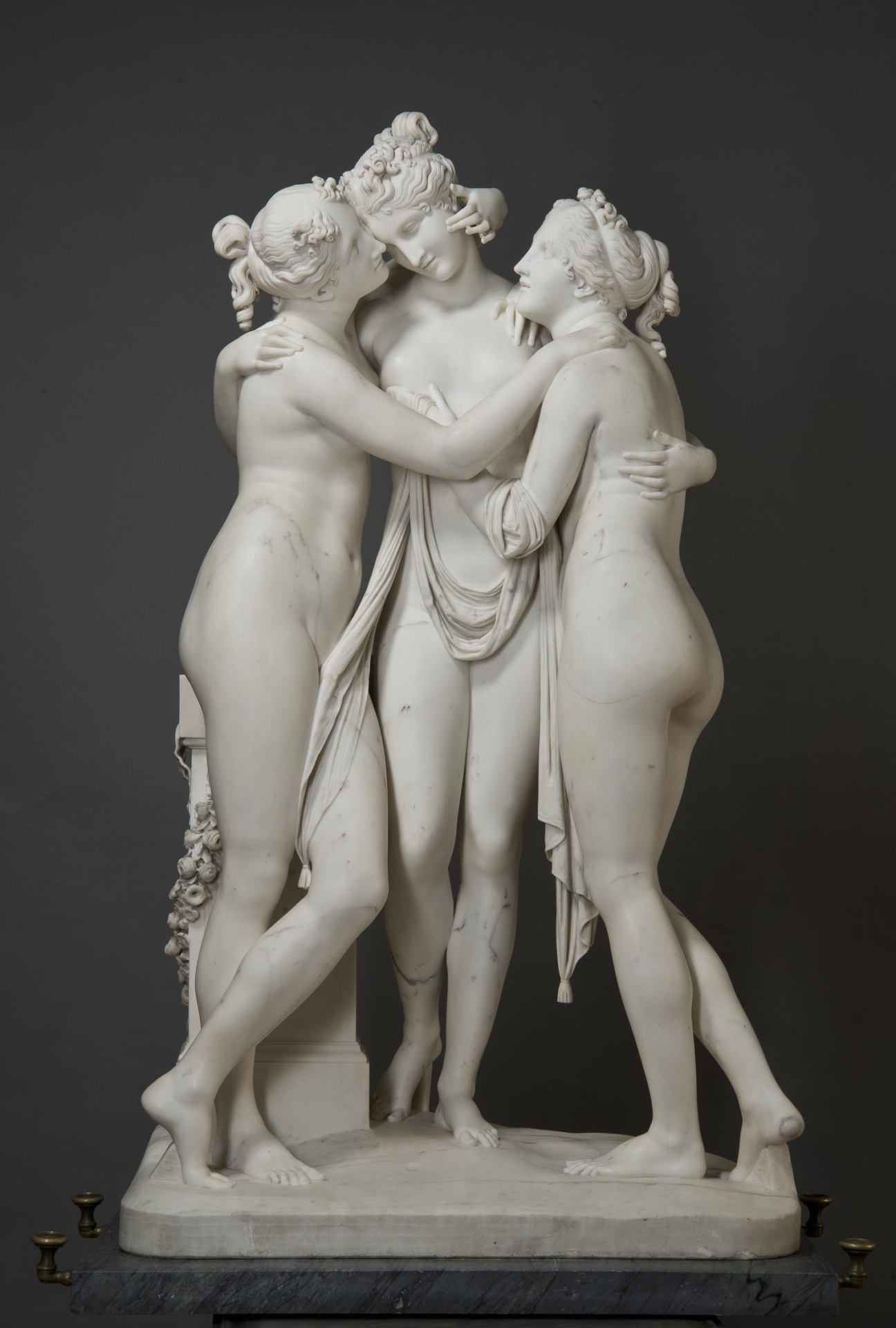
- Canova's first version, now in the Hermitage Museum
- Artist: Antonio Canova
- Year: 1814
- Medium: Sculpture
- Movement: Neoclassicism
- Subject: Charites
- Location: Hermitage Museum Victoria and Albert Museum, Scottish National Gallery

Antonio Canova's statue The Three Graces is a Neoclassical sculpture, in marble, of the mythological three Charites, daughters of Zeus – identified on some engravings of the statue as, from left to right, Euphrosyne, Aglaea and Thalia – who were said to represent mirth (Euphrosyne), elegance (Aglaea), and youth/beauty (Thalia).

The Graces presided over banquets and gatherings, to delight the guests of the gods. As such they have served as subjects for historical artists including Sandro Botticelli and Bertel Thorvaldsen. A version of the sculpture is in the Hermitage Museum, and another is owned jointly and exhibited in turn by the Victoria and Albert Museum, Scottish National Gallery while another one is in Galerie Plastik in Hořice.

== Versions of the piece ==
John Russell, 6th Duke of Bedford, commissioned a version of the now famous work. He had visited Canova's studio in Rome in 1814 and had been immensely impressed by a carving of the Graces which Canova produced for the Empress Josephine. When the Empress died in May of the same year he offered to purchase the completed piece, but was unsuccessful as Josephine's son Eugène claimed it (his son Maximilian brought it to St. Petersburg, where it can now be found in the Hermitage Museum). Undeterred, the Duke commissioned another version for himself.

The sculpting process began in 1814 and was completed in 1817. In 1819 it was installed at the Duke's residence in Woburn Abbey. Canova travelled to England to supervise its installation, choosing to display it on a pedestal adapted from a marble plinth with a rotating top. This item is now owned jointly by the Victoria and Albert Museum and the National Galleries of Scotland, and is alternately displayed at each.

The version in the Hermitage is carved from veined marble and has a square pillar behind the left-hand figure (Euphrosyne). The Woburn Abbey version is carved from white marble and has a round pillar, and the central figure (Aglaea) has a slightly broader waist.

By the time he received the Duke's commission, Canova had already enjoyed an illustrious sculpting career. Born in the Italian province of Treviso in 1757, he was educated by his grandfather and his artistic talent was quickly noticed, especially by a senator, Giovanni Falieri, who introduced him to the sculptor Torretto. Torretto took Canova as apprentice for two years.

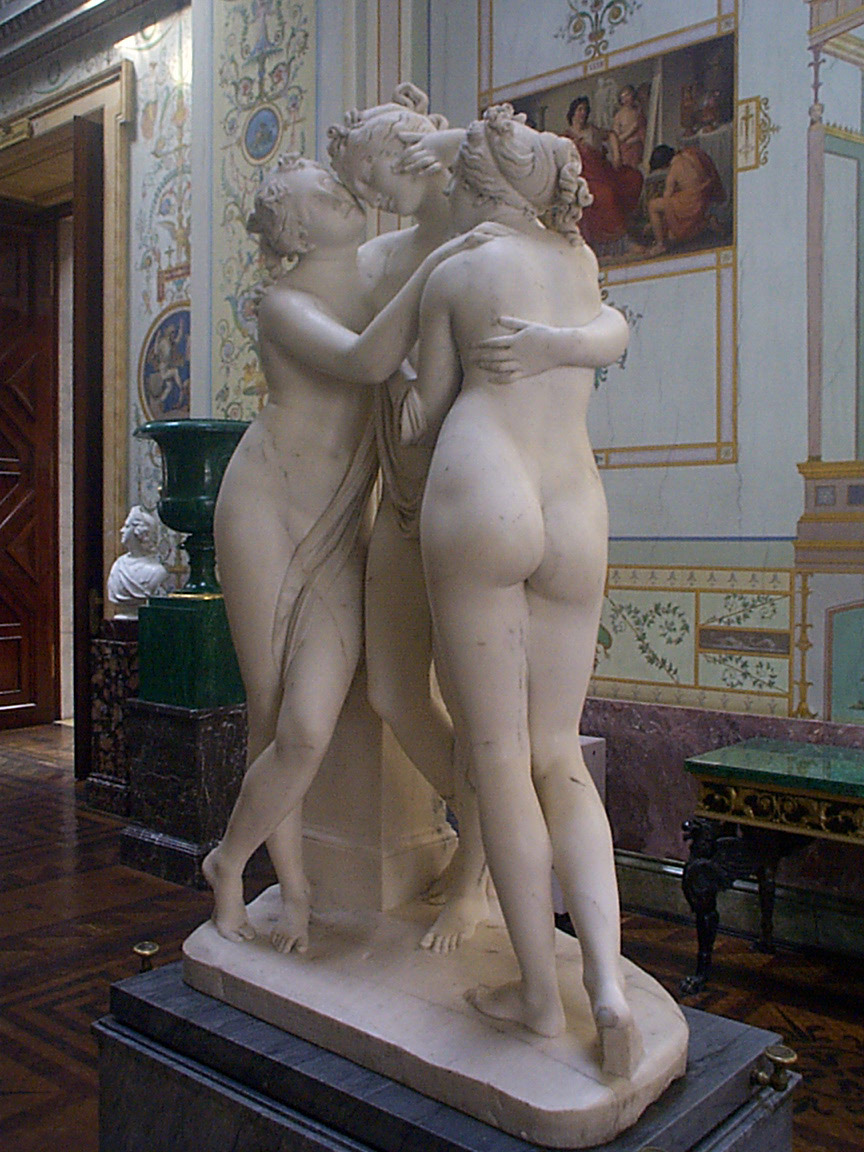
The Three Graces, alternate view, in the Hermitage Museum, Saint Petersburg, Russia

Canova went on to enjoy small commissions, but his fame did not come until 1780 when he traveled to Rome and found himself inspired and invigorated by the scope and quality of the art and architecture. During this time Canova produced some of his most revered works including: Theseus and the Minotaur (1782), his monument to Pope Clement XIV (now displayed in the basilica dei Santi Apostoli) and the masterminding of the sumptuous tomb of Clement XIII in St. Peter's. In 1793 he produced Psyche Revived by Cupid's Kiss, a piece of immaculate composition and flowing beauty.

In 1802, he was called to Paris by Napoleon I to model an enormous figure of the emperor clutching a 'Victory' in his hand. He would also model a bust of the French leader as well as a statue of Napoleon's mother. The fact that these pieces represented only a fraction of his works during this period make his dual commissions to sculpt the Graces understandable.

The sculpture for the Duke of Bedford was based on depictions of the Graces which Canova had previously made, including a 1799 painting, other drawings, and a relief of the Graces that he executed around the same time.

In 1810, he modelled a terracotta sketch (now in the Museum of Fine Arts of Lyon, France). But it is likely that his piece for the Empress Josephine and later the Duke was modelled mainly on the early drawings and a terracotta sketch model. We know that the immediate model for the work was a full-scale plaster group that has survived and is now in the Tempio Canoviano in Possagno. In the Duke of Bedford version, the graces are leaning on a pillar, though in earlier versions this feature was absent.

== Artistic technique and effect ==
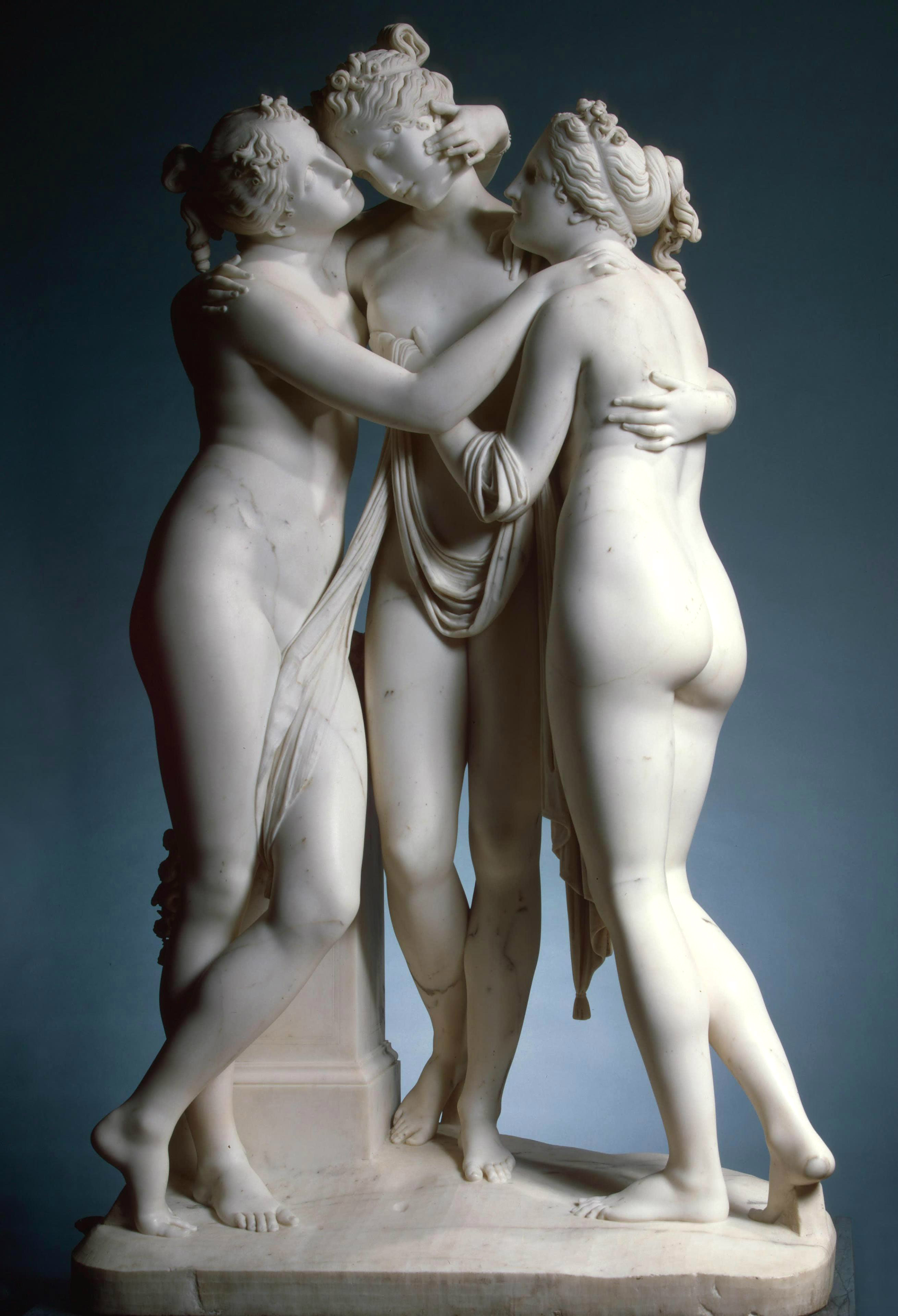
The Three Graces: the Hermitage version

The piece is carved from a single slab of white marble. Canova's assistants roughly blocked out the marble, leaving Canova to perform the final carving and shape the stone to highlight the Graces' soft flesh. This was a trademark of the artist, and the piece shows a strong allegiance to the Neo-Classical movement in sculpture, of which Canova is the prime exponent.

The three goddesses are shown nude, huddled together, their heads almost touching in what many have referred to as an 'erotically charged' piece. They stand, leaning slightly inward — perhaps discussing a common issue, or simply enjoying their closeness. Their hair-styles are similar, braided and held atop their heads in a knot.

The style is elegant and suggests refinement and class — there is a delicate beauty to them that is commonplace in Canova's sculpture. Art historians have often commented on the peaceful balance that seems to exist between the three heads. Unlike compositions of the Graces that were derived from antiquity, where the outer figures turn out towards the viewer and the central figure embraces her friends with her back to the viewer, Canova's figures stand side by side, facing each other.

The three slender female figures become one in their embrace, united by their linked hands and by a scarf which links them. The unity of the Graces is one of the piece's main themes. In Countess Josephine's version, the Graces are on a sacrificial altar adorned with three wreaths of flowers and a garland symbolizing their fragile, close ties.

== Neoclassicism and the Baroque ==
Canova's work challenged the baroque conception of opulent beauty; he shows the Graces as nubile, svelte young women. This is not the only departure that Canova's work makes from the Baroque. For example, The Baroque works of Italian sculptor Bernini presents a stark moment in time — a snapshot. Bernini's 1644 work The Ecstasy of St. Theresa shows the moment at which the holy spirit pierces Theresa's heart, leaving her in what can only be described as ecstasy of divine presence. It is a dramatic, poignant scene captured by Bernini at the moment of greatest impact. Canova's work, however, is different. His pieces do not seem to possess any real sense of time, they merely exist at a point in the past — almost ghostly reminders of a mythological happening or person long deceased. In the case of the Graces he dispenses with theatrics and invites the viewer to make what they will of the scene. This is typical of the Neoclassical movement. In many respects this work was a departure and has since become regarded by many as a benchmark of beauty.
