= Hegemone =

Greek mythological figure

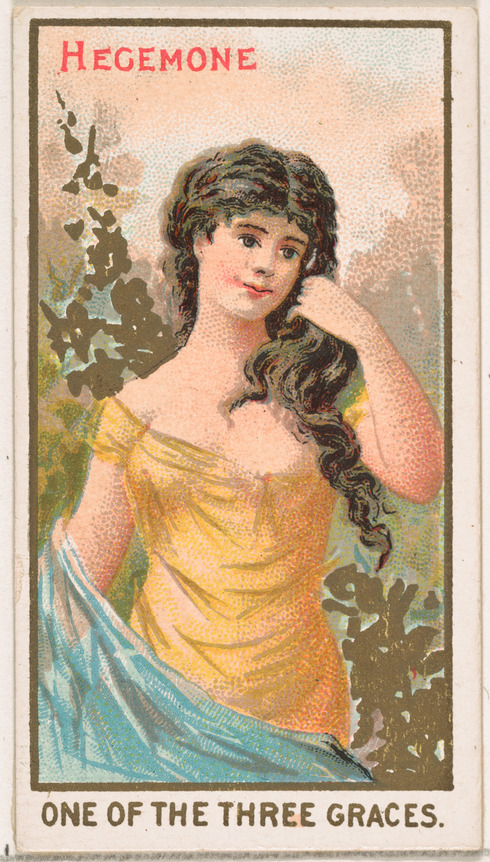
Hegemone from the Goddesses of the Greeks and Romans series (N188) issued by Wm. S. Kimball & Co., Metropolitan Museum of Art.

In ancient Greek religion, Hegemone (Ancient Greek: Ἡγεμόνη, from the feminine form of ἡγεμών, 'leader, guide') was, according to the geographer Pausanias, the name of one of the two Charites worshipped at ancient Athens, the other being Auxo.

== Name ==
Hegemone, as the name of a Charis, can be understood to mean "she who leads" in the sense of "brings the plants forth from the earth".

== Cult ==
Hegemone, along with Auxo, and several other deities including Ares, and Zeus, was invoked as witness to the civic oath sworn by the ephebes of Athens.

Hegemone was also an epithet of the goddesses Artemis and Aphrodite. As applied to Artemis, the name Hegemone is variously translated as "Leader", "Queen", or "Guide". Pausanias reports that Artemis Hegemone had a temple at Lycosura in Arcadia, and a sanctuary at Sparta. The third-century BC poet Callimachus seems to have applied the epithet to Artemis as the guide of the colonists who founded Miletus. Inscriptions attest the presence of a cult of Aphrodite Hegemone, at Rhamnus.

== See also ==
Other Greek Graces include:

- Phaenna
- Pasithea
- Thalia
