= Euanthe (mythology) =

In Greek mythology, Euanthe (/juːˈæn.θiː/; Ancient Greek: Εὐάνθη, romanized: Euánthē) may refer to the following personages:

- Euanthe, mother of the Charites: Aglaia, Euphrosyne and Thalia by Zeus. Other names for the mother of the Charites were Eurynome, Eunomia, Eurydome, and Eurymedousa.
- Euanthe, one of the would-be sacrificial victims of Minotaur.
- Euanthe or Euantheia (Εὐανθεία), mother of Cyzicus by Aineus, son of Apollo and Stilbe.
