= Euanthe =

Euanthe may refer to:

- Euanthe (mythology), the name of multiple figures from Greek mythology
- Euanthe (moon), a small moon of Jupiter
- Euanthe sanderiana, a junior synonym of the orchid species Vanda sanderiana
