= Eurynome (Oceanid) =

Oceanid of Greek mythology

In Greek mythology Eurynome (/jʊˈrɪnəmiː/; Ancient Greek: Εὐρυνόμη, romanized: Eurynómē) was an Oceanid and the mother of the Charites by Zeus.

== Etymology ==
The name is usually segmented Eury-nome. Eury- comes from the Greek εὐρύς "wide". This segment appears in Linear B as e-u-ru–, a prefix in a few men's names. It does not occur in any Mycenaean women's names, nor does –nome. The root of –nome is Proto-Indo-European *nem-, distribute, as in the Greek infinitive, nemein, "to distribute." Words derived from *nem- had a large variety of senses. In the case of Eurynome, the two main senses proposed are "wanderer" and "ruler".

== Genealogy ==
Homer calls Eurynome a daughters of Oceanus, whilst Hesiod and Apollodorus add that Tethys was her mother. According to Hesiod she was the third bride of Zeus and the mother of the Charites, who are named as Aglaia, Euphrosyne, and Thalia. Apollodorus records a tradition in which the river Asopus was also the son of Zeus and Eurynome. The Pseudo-Clementine Recognitions says instead that Asopus was the husband of Eurynome, and that through an affair with her, Zeus was the father of Ogygias.

== Mythology ==
When Hephaestus was cast from Olympus by the goddess Hera, who was disgusted at having borne a crippled child, he was caught by Eurynome and Thetis. Eurynome and Thetis nursed the god Hephaestus on the banks of the earth-encircling river Oceanus, after his fall from heaven. Charis, Eurynome's daughter, later became Hephaestus' bride.

In an separate tradition, Eurynome was queen of the Titans, who ruled Olympus beside her husband Ophion. The pair were wrested from their thrones by Cronus and Rhea who cast them down into the earth-encircling river Oceanus.

== As an epithet of Artemis ==
Pausanias reports that 'Eurynome' was thought by the people of Phigalia to be an epiclesis of Artemis, though he also reports that some there believed she was the daughter of Ocean and helped nurse Hephaestus, as said by Homer.

According to Pausanias there was a sanctuary to Eurynome twelve stadia from the city, which was opened by the Phigalians once per year. It stood in a cypress grove at the confluence of the rivers Neda and Lymax in Arcadia.

During the day on which the sanctuary was opened, day sacrifices were offered by both individuals and the state. Within the sanctuary was her xoanon, a wooden cult statue, which had the upper body of a woman and the lower body of a fish and was bound with golden chains.
