= Kale (mythology) =

Greek goddess

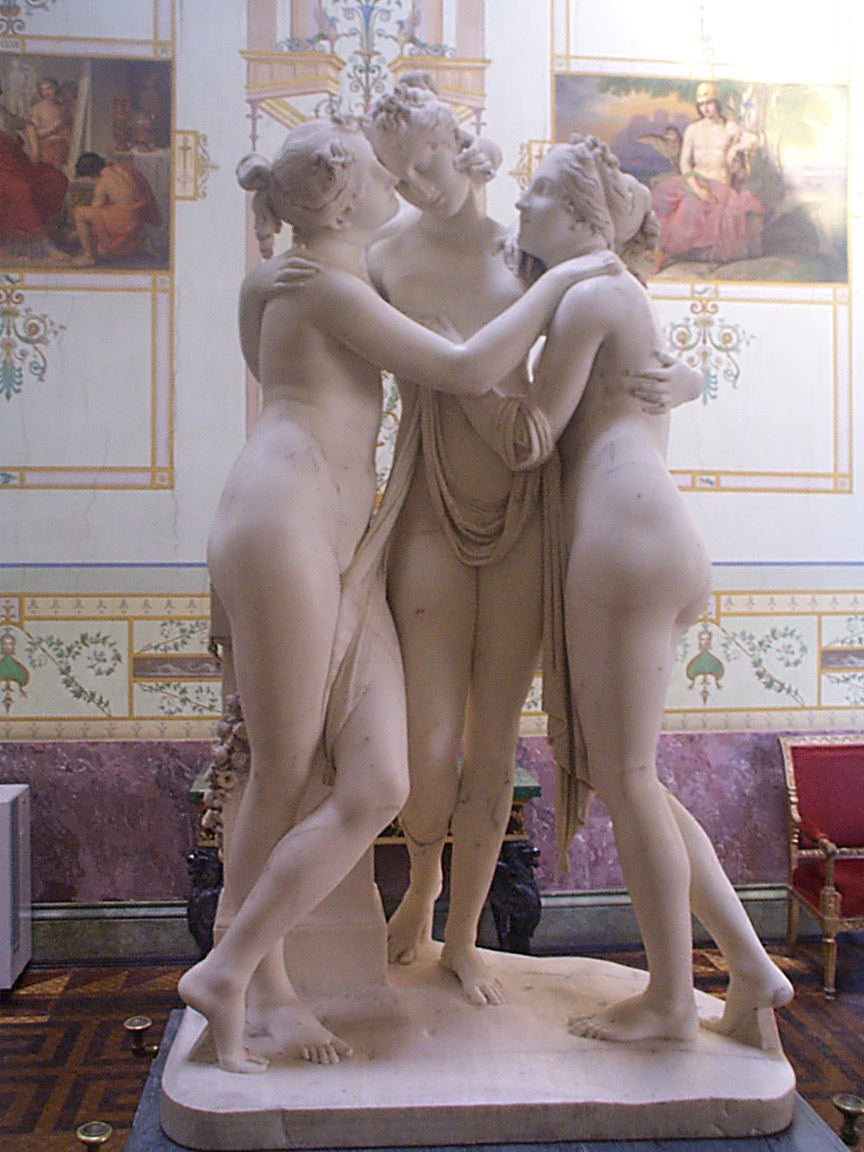
The Three Graces, by Antonio Canova (Hermitage, St. Petersburg)

In Greek mythology, Kale or Cale (Ancient Greek: Καλη, 'Beauty'), also named Kalleis or Calleis (Greek: Καλλεις, 'Beauty'), was one of the Charites (Graces), daughters of Zeus. Kale is the wife of Hephaestus according to some authors (although most have Aphrodite play that role).

== Mythology ==
The name Kale in this passage has led some to conclude that Homer mentions two Charites, Pasithea and Kale, which seems to be a forced separation of three words: Pasi thea kale, meaning ‘the goddess who is beautiful to all men’.

Sostratus (Eustath. ad Hom. p. 1665) relates that Aphrodite and the three Charites, Pasithea, Kale and Euphrosyne, disputed about their beauty with one another, and when Teiresias awarded the prize to Kale he was changed by Aphrodite into an old woman, but Kale rewarded him with a beautiful head of hair and took him to Crete.
