= Sacrificial victims of the Minotaur =

Concept in Greek mythology

In Greek mythology, the people of Athens were at one point compelled by King Minos of Crete to choose fourteen young noble citizens (seven young men and seven young women) to be offered as sacrificial victims to the half-human, half-bull monster Minotaur to be killed in retribution for the death of Minos' son Androgeos.

== Mythology ==
The victims were drawn by lots, were required to go unarmed, and would end up either being consumed by the Minotaur or getting lost and perishing in the Labyrinth, the maze-like structure where the Minotaur was kept. The offerings were to take place every one, seven or nine years and lasted until Theseus volunteered to join the third group of the would-be victims, killed the monster, and led his companions safely out of the Labyrinth.

Plutarch in his Life of Theseus cites a rationalized version of this myth, referring to Philochorus who in his turn claimed to be following a local Cretan tradition. According to it, the young people were not actually killed but given as prizes to winners of the funeral games of Androgeos. The Labyrinth was an ordinary dungeon where they were temporarily kept. The winner who received them as a prize was Taurus, the most powerful general of Minos; he mistreated the young people, thus gaining the reputation of a monster. Plutarch further cites Aristotle's non-extant The Constitution of the Bottiaeans, in which the young Athenians were reportedly said to not have been killed in Crete, but enslaved for the rest of their lives. Moreover, when, generations later, the Cretans sent an offering of their firstborn to Delphi in fulfillment of an oath, descendants of these Athenians happened to be among those sent. The whole group settled at Delphi but soon came to be unable to sustain themselves so they proceeded to move first to Iapygia in Italy and then to Bottiaea in Thrace.

== Names ==
The individual names of the youths that sailed to Crete together with Theseus are very poorly preserved in extant sources. All of the recoverable information is collected in W. H. Roscher's Ausführliches Lexikon der griechischen und römischen Mythologie, which provides four alternate lists of names. These are as follows.

List 1 (based on the largely corrupt one found in Servius, with variant emendations by different scholars)

No.	Young Men	Young Women
1.	Hippophorbas, son of Alypus or Eurybius (Aethlius or Elatus)	Periboea/ Eriboea, daughter of Alcathous
2.	Idas, son of Arcas	Melanippe/ Medippe/ Melippe, daughter of Pyrrhus/ Perius/ Pylius
3.	Antimachus (Antiochus), son of Euander	Hesione, daughter of Celeus
4.	Menestheus (Menesthes), son of Suniates or from Sounion	Andromache, daughter of Eurymedon
5.	Amphidocus (Pidokos or Dailochos), son of Rhamnus	Eurymedusa, daughter of Polyxenus
6.	Demoleon, son of Cydamus or Cydas	Europe, daughter of Laodicus
7.	Porphyrion, son of Celeus	Melite, daughter of Tricorythus/ Tricolonus/ Triagonus

List 2 (source: painting on François Vase; CIG 4. 8185)

No.	Young Men	Young Women
1.	Phaedimus	Hip[p]odameia
2.	Daedochus (=Dadouchus; or Dailochus?)	Menestho
3.	[Eu]rysthenes	Coronis
4.	Heuchistratus (=Euxistratus)	Damasistrate
5.	Antiochus	Asteria
6.	Hernipus (=Hermippus)	Lysidice
7.	Procritus	Eriboea

List 3 (source: black-figure painting on a vessel by Archicles and Glaucytes, from Vulci, in Munich; CIG 4. 8139)

No.	Young Men	Young Women
1.	Lycinus	Euanthe
2.	Antias	Anthylla
3.	Simon	Glyce
4.	Lycius	Enpedo (=Empedo)
5.	Solon	Eutil...
6.	Timo...	Eunice

List 4 (incomplete; source: black-figure painting on a different vase from Vulci, in Leiden; CIG 4. 7719)

No.	Young Men	Young Women
1.	Phaenip[p]us	Ti[mon]ice
2.	Astydama[s]	Demodice
3.	Callicrates	
4.	Procritus	

Of these only Eriboea (Periboea), the daughter of Alcathous, does appear in extant literary sources and has a surviving independent mythological backstory.

It is also remarked in the Lexicon that some of the names on Servius' list have been observed to correspond to names of the Attic demes (viz. Antiochus: Antiochis; Cydas/Cydamus: Cydantidae; Melite: Melite (deme) and Melite; name of Melite's father: Tricorynthus), which makes it more or less safe to assume that they may have come from an epic poem about Theseus. The vase painters, on the other hand, could have simply made the names up, although those on Lists 2 and 4 have been found reminiscent of the epic tradition as well. The name Procritus, appearing on two of the four lists, has been compared to "Procris", although others suggested the reading "Herocritus" instead. The names Polyxenus, Celeus and Menestheus on List 1 (if restored correctly) also recall the Attic heroes Polyxenus, Celeus and Menestheus.
