= Pasithea =

One of the Graces in Greek mythology

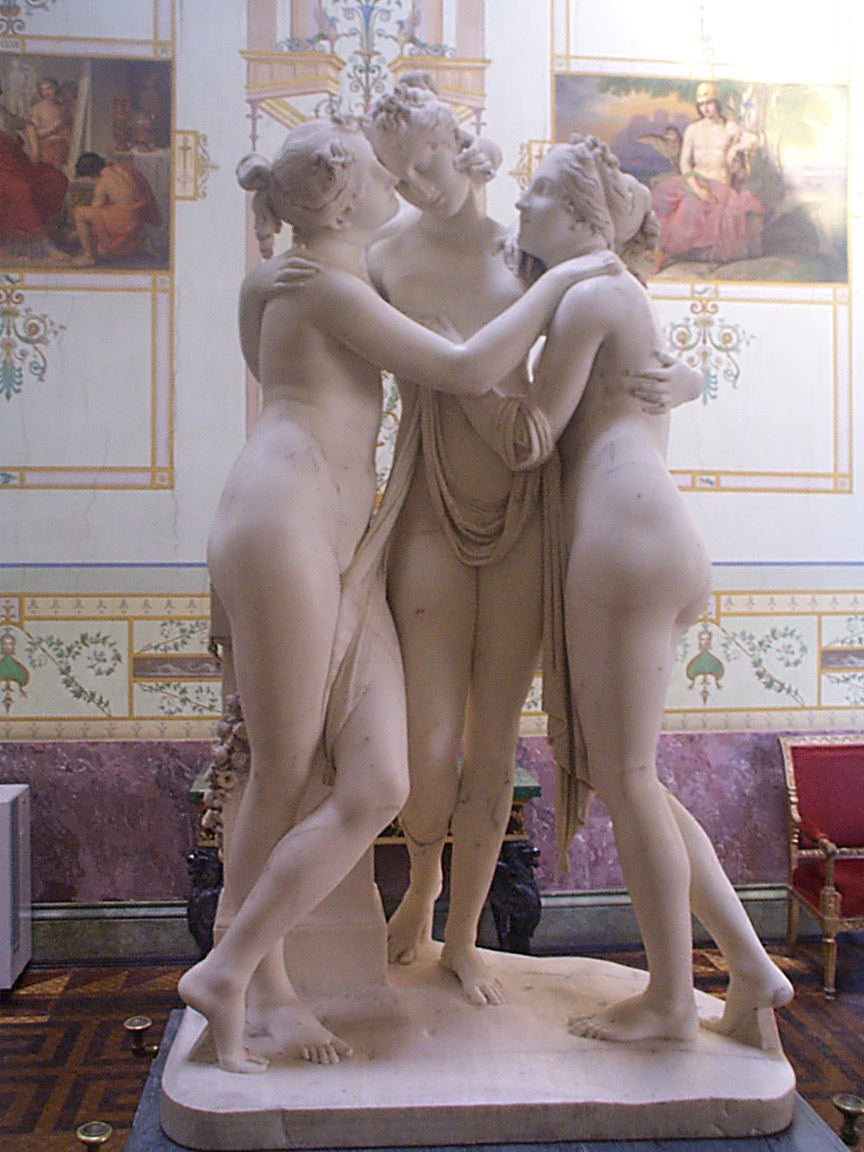
The Three Graces, by Antonio Canova (Hermitage, St. Petersburg)

In Greek mythology, Pasithea, Pasithee or Pasitheia (Ancient Greek: Πασιθέα) was one of the Charites and the wife of Hypnos. In the Dionysiaca, the epic poem of Nonnus (fifth century CE), she and the other Charites are the attendants of Aphrodite.

== Name ==
The meaning of the name is obscure and no recent proposals have been made. Benjamin Hederich (1770) states that 'Ihr Namen soll so viel heißen, als die zu allen laufende' ('her name supposedly means "the one who runs to all"'), which he takes to refer to the universal nature and general pleasantness of sleep. Josef Korn, writing under the pseudonym Friedrich Nork, (1843) took it to mean 'die von Allen veherte Göttin' ('the Goddess revered by all'), assuming that it originally referred to Aphrodite.

== Family ==
Although Pasithea is named in the Iliad of Homer, and offered in marriage to Hypnos by Hera, no explicit parentage for her is given. In his Posthomerica, the fourth Century CE Greek poet Quintus Smyrnaeus refers to Hypnos and Hera as being related via marriage, thus possibly making Hera Pasithea's mother. In the Dionysiaca, her father is named as Dionysus, and separately, her mother as Hera. Nonnus does not explain how these two, who are opponents throughout the epic, came to be her parents. Later in book 48, Nonnus makes Dionysos and one Coronis the parents of 'the three Graces', which probably includes Pasithea. As Nonnus has Hera as the mother of Pasithea in his Dionysiaca, Pasithea can also be said to be a half sister of Jesus Christ as Hera is identified with the Virgin Mary in one ancient text.

== Mythology ==
In the Iliad, Pasithea is one of the younger Charites/Graces. In book 14, Hera approaches Hypnos, the god of sleep, for help in temporarily removing Zeus from the action of the Trojan War. In exchange for his aid, Hera swears an oath on the Styx, promising Pasithea in marriage to Hypnos, who, it is stated, had always loved her. The same story is referenced, though not retold, by Quintus Smyrnaeus in the Posthomerica.

She is mentioned briefly by the Roman poet Catullus (c. 84 – c. 54 BCE) in Poem 63, and in an epigram attributed to Antipater of Thessalonica in the Greek Anthology as the consort of Hypnos. She is also mentioned passingly by the Roman poet Statius, who, in contrast to Homer, makes her the eldest of the Graces in his Thebaid, but gives no other details about her.

Another brief mention of Pasithea comes from a summary of an elgaic poem by 'Sostratus' (who is otherwise unknown) preserved by Eustathius in his commentary on the Odyssey. According to Eustathius's summary, part of the poem involves a variation of the Judgement of Paris. Tieresias attends the wedding of Peleus and Thetis, where a beauty contest is held between Aphrodite and the three graces – named as Pasithea, Kale and Euphrosyne – for which Tieresias acts as judge. He announces Kale to be the most beautiful, which incurs the wrath of Aphrodite, who turns him into an old woman. In response Kale makes Tieresias beautiful and takes her to Crete.

=== Dionysiaca ===
Pasithea has a larger role in the Dionysiaca than in any other surviving source, albeit still small. The epic relates the story of Dionysus from his birth up to his acceptance as one of the Olympian gods. In book 13 of the poem, Zeus orders Dionysus to "drive out of Asia with his avenging thyrsus the proud race of Indians untaught of justice". A series of protracted battles over many years follow, with Hera always taking the side of Dionysus' opponents. In book 31, Nonnus reuses Homer's deception of Zeus episode in a different context. Hera commands Iris to take on the form of Nyx, the mother of Hypnos, and visit him to convince him to make Zeus fall asleep for a day so that Hera can help the opponents of Dionysus. As in Homer, the proffered reward for helping Hera is the hand of Pasithea – explicitly named as Hera's daughter – in marriage. She gives Iris a list of places in which she might find Hypnos, including Pasithea's home, Orchomenus. Again, as in Homer, Hypnos accepts the offer.

In book 32, whilst Zeus is asleep through the machinations of Hera, and thanks to the help of Hypnos, the Fury Megaera, lent to Hera by Persephone, drives Dionysos mad, allowing his opponents to devastate his troops. In book 33, Pasithea, gathering shoots and flowers to make ointment for Aphrodite, sees the madness of Dionysus and returns to Aphrodite saddened by what she has seen. Aphrodite sees Pasithea's sadness and assumes it is due to Hypnos's efforts to woo her, and tells her that she will not force marriage upon her, if that is not what Pasithea wishes. Pasithea confesses that her sorrow is not caused by Hypnos, but by the state of her father. She beseeches Aphrodite, as Dionysus's sister, to go to his aid, and Aphrodite sends Eros to shoot the warrior Morrheus with his arrows, making him fall in love with the bacchant Chalcomedeia and distracting him from the battle.

Pasithea also appears in a self-contained story in book 24 of the Dionysiaca, in which the story of Aphrodite trying to use the loom of Athena is told by rhapsode Leucos at the request of Lapethos. Because Aphrodite is unskilled in weaving and its related tasks, the thread she spins before she begins to weave is coarse and thick, and when she attempts to weave with it her work in uneven and the thickness of the thread causes the warp threads to break. Her attendants, Pasithea, Peitho and Aglaea help her by spinning the thread, preparing the wool for spinning, and passing the spun thread to Aphrodite respectively. When Athena discovers what Aphrodite is doing, she summons the other gods to see, and their laughter and mockery results in Aphrodite giving up the task and returning to her own domain of affairs, allowing marriages and other aspects of life related to love to resume.

The scene is a clear reference to book 8 of the Odyssey, which contains a story related by the rhapsode Demodocus. The story is that of Aphrodite and Ares being caught naked together by Hephaestus in the marriage bed of Aphrodite and Hephaestus. Hephaestus catches them in a trap of his own design – a skilfully made golden net of thread so fine as to be invisible. Once the two are caught, Hephaestus summons the other gods to the scene, who laugh at the situation the two lovers are in. When the two are finally freed Aphrodite flees to Paphos where the Graces – unnamed – bathe her, anoint her with oil, and clothe her in fine garments.

== Iconography ==
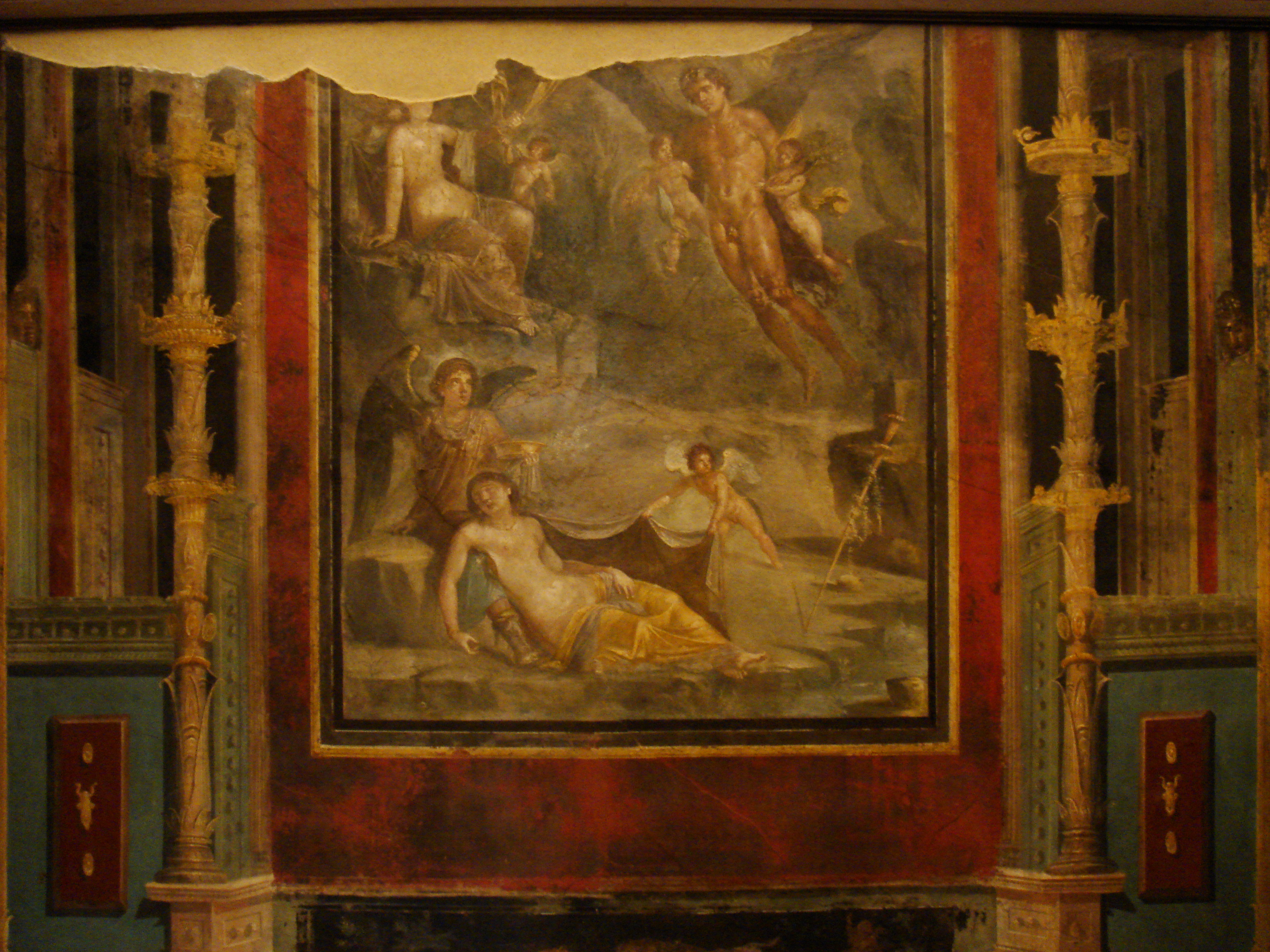
Fresco from the House of Naviglio, Pompeii.

There are no surviving artistic sources in which the identification of Pasithea is certain. Three possible depictions have been suggested, though none are without problem.

An inscription above a woman on a red-figure lekythos attributed to the Bowdoin painter and currently in the collection of the Musée d'Art et d'Histoire in Geneva names the depicted figure as Pasithea, but it is unclear which Pasithea is represented because a Nereid of the same name is known from Hesiod's Theogony. The attributes shown with the figure – a mirror and two alabstra hanging on the wall – would be suitable for one of the graces, though it is not enough to rule out a Nereid. Erika Simon notes, however, that Nereids are usually depicted in groups. A third possibility suggested by Simon is that the figure depicted is a hetaira, for whom the name of a Grace would also be appropriate. The 'spinning hetaira' is a common motif on vases, though the identification of the woman in the motif as a hetaira is highly debated.

Pasithea is also possibly present on a red-figure from 400-380 BCE bell krater attributed to the Sarpedon Painter. The vase depicts a scene of a female figure addressing a male and female figure sitting on thrones, interpreted to be Zeus and Hera based on their props. A winged male figure, smaller than the couple, distracts the enthroned female figure. On the assumption that the winged figure is Hypnos, the woman could be Pasithea.

A third possible depiction of Pasithea is in a fresco from Pompeii, from the House of Naviglio. The more usual interpretation of the fresco is that it depicts Zephyrus and Chloris, but Erik Simon suggests that the sleeping figure could be Pasithea, with the female figure above being Hera, preciding over the coming marriage between Hypnos and Pasithea.
