= Prende =

Albanian dawn goddess, goddess love, beauty, fertility and health

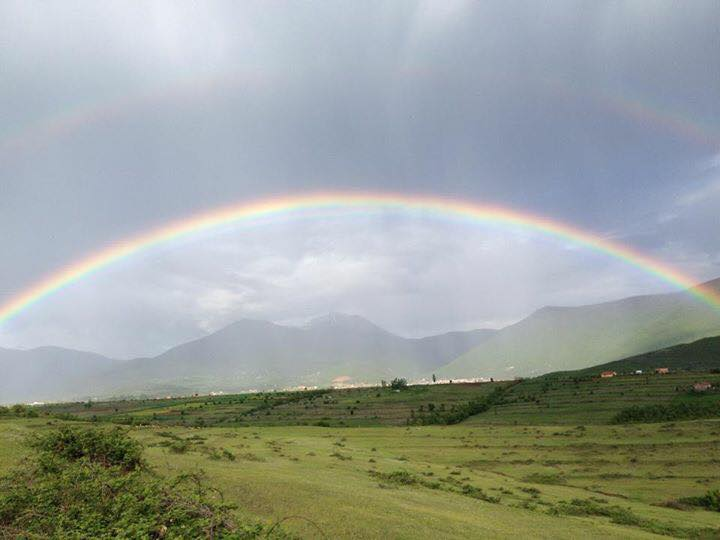
Rainbow in Northern Albania. In Albanian folk beliefs the rainbow is regarded as "the belt of Zoja Prenne".

Prende or Premte (Note: Dialectal variants include: Gheg Albanian P(ë)rende (def. P(ë)renda), Pren(n)e (def. Pren(n)a); Tosk Albanian: Premte (def. Premtja), Preme (def. Prema). The Albanian name is claimed by some to be a cognate with the Ancient Greek Περσεφάττα Persephatta, a variant of Persephone, both from the Indo-European *pers-é-bʰ(h₂)n̥t-ih₂ ("she who brings the light through").) is the dawn goddess, goddess of love, beauty, fertility, health and protector of women, in the Albanian pagan mythology. She is also called Afër-dita, an Albanian phrase meaning "near day", "the day is near", or "dawn", (Note: Afërdita or Gheg Albanian: Afêrdita is the native Albanian name of the planet Venus; Afro-dita is its Albanian imperative form meaning "come forth the day/dawn".) in association with the cult of the planet Venus, the morning and evening star. (Note: Albanian: (h)ylli i dritës, Afërdita "the Star of Light, Afërdita" (i.e. Venus, the morning star) and (h)ylli i mbrëmjes, Afërdita (i.e. Venus, the evening star).) She is referred to as Zoja Prenne or Zoja e Bukuris ("Goddess/Lady Prenne" or "Goddess/Lady of Beauty"). Her sacred day is Friday, named in Albanian after her: e premte, premtja (Gheg Albanian: e prende, prendja). She reflects features belonging to the original Indo-European dawn goddess. A remarkable reflection associated with the Indo-European dawn goddess is the Albanian tradition according to which Prende is the daughter of the sky god – Zojz.

Thought to have been worshiped by the Illyrians in antiquity, Prende is identified with the cult of Venus and she was worshipped in northern Albania, especially by the Albanian women, until recent times. She features attributes also belonging to Aphrodite, Iris, and Helen, as well as Persephone as shown by the etymology of her name. Describing a goddess of the underworld and at the same time a personification of springtime, the Albanian e Bukura e Dheut ("the Beauty of the Earth") is evidently an epithet of the Albanian equivalent of Persephone.

In Christian times she was called ShënePremte or Shën Prende ("Saint Veneranda"), identified by the Catholic Church as Saint Anne, mother of Virgin Mary. She was so popular in Albania that over one in eight of the Catholic churches existing in the late 16th and the early 17th centuries were named after her. Many other historical Catholic and Orthodox churches were dedicated to her in the 18th and 19th centuries.

== Name ==
=== Variants ===
Dialectal variants include: Gheg Albanian P(ë)rende (def. P(ë)renda), Pren(n)e (def. Pren(n)a); Tosk Albanian: Premte (def. Premtja), Preme (def. Prema).

Prende is also called Afërdita (Afêrdita in Gheg Albanian) in association with the cult of the planet Venus, the morning and evening star, which in Albanian is referred to as (h)ylli i dritës, Afërdita "the Star of Light, Afërdita" (i.e. Venus, the morning star) and (h)ylli i mbrëmjes, Afërdita (i.e. Venus, the evening star). Afër-dita, an Albanian phrase meaning "near day", "the day is near", or "dawn", is the native Albanian name of the planet Venus. Afro-dita is its Albanian imperative form meaning "come forth the day/dawn".

The Albanian translation of "evening" is also rendered as πρέμε premë in the Albanian-Greek dictionary of Marko Boçari.

In northern Albania, Prende is referred to as Zoja Prenne or Zoja e Bukuris "Goddess/Lady Prenne" or "Goddess/Lady of Beauty".

=== Etymology ===
The Albanian name Premtë or P(ë)rende is thought to correspond regularly to the Ancient Greek counterpart Περσεφάττα (Persephatta), a variant of Περσεφόνη (Persephone). The theonyms have been traced back to the Indo-European *pers-é-bʰ(h₂)n̥t-ih₂ ("she who brings the light through").

The Albanian phrase afro dita 'come forth the day/dawn' traces back to Proto-Albanian *apro dītā 'come forth brightness of the day/dawn', from Indo-European *h₂epero déh₂itis. The theonym Aprodita is attested in Messapic inscriptions in Apulia, which is considered to be a Messapic theonym of an Indo-European goddess.

== Role ==
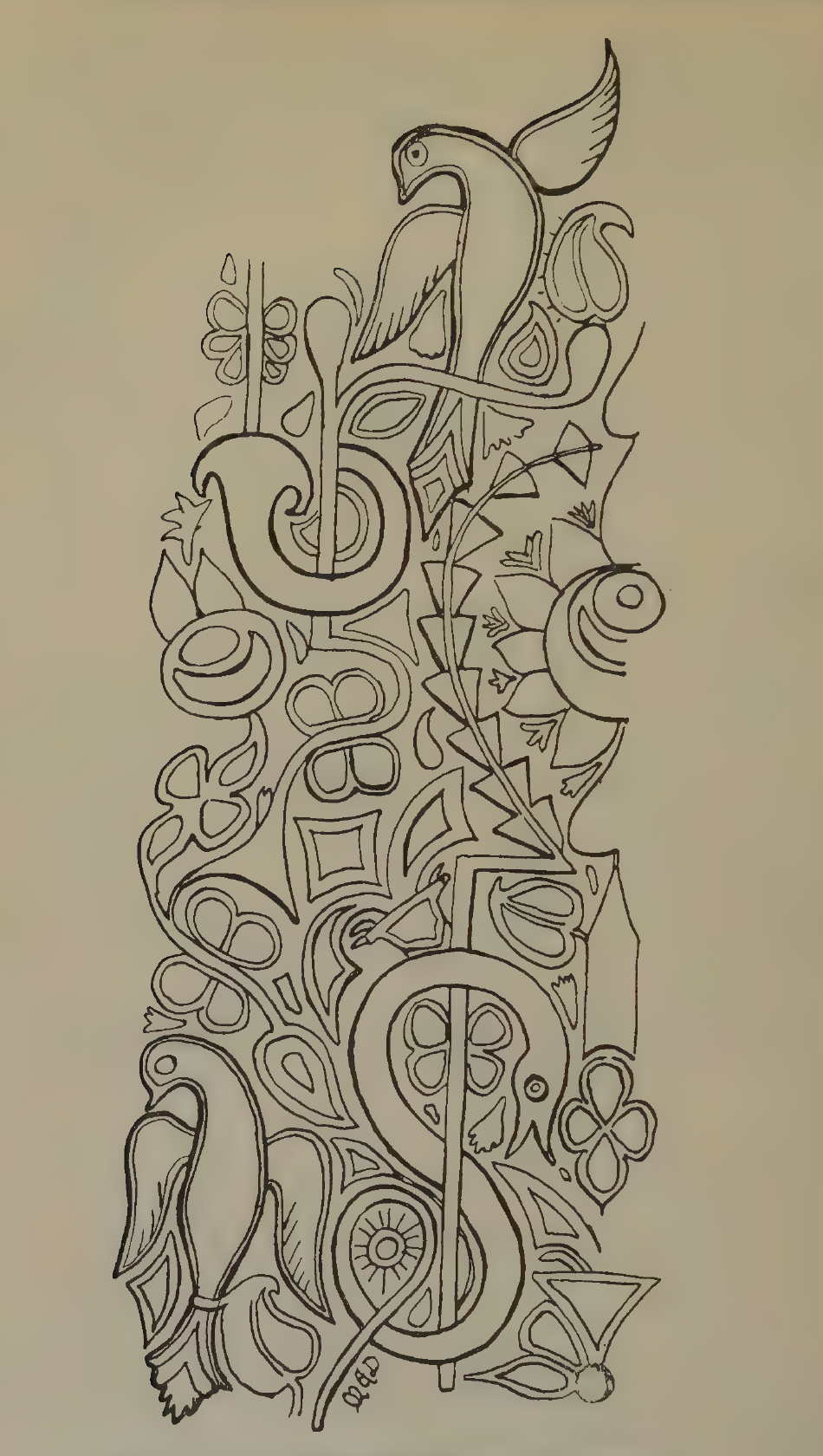
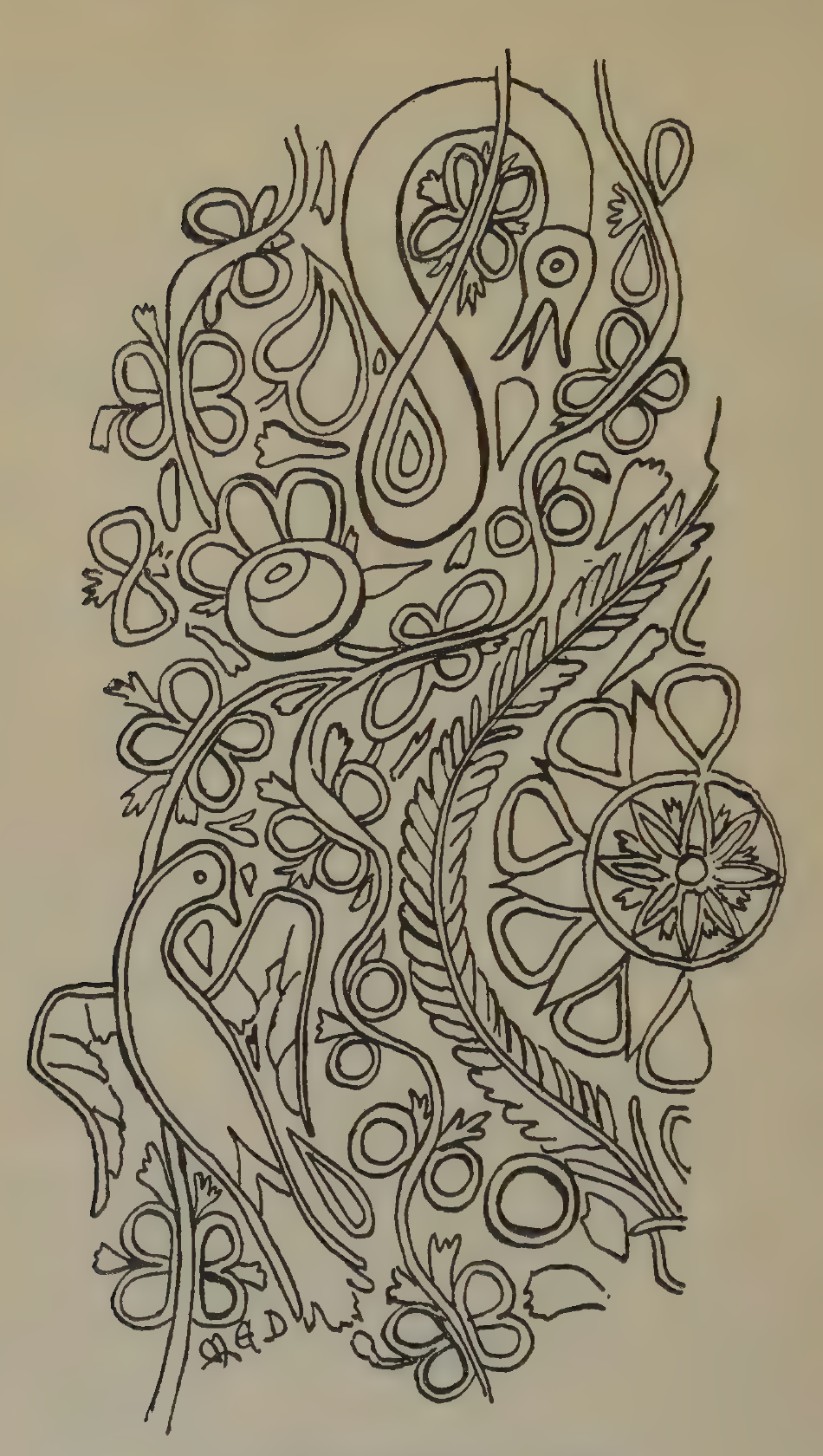
Albanian traditional art with an elaborate design representing the sun, serpent, bird (dove), wheat and flowering plant. Embroidered on the scarlet cloak that is traditionally given on the weddingday by the bridegroom to the bride (Catholic of Shkodra), the pattern suggests a fertility cult. Drawn by Edith Durham in the early 20th century.

In the Albanian pagan mythology Prende is the dawn goddess, goddess of love, beauty, fertility and health. She is considered the Albanian equivalent of the Roman Venus, Norse Freyja and Greek Aphrodite. In mythological terms Prende has attributes that also belong to Aphrodite, Iris and Helen, and is considered to be etymologically related to Persephone. Describing a goddess of the underworld and at the same time a personification of springtime, the Albanian e Bukura e Dheut ("the Beauty of the Earth") is evidently an epithet of the Albanian equivalent of Persephone.

According to some Albanian traditions, Prende is the daughter of Zojz, the Albanian sky and lightning god. Associated with the dawn goddess, the epithet "daughter of the sky-god" is commonly found in Indo-European traditions (cf. H₂éwsōs#Epithets).

According to folk beliefs, swallows, called Pulat e Zojës "the Lady's Birds", pull Prende across the sky in her chariot. Swallows are connected to the chariot by the rainbow (Ylberi), which the people also call Brezi or Shoka e Zojës "the Lady's Belt".

The common Albanian name nepërkë for the venomous snake adder, viper appears in the Arbëresh variety of Calabria as nepromtja, probably based on Prende / Premte.

== Worship ==
Prende was worshipped in northern Albania, especially by the Albanian women until recent times. Prende's festival was celebrated on July 26 every year, and her devotees would don beautiful clothing and would set out a mortar and pestle as a representation of sexual union. Rainbow is regarded in popular beliefs as Prende's belt, and oral legend has it that anyone who jumps over the rainbow changes their sex. The goddess Prende is associated in Albanian folk beliefs with the cult of the planet Venus (Afërdita in Albanian).

When Albania became Christianized in antiquity, Prende was identified by the Catholic Church as Saint Anne, mother of Virgin Mary, and was called "Saint Veneranda" (Tosk Albanian: ShënePremte or Gheg Albanian: Shën Prende), later also associated with Greek Paraskevi, Romanian Sfânta Paraschiva, South Slavic Petka. Another Albanian Christian saint thought by some to have a non-Christian origin is Gjin.

Prende was so popular in Albania that of the some 275 Catholic churches recorded to have existed in Albania in the late 16th and the early 17th centuries, 33 were named after her, more than to any other saint except Virgin Mary and Saint Nicholas. Many other historical Catholic and Orthodox churches were dedicated to her in the 18th and 19th centuries. In the Kurbin valley pilgrimages to the church of Saint Veneranda were common among both Christians and Muslims. There people went also in the hope of a cure for mental illness.

As is usual in many cultures, in Albania the day sacred to the goddess of love is Friday, named in the Albanian language after her: dita e premte, premtja (Gheg Albanian: dita e prende, prendja).

== In popular culture ==
Prende, Pren(n)e and their masculine counterparts Prend, Preng, Prenk, Pren, etc., are Albanian given names, traditionally found among Albanian Catholics.

"Prende Publishing", from the publishing house Histria Books, was named for the Albanian goddess Prende.

== See also ==
- Albanian mythology
- Illyrian religion
- En
- Perëndi
- Venus
- Freyja

== Bibliography ==
- Alpion, Gëzim (2021) [2020]. Mother Teresa: The Saint and Her Nation. Bloomsbury Publishing. ISBN 9789389812466.
- Çabej, Eqrem (2015) [1968]. "Die Albanischen Mundarten in Kalabrien". In Rudolf Baehr; Kurt Wais; W. Theodor Elwert; Heinrich Lausberg (eds.). Serta Romanica: Festschrift für Gerhard Rohlfs zum 75. Geburtstag (in German). Walter de Gruyter GmbH & Co KG. ISBN 9783110945096.
- Camaj, Martin; Fox, Leonard (January 1984). Albanian Grammar: With Exercises, Chrestomathy and Glossaries. Otto Harrassowitz Verlag. ISBN 978-3-447-02467-9.
- Dedvukaj, Lindon (2023). "Linguistic evidence for the Indo-European and Albanian origin of Aphrodite". Proceedings of the Linguistic Society of America. 8 (1). Linguistic Society of America: 5500. doi:10.3765/plsa.v8i1.5500. S2CID 258381736.
- Demiraj, Bardhyl; Starostin, Sergei; Lubotsky, Alexander; de Vaan, Michiel. "The Albanian inherited lexicon" (Database).
- Dunwich, Gerina (2000). Wicca Love Spells. Kensington Publishing Corporation. ISBN 0-8065-1782-4.
- Durham, Edith (1928). Some tribal origins, laws and customs of the Balkans. George Allen & Unwin. ISBN 978-0-598-76888-9.
- Elsie, Robert (2001). A Dictionary of Albanian Religion, Mythology and Folk Culture. London: Hurst & Company. ISBN 1-85065-570-7.
- Elsie, Robert (2000). "The Christian Saints of Albania". Balkanistica. 13. American Association for South Slavic Studies.
- Frashëri, Naim (1980). Dhimitër S. Shuteriqi (ed.). Vepra të zgjedhura. Vol. 1. Akademia e Shkencave e RPSSH.
- Galaty, Michael; Lafe, Ols; Lee, Wayne; Tafilica, Zamir (2013). Light and Shadow: Isolation and Interaction in the Shala Valley of Northern Albania. The Cotsen Institute of Archaeology Press. ISBN 978-1931745710.
- Hyllested, Adam; Joseph, Brian D. (2022). "Albanian". In Olander, Thomas (ed.). The Indo-European Language Family : A Phylogenetic Perspective. Cambridge University Press. pp. 223–245. doi:10.1017/9781108758666. ISBN 9781108758666. S2CID 161016819.
- Hyllested, Adam (2024). "The Indo-European origins of Persephone and the Albanian goddess Premtë". Book of Abstracts – The Speakers of Indo-European and Their World: 17th Fachtagung of the Society for Indo-European Studies 9–12 September 2024, Basel University (Switzerland) (PDF). University of Basel. pp. 60–61.
- Kostallari, Androkli (1981). Fjalor i gjuhës së sotme shqipe (in Albanian). Vol. 1. Tiranë: Rilindja.
- Lambertz, Maximilian (1922). Albanische Märchen (und andere Texte zur albanischen Volkskunde). Wien: A. Hölder.
- Lambertz, Maximilian (1973). "Die Mythologie der Albaner". In Hans Wilhelm Haussig (ed.). Wörterbuch der Mythologie (in German). Vol. 2. pp. 455–509.
- Lurker, Manfred (2005). The Routledge Dictionary of Gods and Goddesses, Devils and Demons. Routledge, Taylor & Francis. ISBN 0-203-64351-8.
- Marchesini, Simona (2021). "I Messapi nel Mediterraneo" [The Messapians in the Mediterranean]. Storia dei Mediterranei: Relazioni linguistiche, viaggi, politiche di dominio, conflitti. Annale 3. Mediterraneo e storia. Vol. 35. Edizioni di storia e studi sociali. pp. 10–42. ISBN 9788899168544.
- Plangarica, Tomor (2001). Christiane Montécot; Vladimir Osipov; Sophie Vassilaki (eds.). "Les noms propres en albanais et quelques-unes de leurs particularités à l'époque actuelle". Cahiers balkaniques. 32. Publications Langues'O: 39–54. ISBN 9782858311286. ISSN 0290-7402.
- Sedaj, Engjëll (1982). "Ngjashmëri të hyjnive homerike dhe atyre shqiptare". Gjurmime Albanologjike. Albanological Institute of Prishtina: 71–90.
- Thomaj, Jan (2002). Fjalor i shqipes së sotme: me rreth 34.000 fjalë (in Albanian). Botimet Toena. ISBN 9789992716076.
- Treimer, Karl (1971). "Zur Rückerschliessung der illyrischen Götterwelt und ihre Bedeutung für die südslawische Philologie". In Henrik Barić (ed.). Arhiv za Arbanasku starinu, jezik i etnologiju. Vol. I. R. Trofenik. pp. 27–33.
- Yochalas, Titos (1980). Το Ελληνο-Αλβανικόν Λεξικόν του Μάρκου Μπότσαρη [The Greek-Albanian Dictionary of Markos Botsaris]. Academy of Greece.
