= Charis (mythology) =

Greek goddess

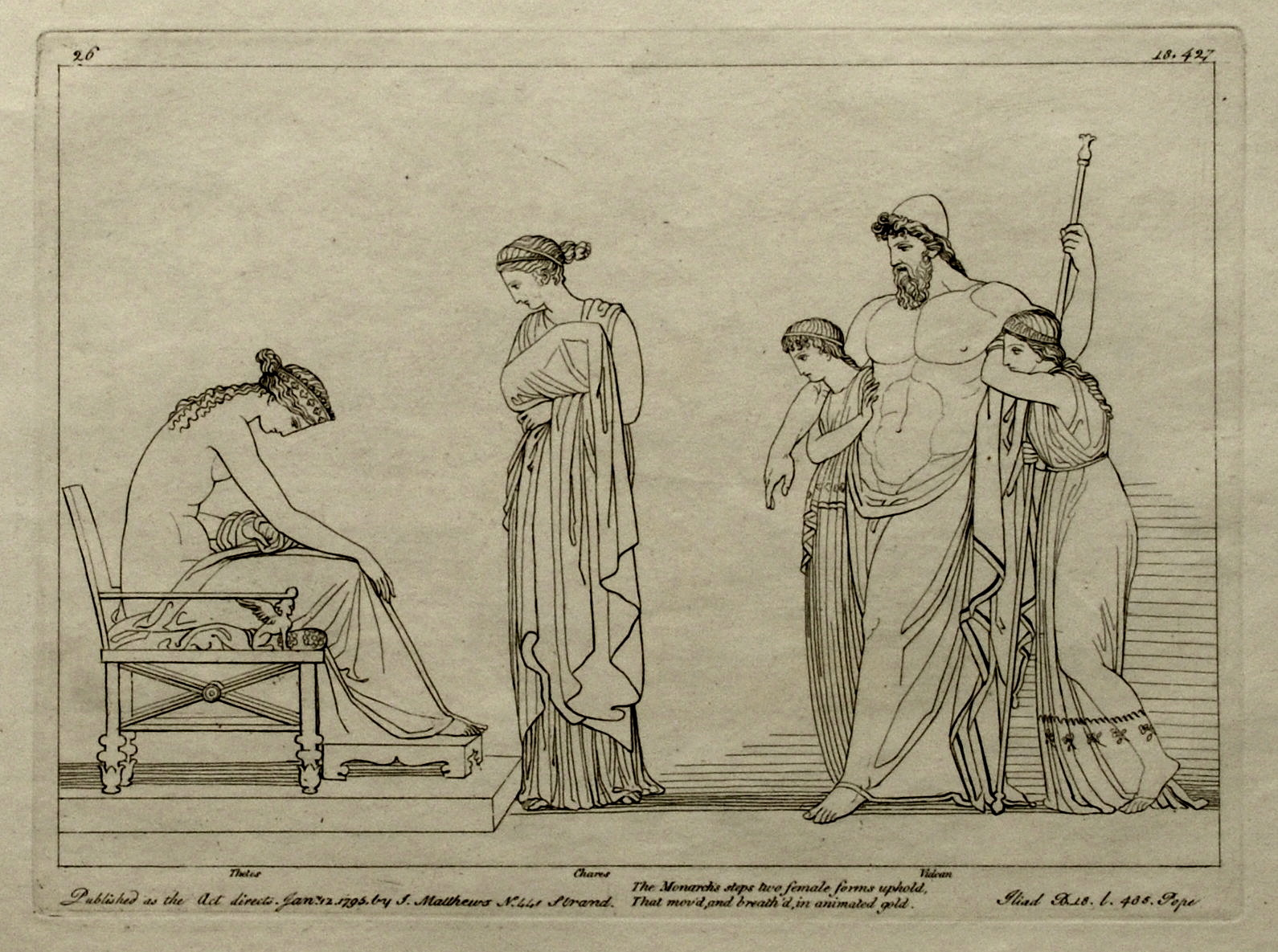
Charis (center), with Thetis and Hephaestus (labelled as Vulcan), in a 1795 engraving after a 1793 drawing by John Flaxman.

Charis (/ˈkærɪs/; Ancient Greek: Χάρις, or Kharis, "Grace"), is a goddess in Greek mythology. She is a member of the Charites (Ancient Greek: Χάριτες) — or Gratiae (Graces) in Roman mythology — who are goddesses of charm, beauty, nature, creativity and fertility. While the term Charis can refer to a member of this group generically, the name Charis is also used for specific goddesses in surviving sources.

== Mythology ==
Charis is the wife of Hephaestus, as described in Homer's Iliad (written ~8th century BCE), as well as in the later Dialogues of the Gods by Lucian (2nd century CE) and the Dionysiaca by Nonnus (5th century CE). In the Iliad, Charis lives with Hephaestus in a bronze-wrought home on Mount Olympus, into which she welcomes Thetis so that the latter may ask for Hephaestus to forge armor for her son Achilles.

This is not the only tradition of Hephaestus' spouse, however. In Homer's Odyssey, the poet Demodocus sings that Hephaestus was married to Aphrodite, whom he caught having an affair with Ares. Nonnus reconciles these by depicting Charis as the jealous bride of Hephaestus, whom he married after separating from Aphrodite. Lucian provides an alternative explanation in a dialogue between Apollo and Hermes, saying that Hephaestus is married to Aphrodite and Charis at the same time, one in Lemnos and one in Heaven (which way round is not stated), although this is before Hephaestus exposes Aphrodite's affair with Ares.

Hesiod names the member of the Charites who is married to Hephaestus as Aglaea, and some scholars conclude that references to Aglaea and Charis refer to the same goddess under different names. However, Aglaea appears in the Dionysiaca, and although she is referred to generically as "the Charis" when carrying out orders from Aphrodite, she also explicitly refers to Charis as a separate (and less loyal) attendant of Aphrodite when speaking to Eros.

The Dionysiaca refers to Charis several other times. Typhon refers to her—alongside Aphrodite (called by the epithets Cythereia and Paphian), Hera, Leto, Athena, Artemis, and Hebe—among goddesses that he expects to serve him after he conquers Zeus (which never happens). Harmonia, daughter of Aphrodite and Ares, is compared to Charis and referred to by that name by the Libyan army. Later, Charis herself accompanies Aphrodite when visiting Harmonia.
