= Thalia (Grace) =

One of the 3 Graces

- Member of The Charites
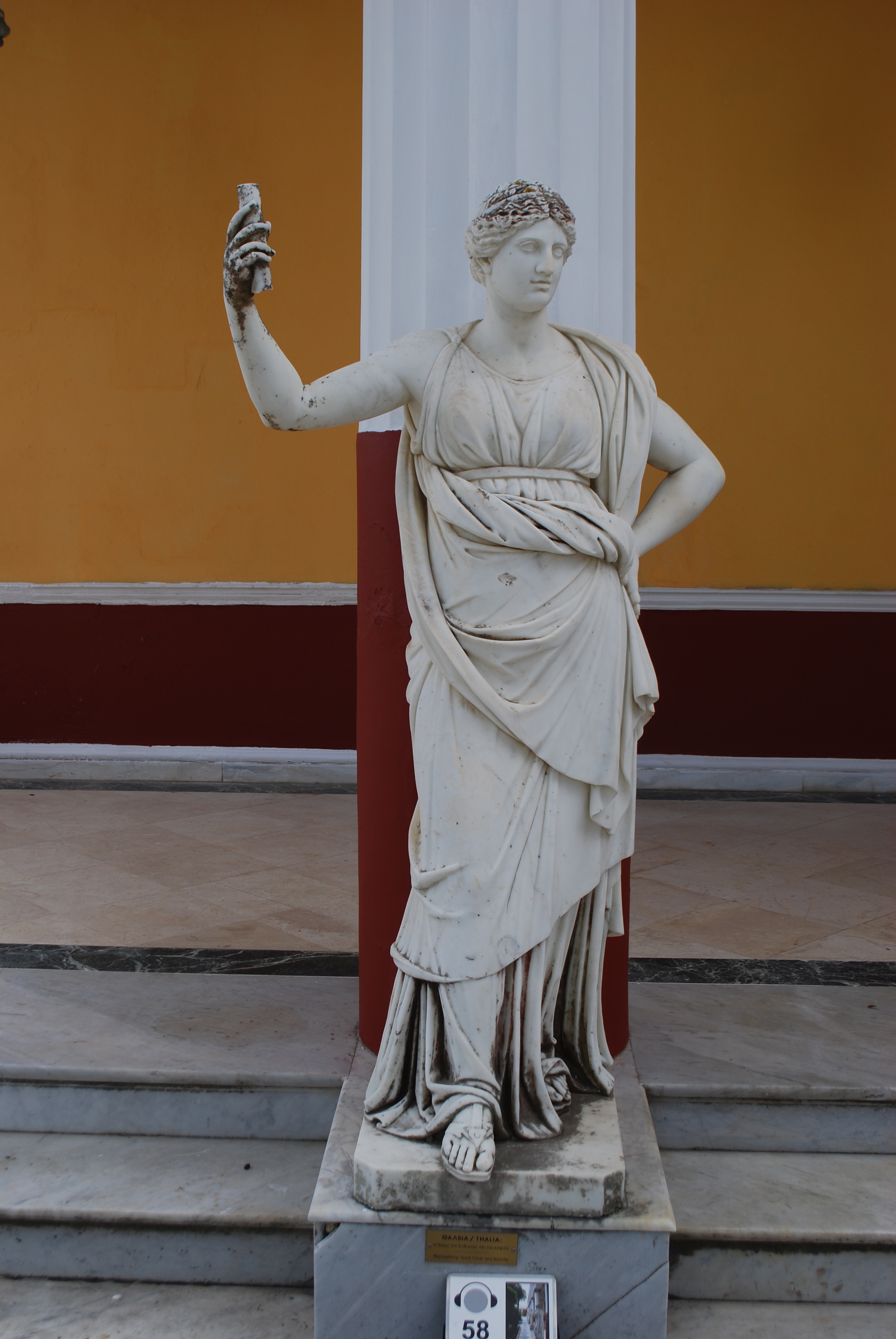
- A statue of Thalia in Achilleion palace, Corfu
- Major cult centre: Boeotia
- Abode: Mount Olympus

Genealogy
- Parents: Zeus and Eurynome
- Siblings: Euphrosyne and Aglaia

In Greek mythology, Thalia or Thaleia (/ˈθeɪliə/ or /θəˈlaɪə/; Ancient Greek: Θάλεια, romanized: Tháleia, lit. 'the joyous, the abundance') was one of the three Charites, along with her sisters Aglaia and Euphrosyne.

The Greek word thalia is an adjective applied to banquets, meaning rich, plentiful, luxuriant and abundant.

== Family ==
Typically, she was a daughter of Zeus and Oceanid Eurynome. Alternative parentage may be Zeus and Eurydome, Eurymedousa, or Euanthe; Dionysus and Koroneia; or Helios and the Naiad Aegle.

== In art ==
In art, she and her sisters were usually depicted dancing in a circle. Thalia was the goddess of festivity and rich banquets and was associated with Aphrodite, as part of her retinue.

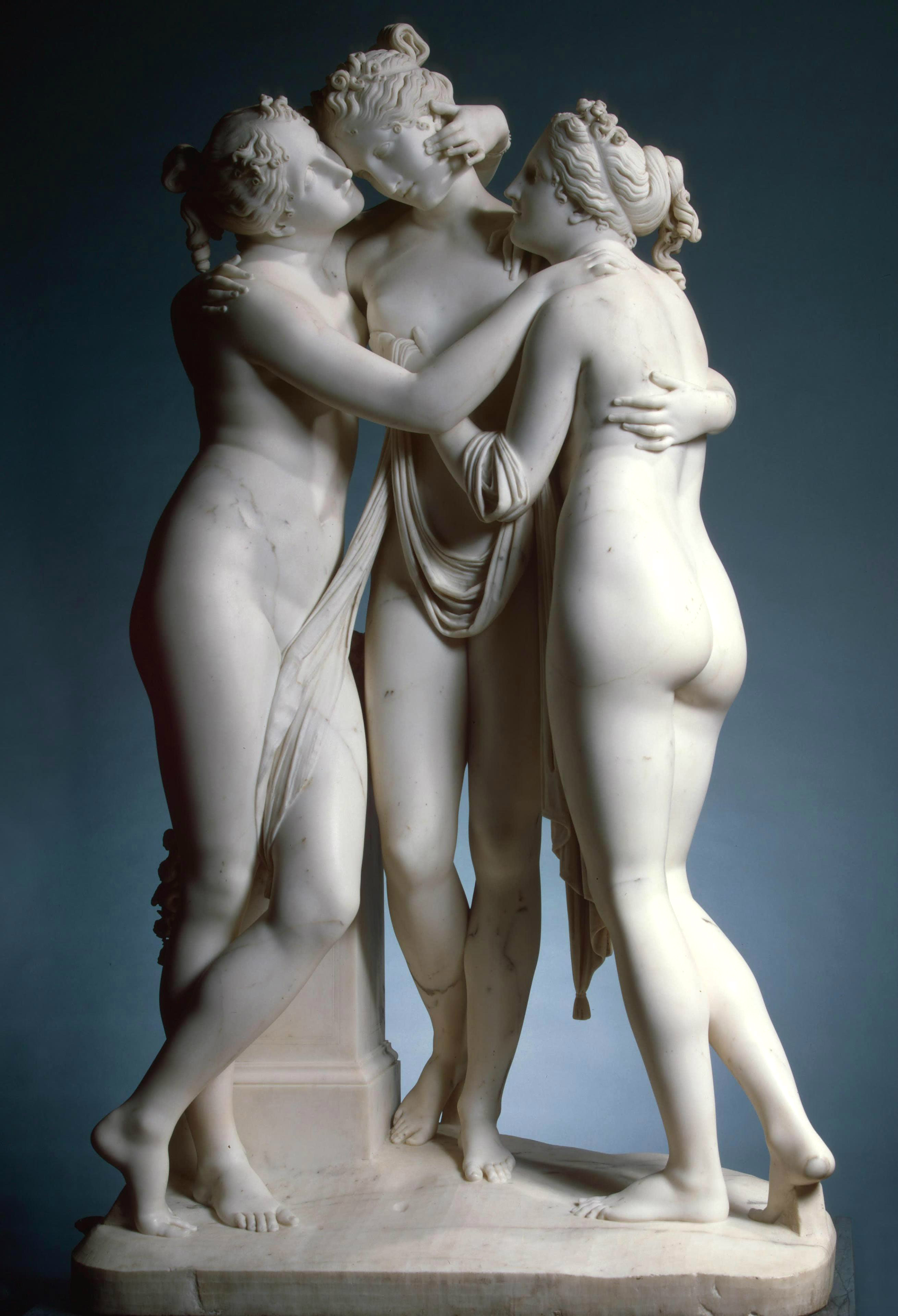
Thalia depicted with her sisters in Antonio Canova's sculpture The Three Graces
