= Euphrosyne =

Deity, one of the Graces

- Goddess of enthusiasm, joy and mirth
- Member of The Charites
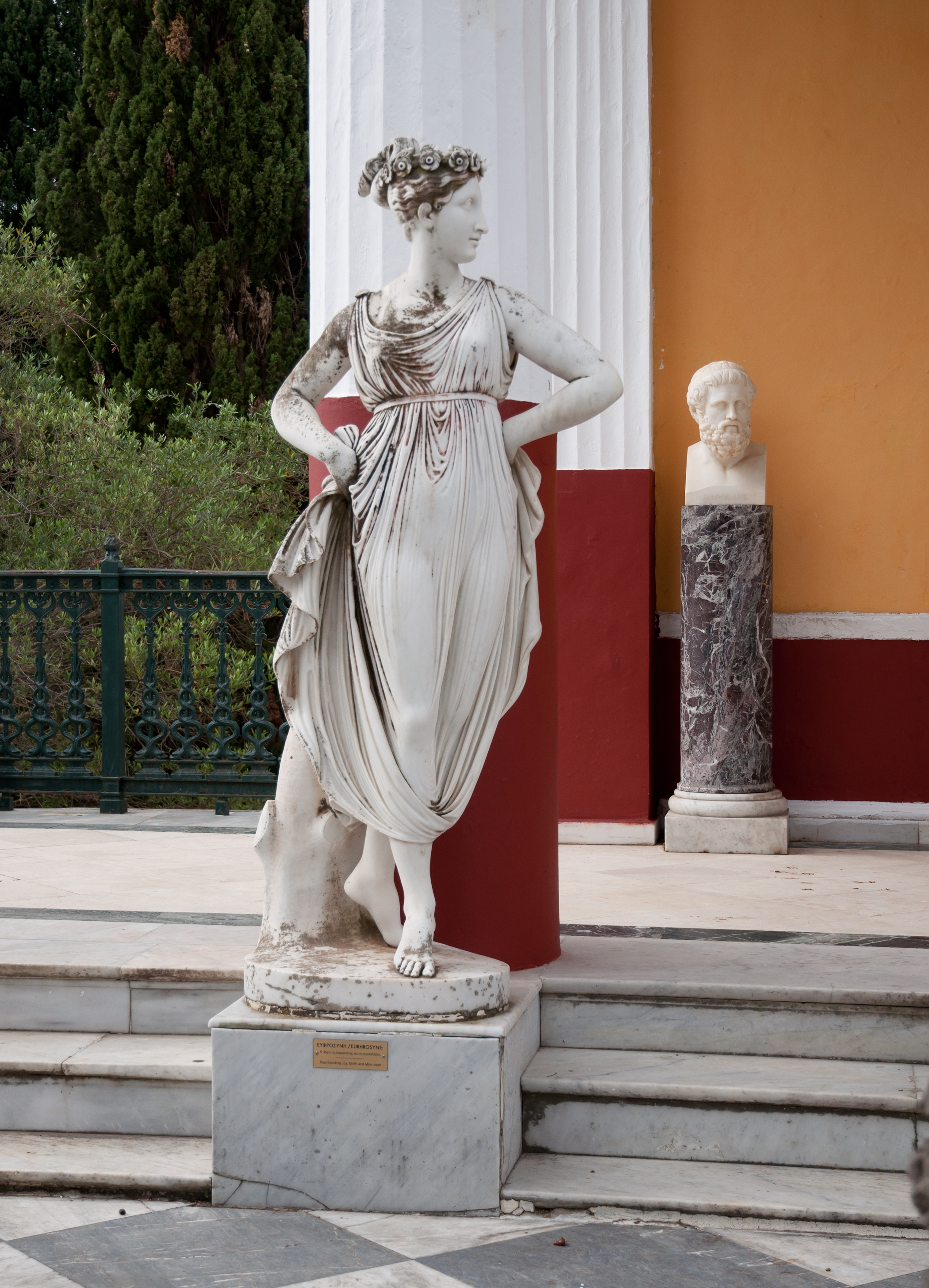
- A statue of Euphrosyne in Achilleion palace, Corfu.
- Affiliation: Aphrodite
- Major cult centre: Boeotia
- Abode: Mount Olympus
- Parents: Zeus and Eurynome; Erebus and Nyx

In ancient Greek religion and mythology, Euphrosyne (/juːˈfrɒzɪniː/; Ancient Greek: Εὐφροσύνη, romanized: Euphrosúnē) is a goddess, one of the three Charites. She was sometimes named Euthymia (Ancient Greek: Εὐθυμία, lit. 'good mood') or Eutychia (Ancient Greek: Εὐτυχία, lit. 'good luck').

== Family ==
According to Hesiod, Euphrosyne and her sisters Thalia and Aglaea are the daughters of Zeus and the Oceanid nymph Eurynome. Alternative parentage may be Zeus and Eurydome, Eurymedousa, or Euanthe; Dionysus and Coronis; or Helios and the Naiad Aegle.

The Roman author Hyginus, in his Fabulae, also mentions a figure named Euphrosyne, who is the daughter of Nox (Night) and Erebus (Darkness).

== Mythology ==
Euphrosyne is a goddess of good cheer, joy and mirth. Her name is the female version of the word euphrosynos, "merriment". Pindar wrote that these goddesses were created to fill the world with pleasant moments and good will. The Charites attended the goddess of beauty Aphrodite.

In art, Euphrosyne is usually depicted with her sisters dancing.

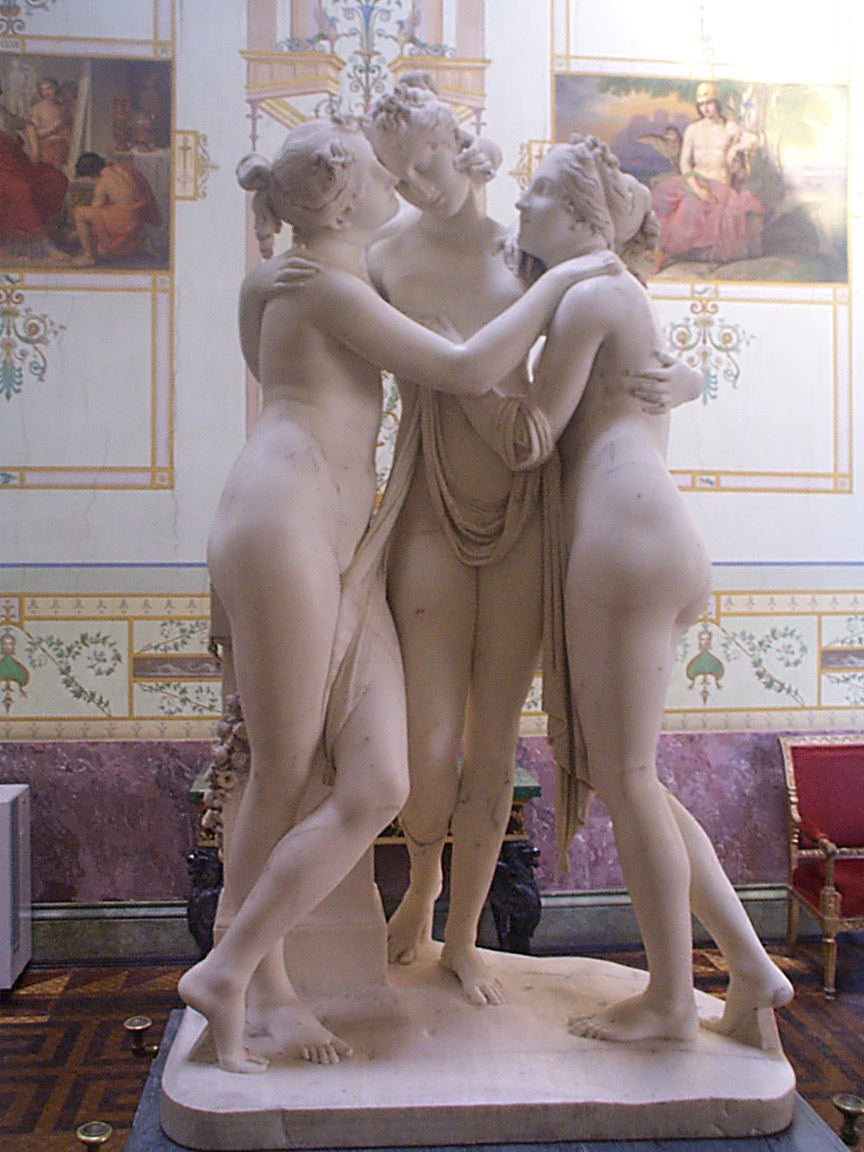
Euphrosyne (left) depicted with her sisters on The Three Graces sculpture at the Hermitage, Saint Petersburg, Russia

== Cults ==
Euphrosyne and her sisters' main cult was located in Athens, Sparta, or Boetia.

== Legacy ==
=== In art and literature ===
- Euphrosyne is depicted with the other two Graces, Aglaea and Thalia, at the left of the painting in Botticelli's Primavera. The sculptor Antonio Canova made a well-known piece in white marble representing the three Graces, in several copies including one for John Russell, 6th Duke of Bedford.
- Joshua Reynolds painted Mrs. Mary Hale, wife of General John Hale, as Euphrosyne in 1766.
- John Milton invoked her in the poem L'Allegro. She also has a singing part as the spirit of mirth in John Dalton and Thomas Arne's 1738 musical adaptation of Milton's Comus and speaks the epilogue.

=== In science ===
- The asteroid 31 Euphrosyne is named after the goddess.
