= Aglaia (Grace) =

Grace in Greek mythology

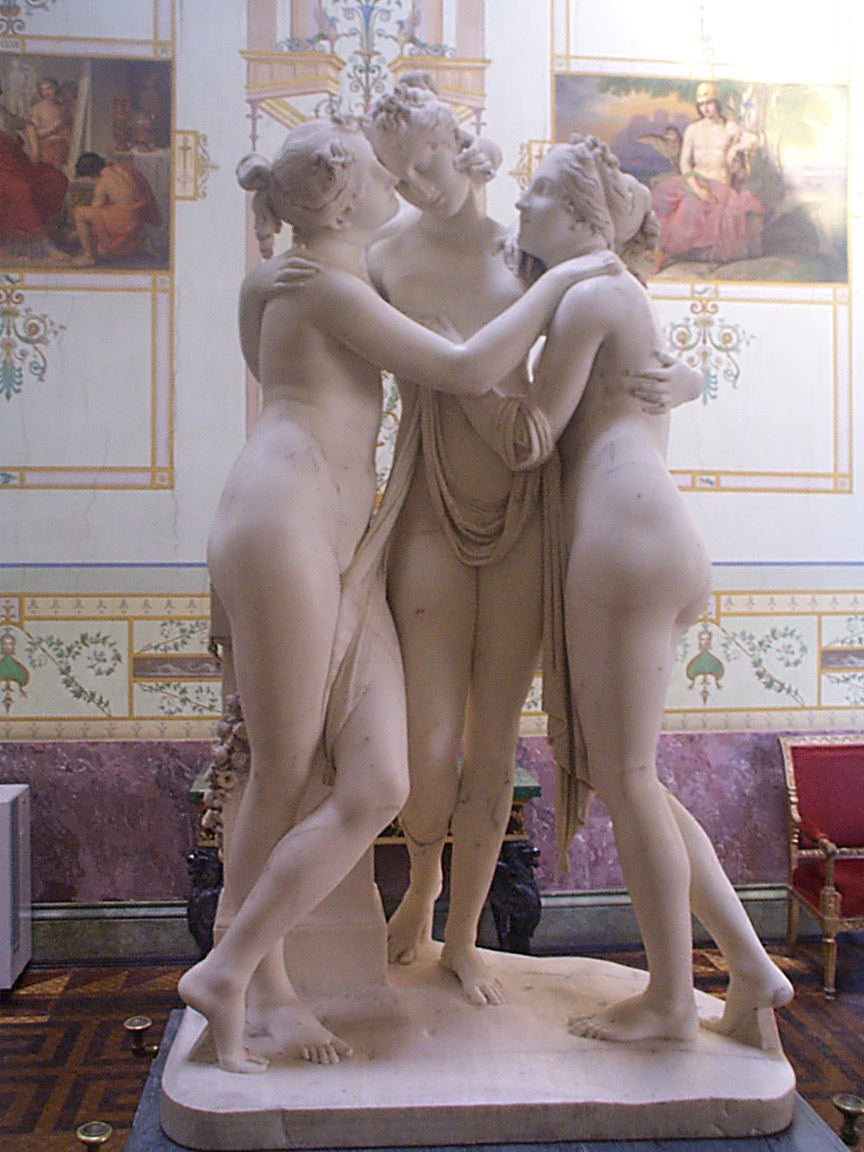
Aglaea (center), as depicted in Antonio Canova’s sculpture, The Three Graces.

In Greek mythology, Aglaia, Aglaïa (/əˈɡlaɪə/) or Aglaea (/əˈɡliːə/) (Ancient Greek: Ἀγλαΐα, romanized: Aglaiê, lit. 'festive radiance') is a goddess, one of the Charites (known as the Graces in Roman mythology). She is the goddess of splendor, brilliance and brightness.

== Family ==
According to Hesiod and other sources (including Apollodorus), Aglaia was one of the three Charites, along with Euphrosyne (mirth) and Thalia (abundance), who were the daughters of Zeus and the Oceanid Eurynome. Other sources name the same three Charites (Aglaia, Euphrosyne and Thalia) but give them different parents. The Orphic Hymn to the Graces says they are the daughters of Zeus and Eunomia (goddess of good order and lawful conduct), and Pindar says that they are daughters of the strongest god (i.e. Zeus) without naming their mother. Hesiod says also that Aglaia is the youngest of the Charites.

According to the Dionysiaca, Aglaia is one of the "dancers of Orchomenus" (i.e. the Charites, per Pindar), along with Pasithea and Peitho, who attend Aphrodite. When Aphrodite jealously attempts to weave better than Athena, the Charites help her do so, with Aglaia passing her the yarn. Aglaia also acts as Aphrodite's messenger, and is sent to find and bring a message to Eros, who travels back to Aphrodite much faster because he can fly whereas Aglaia cannot. Aglaia here is referred to as a Charis (singular of Charites), but other characters not of this group are also named Charis, including by Aglaia.

Hesiod says that Aglaia was married to Hephaestus. According to the fifth-century AD Greek Neoplatonist philosopher Proclus, by Hephaestus, Aglaea became the mother of Eucleia, Euthenia, Eupheme, and Philophrosyne. The Iliad and Dionysiaca refer to the wife of Hephaestus as Charis, and some scholars conclude that these references refer to Aglaia.
