= Charites =

Greek goddesses of grace and beauty

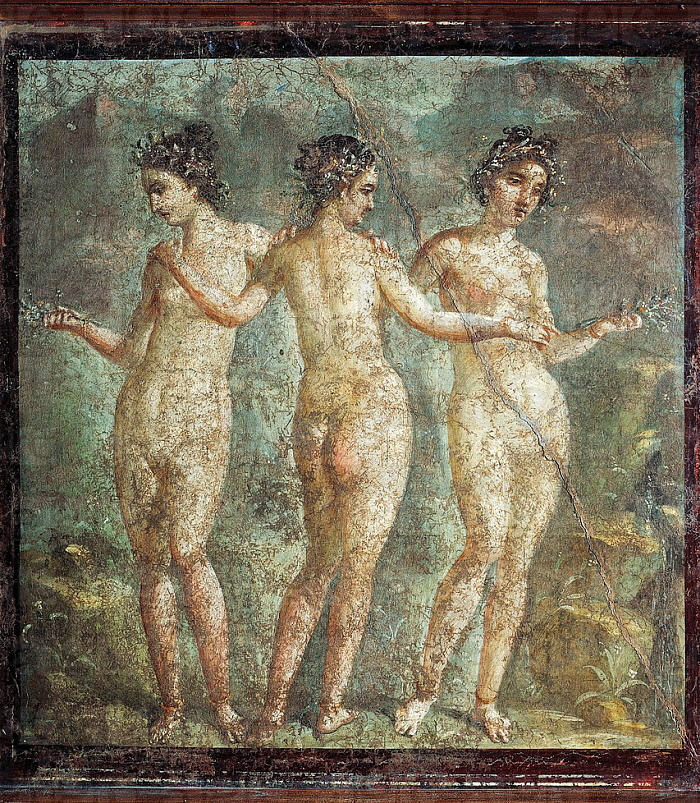
The Three Graces in a fresco at Pompeii, 1–50 AD

The Charites (/ˈkærɪtiːz/; Ancient Greek: Χάριτες; singular Charis (Χάρις), also called by the English translation the "Graces") are goddesses of Greek mythology who personify beauty and grace. According to Hesiod, their names were Aglaia, Euphrosyne, and Thalia and were the daughters of Zeus and Eurynome, the daughter of Oceanus. However, their names, number and parentage varied across accounts. They have little independent mythology, and are usually described as attending various gods and goddesses, particularly Aphrodite.

In Roman mythology, they were known by the Latin equivalent of the Greek: the Gratiae. In Roman and later art, they were generally depicted nude in an interlaced group, but during the Greek Archaic and Classical periods, they were typically depicted as fully clothed, in a line, and in dance poses.

== Parentage, number, and names ==
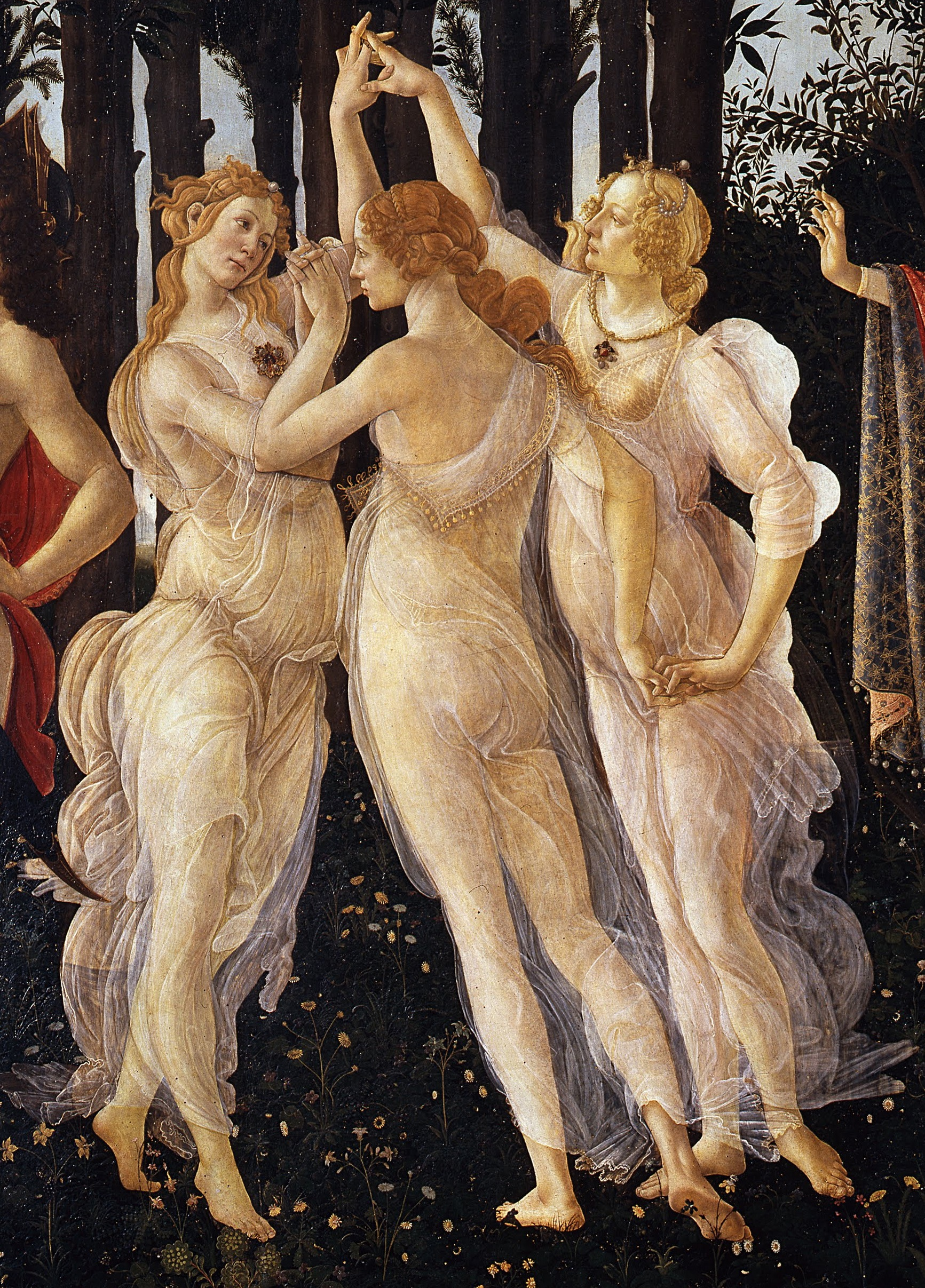
The Three Graces, from Sandro Botticelli's painting Primavera in the Uffizi Gallery.

In Hesiod's Theogony, the Charites are the three daughters of Zeus: Aglaia ("Splendor"), Euphrosyne ("Joy"), and Thalia ("Good Cheer"), by the Oceanid Eurynome (also called Hermione). The identical genealogy is given by Apollodorus. The same three names are also given by Pindar, with a possible reference to their "father" Zeus and no mother mentioned. Although the Charites were usually considered to be Zeus' daughters and three in number, their names as well as their parentage and number varied. Homer mentions Pasithea as "one of the youthful Graces", and perhaps has "Charis" (the singular form of "Charites"), as the name of another, but does not give their parentage, number, or any other of their names.

The geographer Pausanias gives other variations, some regional. He says that, according to Boeotian tradition, Eteocles, the king of Orchomenus, established three as the number of Charites, but that the Athenians and Spartans worshipped only two. For the Athenians the two Charites were Auxo and Hegemone, while for the Spartans they were Cleta and Phaenna. Also, according to Pausanias, the Hellenistic poet Hermesianax said that Peitho ("Persuasion") was one of the Charites, and the poet Antimachus said that the Charites were the "daughters of Aegle and the Sun [Helios]", but notes that Antimachus did not mention their number and names.

While Hesiod has Eurynome, and Antimachus has Aegle, as the mother of the Charites, other names were also given. According to Orphic Hymn 60, the Charites ("Aglaea, Thalia, ... Euphrosyne") were the daughters of Zeus and Eunomia. The Stoic philosopher Cornutus includes the names Eurynome, and Aegle, he gives other names for mothers as well: Eurydome, Eurymedousa, Hera, and Euanthe. Nonnus has his three Charites (Hesiod's Aglaia, Homer's Pasithea, and Hermesianax's Peitho) being the daughters of Dionysus and Coronis.

A purported summary of a lost poem by an otherwise unknown poet "Sostratus", while naming the three Charites, adds to Homer's Pasithea, and Hesiod's Euphrosyne, the name Kale, saying that it was she who was the wife of Hephaestus.

== Mythology ==
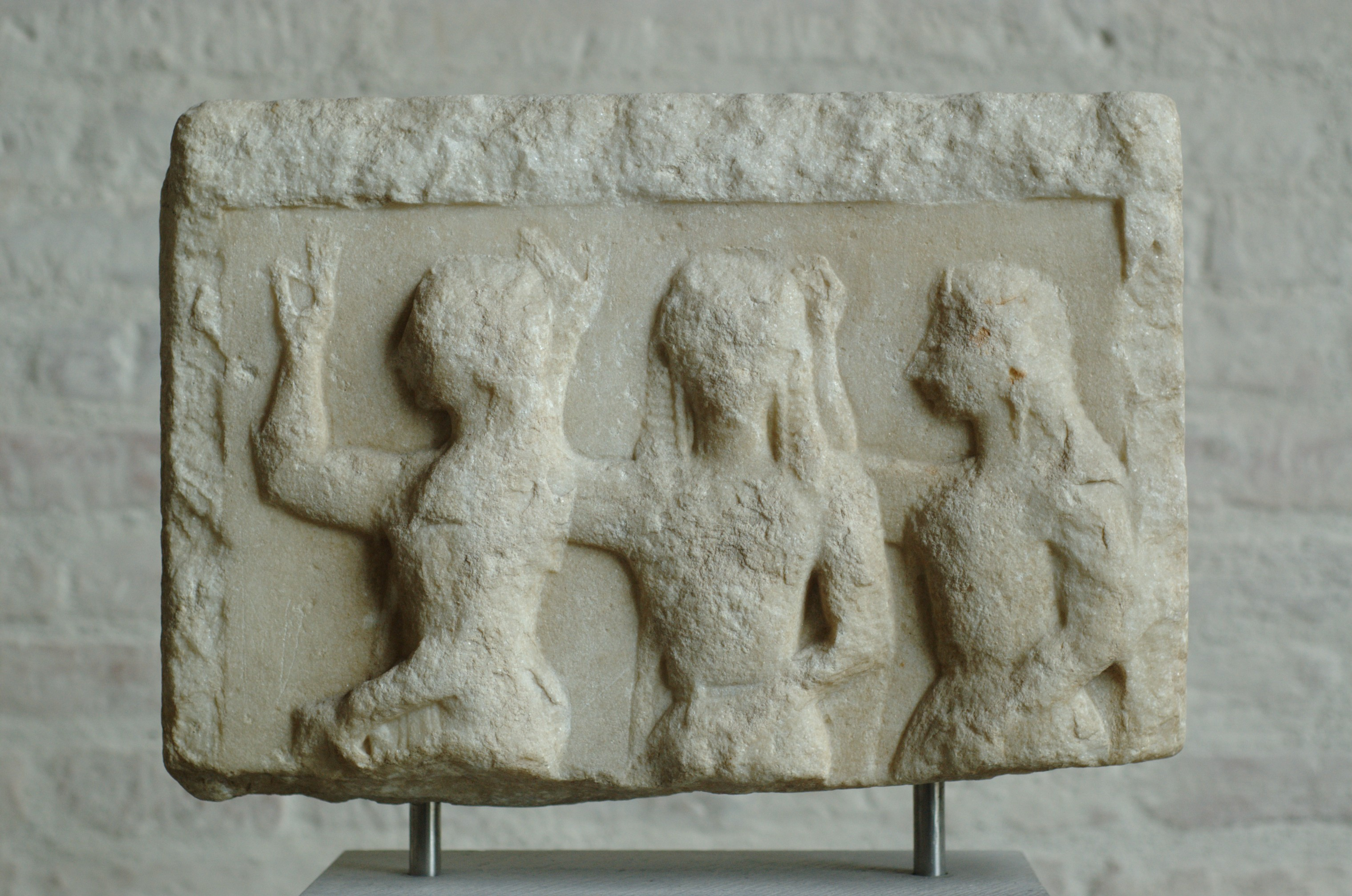
6th-century BCE relief

The Charites' major mythological role was to attend the other Olympians, particularly during feasts and dances. They attended Aphrodite by bathing and anointing her in Paphos before her seduction of Ankhises and after she left Olympus when her affair with Ares was found out. Additionally, they were said to weave or dye her peplos. Along with Peitho, they presented Pandora with necklaces to make her more enticing. Pindar stated the Charites arranged feasts and dances for the Olympians. They also danced with the Seasons, Hebe, Harmonia and Aphrodite in celebration of the arrival of Apollo among the gods of Olympus, while Artemis sang and Apollo played the lyre. They were often referenced as dancing and singing with Apollo and the Muses. Pindar also referred to them as the guardians of the ancient Minyans and the queens of Orchomenus who have their thrones beside Pythian Apollo's.

The Charites appear to have a connection to Hera, where some ancient authors reference her as their nurse. In the Iliad, as part of her plan to seduce Zeus to distract him from the Trojan War, she offers to arrange Hypnos's marriage to Pasithea, who is referred to as one of the younger Charites.

One of the Charites had a role as the wife of the smith god Hephaestus. Hesiod names the wife of Hephaestus as Aglaia. In the Iliad, she is called Charis, and she welcomes Thetis into their shared home on Olympus so that the latter may ask for Hephaestus to forge armor for her son Achilles. Some scholars have interpreted this marriage as occurring after Hephaestus's divorce from Aphrodite due to her affair with Ares being exposed. Notably, however, some scholars, such as Walter Burkert, support that the marriage of Hephaestus and Aphrodite as an invention of the Odyssey, since it is not represented within other Archaic or Classical era literature or arts, and it does not appear to have a connection to cult.

== Cult ==
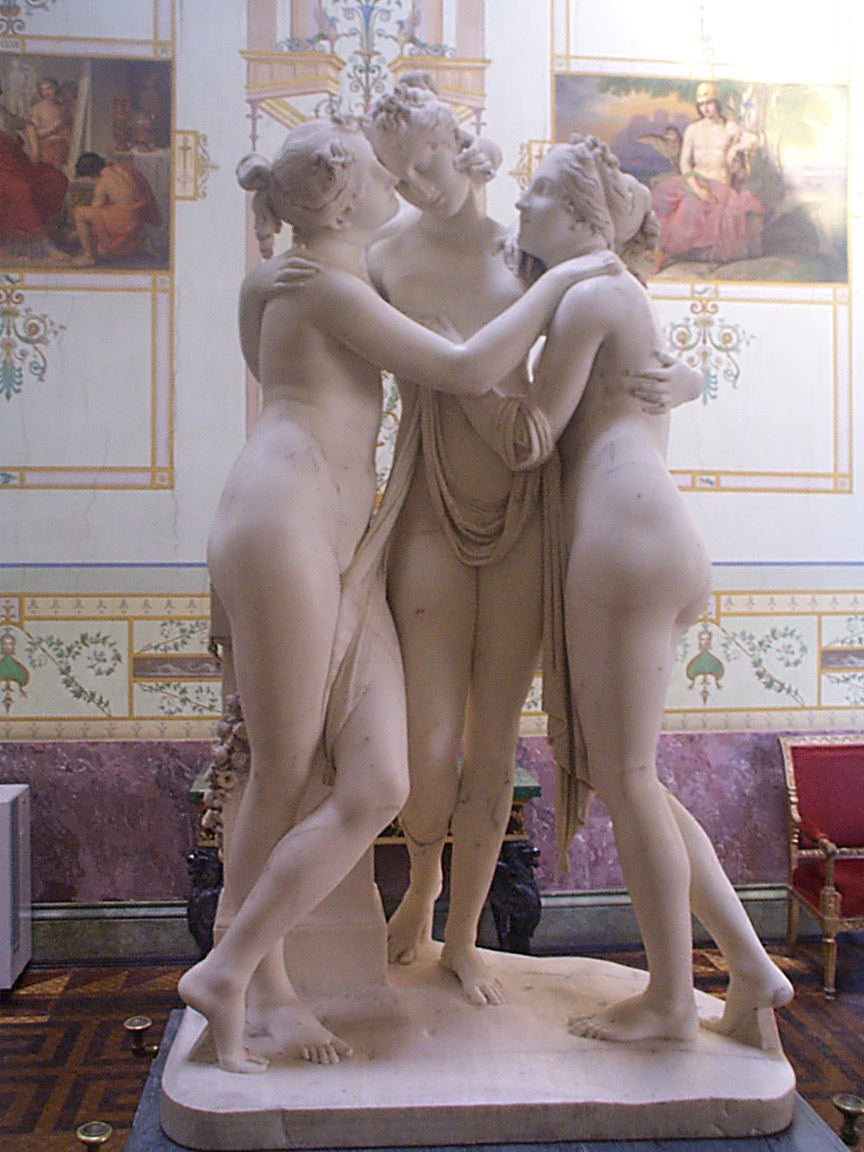
The Three Graces, Antonio Canova's first version, now in the Hermitage Museum

The cult of the Charites is very old, with their name appearing to be of Pelasgian, or pre-Greek, origin rather than being brought to Greece by Proto-Indo-Europeans. The purpose of their cult appears to be similar to that of nymphs, primarily based around fertility and nature with a particular connection to springs and rivers. One of the earliest centres of worship for the Charites was the Cycladic Islands including Paros, with epigraphical evidence for a cult to the Charites dating to the sixth century B.C.E. on the island of Thera. Scholars have interpreted them as chthonic deities connected to fertility due to the absence of wreaths and flutes in ceremonies. An aetiological explanation for the lack of music and garlands was from a myth involving Minos. He was said to have been sacrificing to the Charites on the island of Paros when he learned of his son's death in Athens and stopped the music and ripped off his garlands in grief. Dance, however, appears to be strongly connected with their cult, which is similar to the cults of Dionysus and Artemis.

Although the Charites were most commonly depicted in the sanctuaries of other gods, there were at least four temples exclusively dedicated to them in Greece. The temple regarded as their perhaps most important was that in Orkhomenos in Boeotia, where their cult was thought to have originated. There were also temples to the Charites in Hermione, Sparta, and Elis. A temple was dedicated to the Charites near the Tiasa river in Amyclae, Laconia that was reportedly founded by the ancient King of Sparta, Lacedaemon.

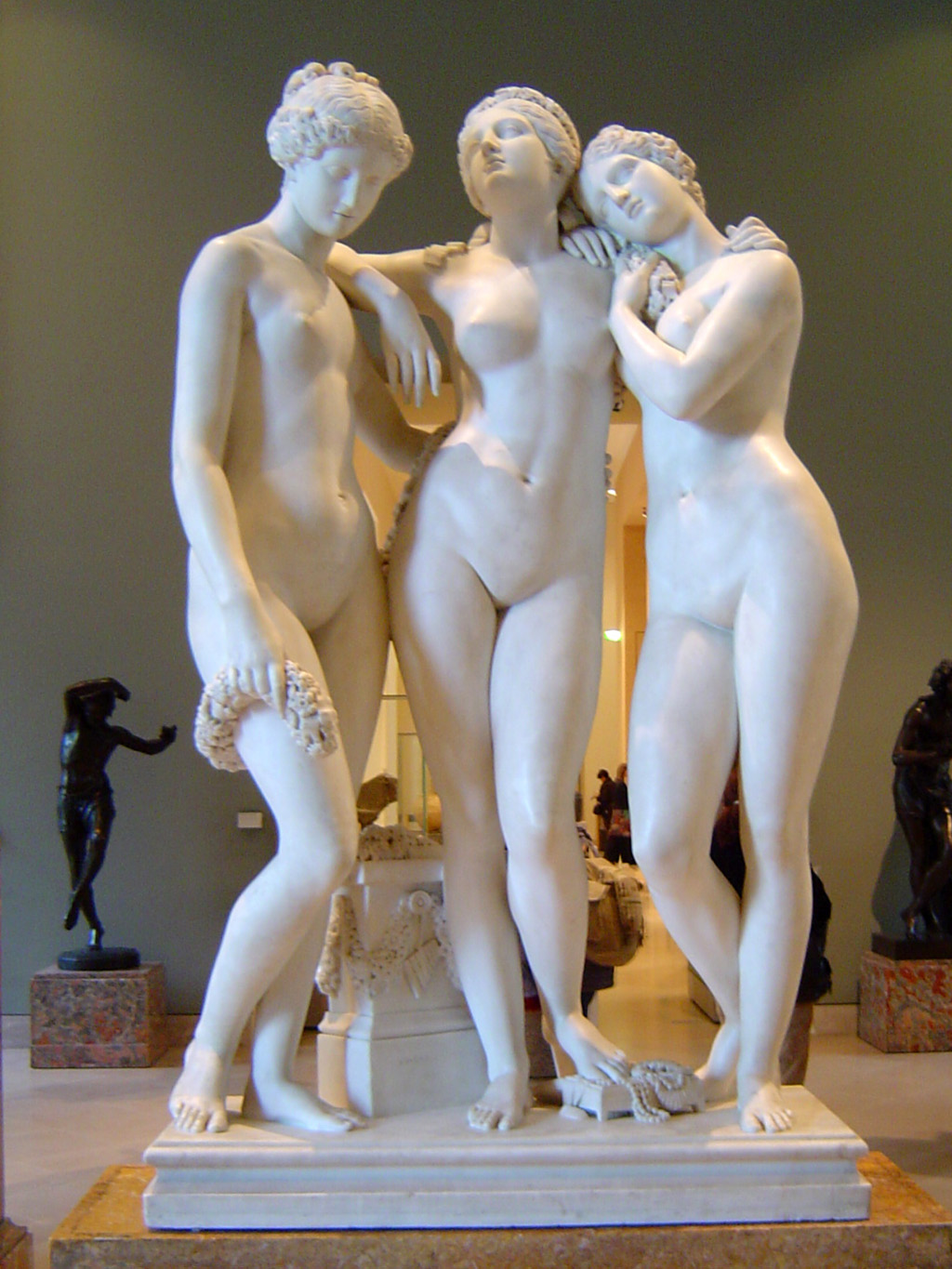
Les Trois Grâces by James Pradier, 1831. Louvre.

In Orkhomenos, the goddesses were worshipped at a very ancient site with a trio of stones, which is similar to other Boiotian cults to Eros and Herakles. The local river Kephisos and the Akidalia (or Argaphia) spring was sacred to the three goddesses. Orkhomenos was an agriculturally prosperous city because of the marshy Kopaic plain, and the Charites were offered a portion of the produce. Regarding the foundation of their cult in Orkhomenos, Strabo wrote:

Eteokles, one of those who reigned as king at Orkhomenos, who founded a temple of the Kharites, was the first to display both wealth and power; for he honored these goddesses either because he was successful in receiving graces, or in giving them, or both. For necessarily, when he had become naturally inclined to kindly deeds, he began doing honor to these goddesses; and therefore he already possessed this power.

In cult, the Charites were particularly connected with Apollo and appear to be connected to his cult on Delos; however, this connection is not present in other cults to Apollo. In the Classical era and beyond, the Charites were associated with Aphrodite in connection to civic matters.

There was a festival in honour of the Charites which was called Charisia (Χαρίσια). During this festival there were dances all night and at the end a cake was given to those who remained awake during the whole time.

== Visual art ==
=== Ancient art ===
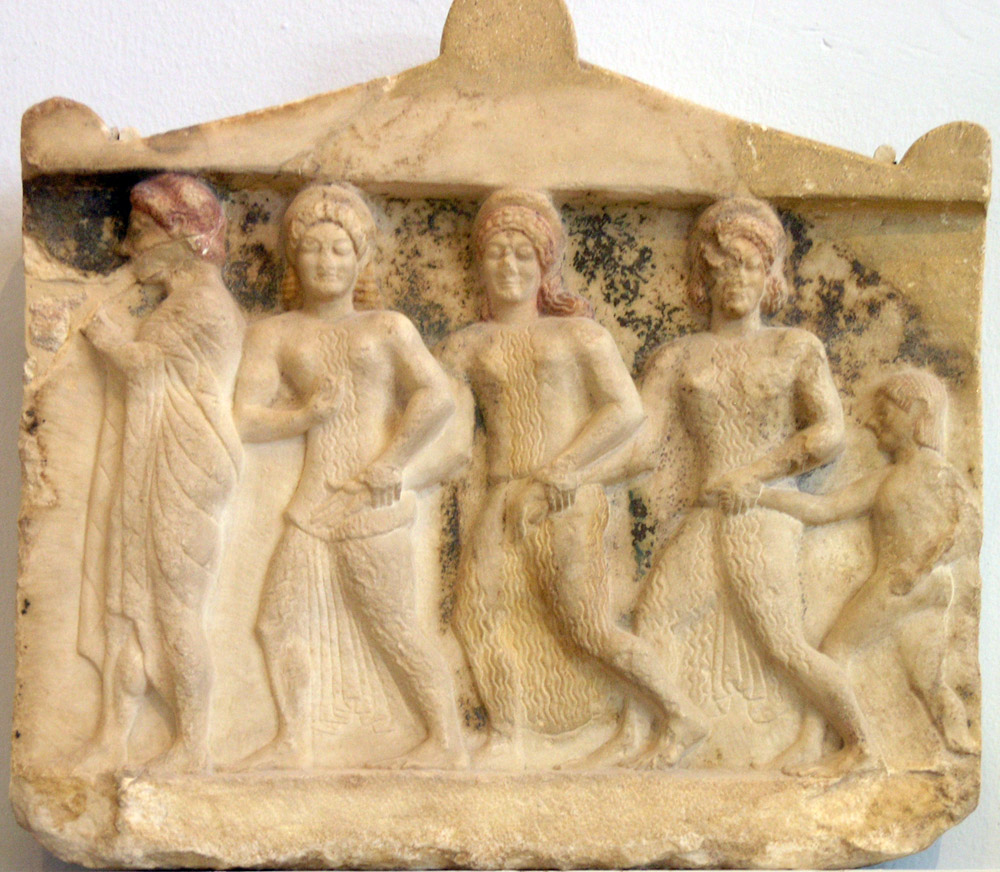
Early 5th-century BCE relief from the acropolis of Athens; Ancient folklore held that it was sculpted by Socrates, though this is unlikely.

Despite the Charites usually being depicted nude entwined in a "closed symmetrical group" for the last two millennia, this was a later development, as in depictions from Archaic and Classical Greece, they are finely dressed, and usually shown in a line, as dancers. In contrast, the third century BCE poets Callimachus and Euphorion describe the trio as being nude.

The earliest representation of these goddesses was found in a temple of Apollo in Thermon dated to the seventh to sixth century BCE. It is possible, however, that the Charites are represented on a Mycenean golden seal ring that depicts two female figures dancing in the presence of a male figure, who has been interpreted as Hermes or Dionysus. Another early representation of the Charites, from a relief at the Paros colony of Thasos dated to the beginning of the fifth century BCE, shows the Charites with Hermes and either Aphrodite or Peitho, which marked the entrance to the old city. The opposite side of the relief shows Apollo being crowned by Artemis with nymphs in the background. At the entrance of the Akropolis, there was a famous Classical era relief of the Charites and Hermes, and the popular belief was that the sculptor was Socrates, although this is very unlikely.

Kenneth Clark describes the "complicated" pose of the Three Graces facing inwards with interlaced arms as "one of the last beautiful inventions of antique art". He thought it was invented in the 1st century BCE, based on the proportions of the figures, and notes that none of the many survivals from antiquity are of "high quality". The opportunity for artists to show their skill in representing figures with three nude female figures seen from different angles has been a factor in the enduring popularity of the subject.

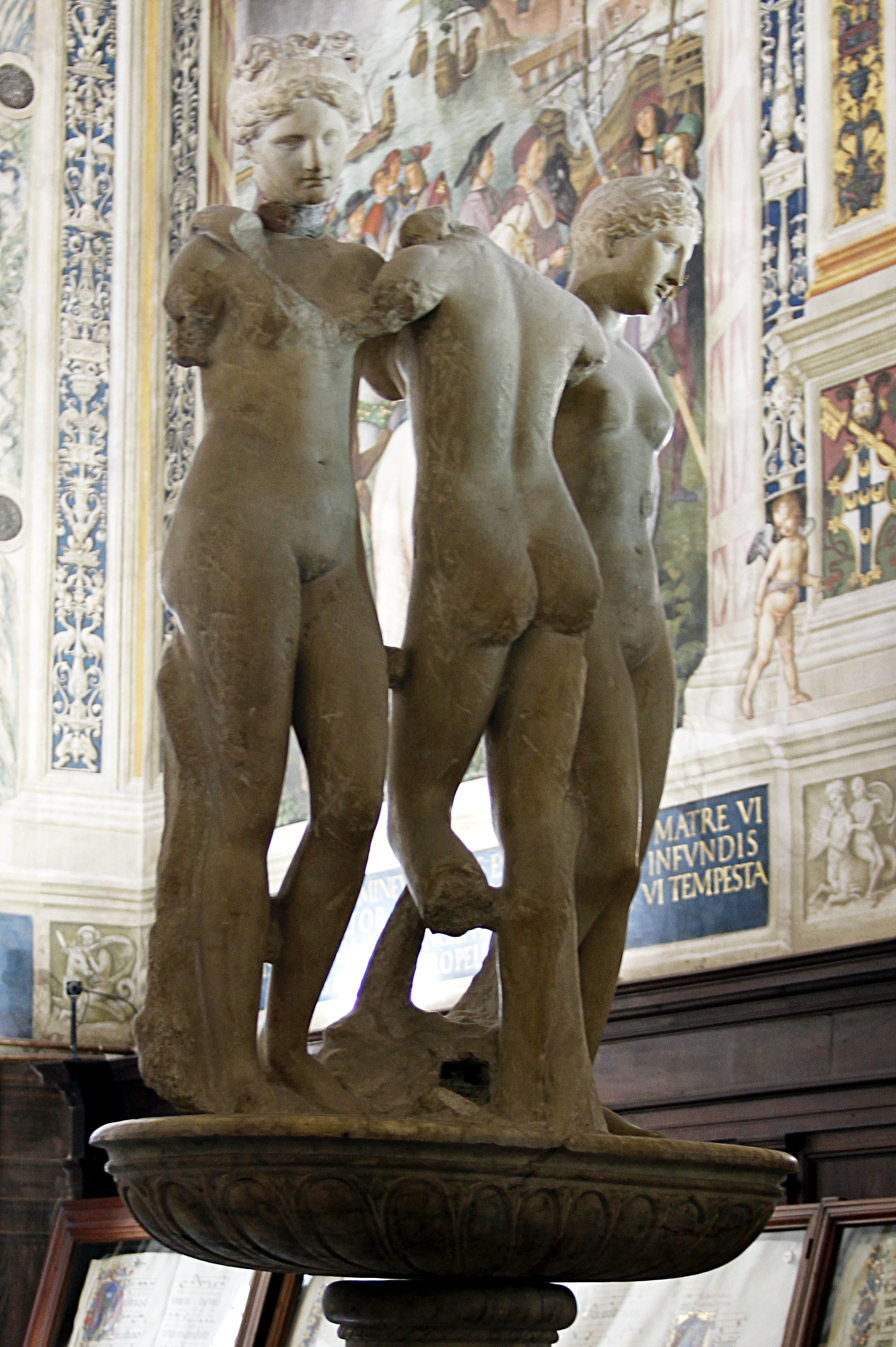
The Three Graces from the Piccolomini Library, now in Siena Cathedral

One of the earliest known Roman representations of the Graces was a wall painting in Boscoreale dated to 40 BCE, which also depicted Aphrodite with Eros and Dionysus with Ariadne. The group may have also appeared on a small number of coins to symbolize the union between Marcus Aurelius and Faustina Minor and on other coins they were depicted in the hands of Juno or Venus. The Graces were common subject matter on Roman sarcophagi, and they were depicted on several mirrors. On the representation of the Graces, the second century CE guide book author Pausanias wrote:

Who it was who first represented the Graces naked, whether in sculpture or in painting, I could not discover. During the earlier period, certainly, sculptors and painters alike represented them draped. At Smyrna, for instance, in the sanctuary of the Nemeses, above the images have been dedicated Graces of gold, the work of Bupalus; and in the Music Hall in the same city there is a portrait of a Grace, painted by Apelles. At Pergamus likewise, in the chamber of Attalus, are other images of Graces made by Bupalus; and near what is called the Pythium there is a portrait of Graces, painted by Pythagoras the Parian. Socrates too, son of Sophroniscus, made images of Graces for the Athenians, which are before the entrance to the Acropolis. Also, Socrates was known to have destroyed his own work as he progressed deeper into his life of philosophy and search of the conscious due to his iconoclastic attitude towards art and the like. All these are alike draped; but later artists, I do not know the reason, have changed the way of portraying them. Certainly to-day sculptors and painters represent Graces naked.

=== Renaissance onwards ===
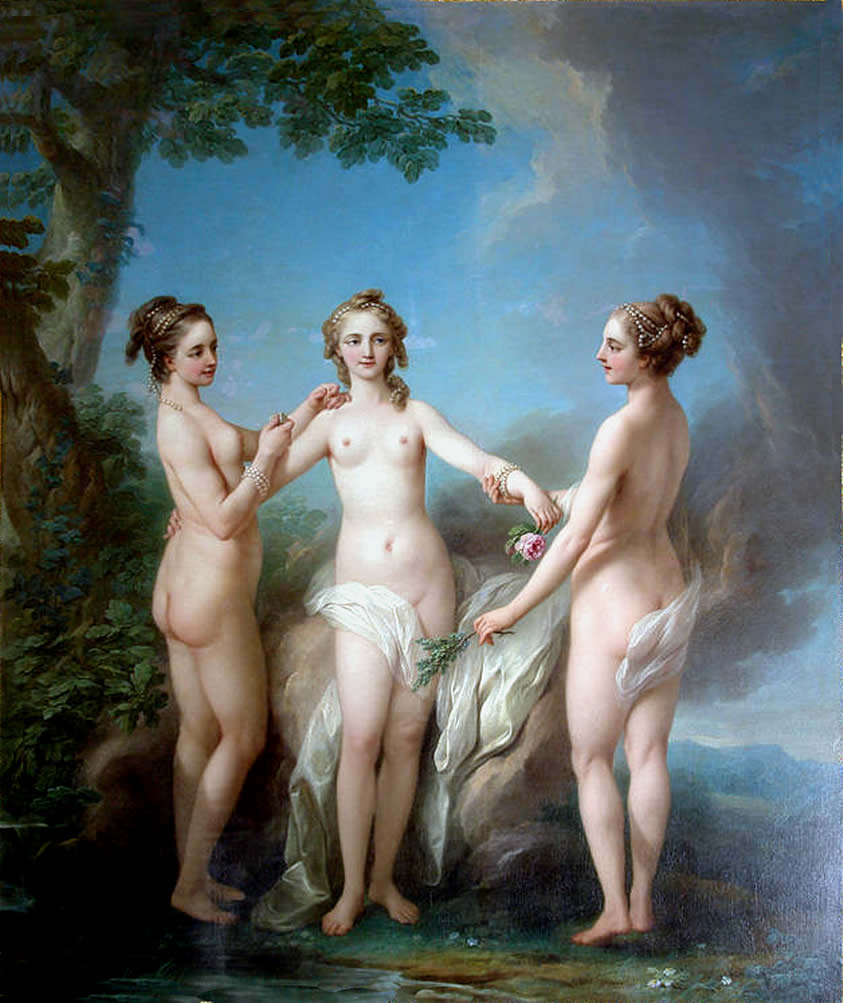
The Three Graces by Carle van Loo (1765)

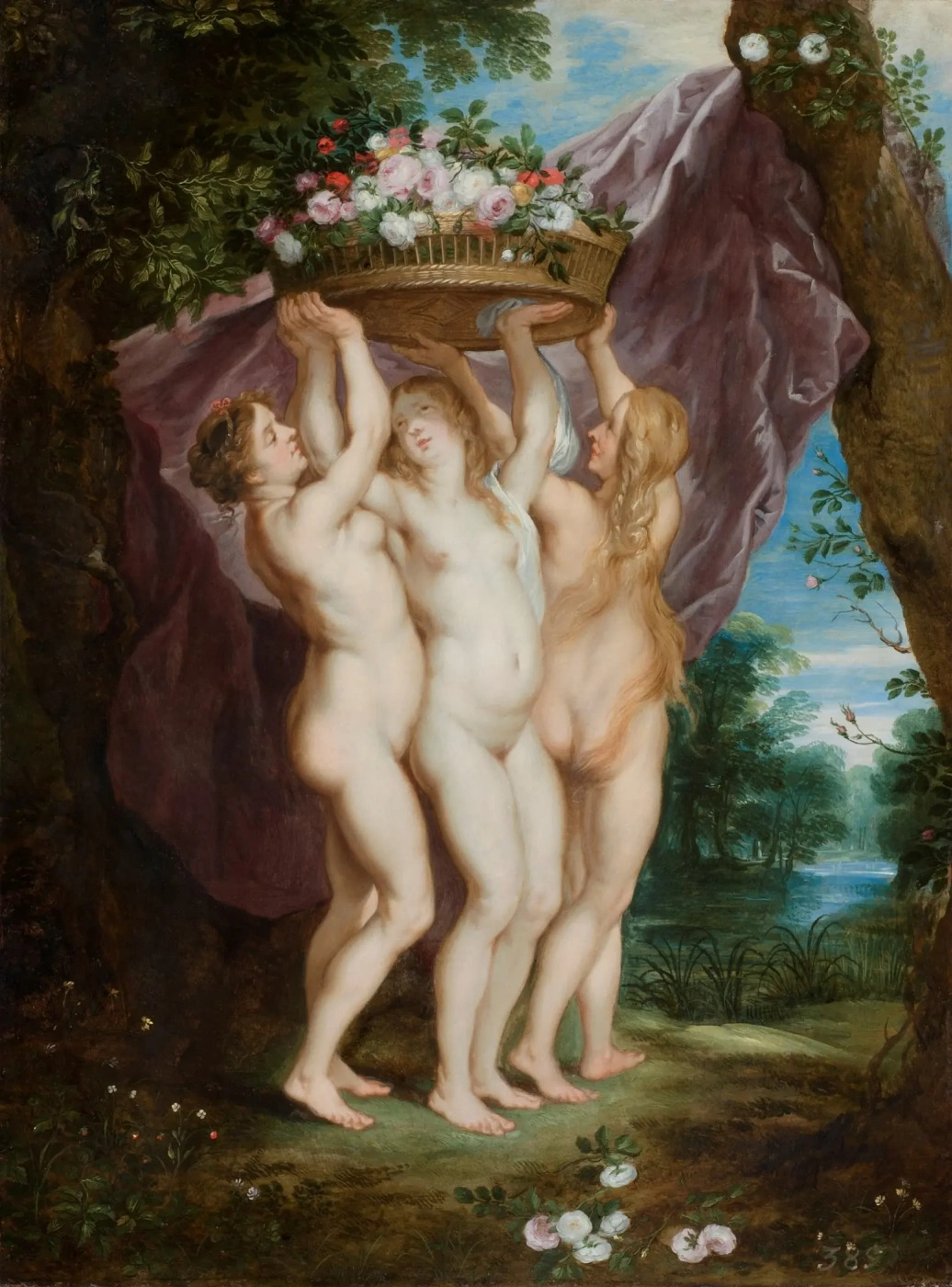
The Three Graces by Jan Brueghel the Younger (1635)

Clark writes that "For some reason the nakedness of the Graces was free from moral opprobium, and in consequence they furnished the subject through which pagan beauty was first allowed to appear in the 15th century". Indeed, a large marble Graeco-Roman group, which was a key model in the Renaissance, when it was in the Piccolomini Library, is now displayed in Siena Cathedral.

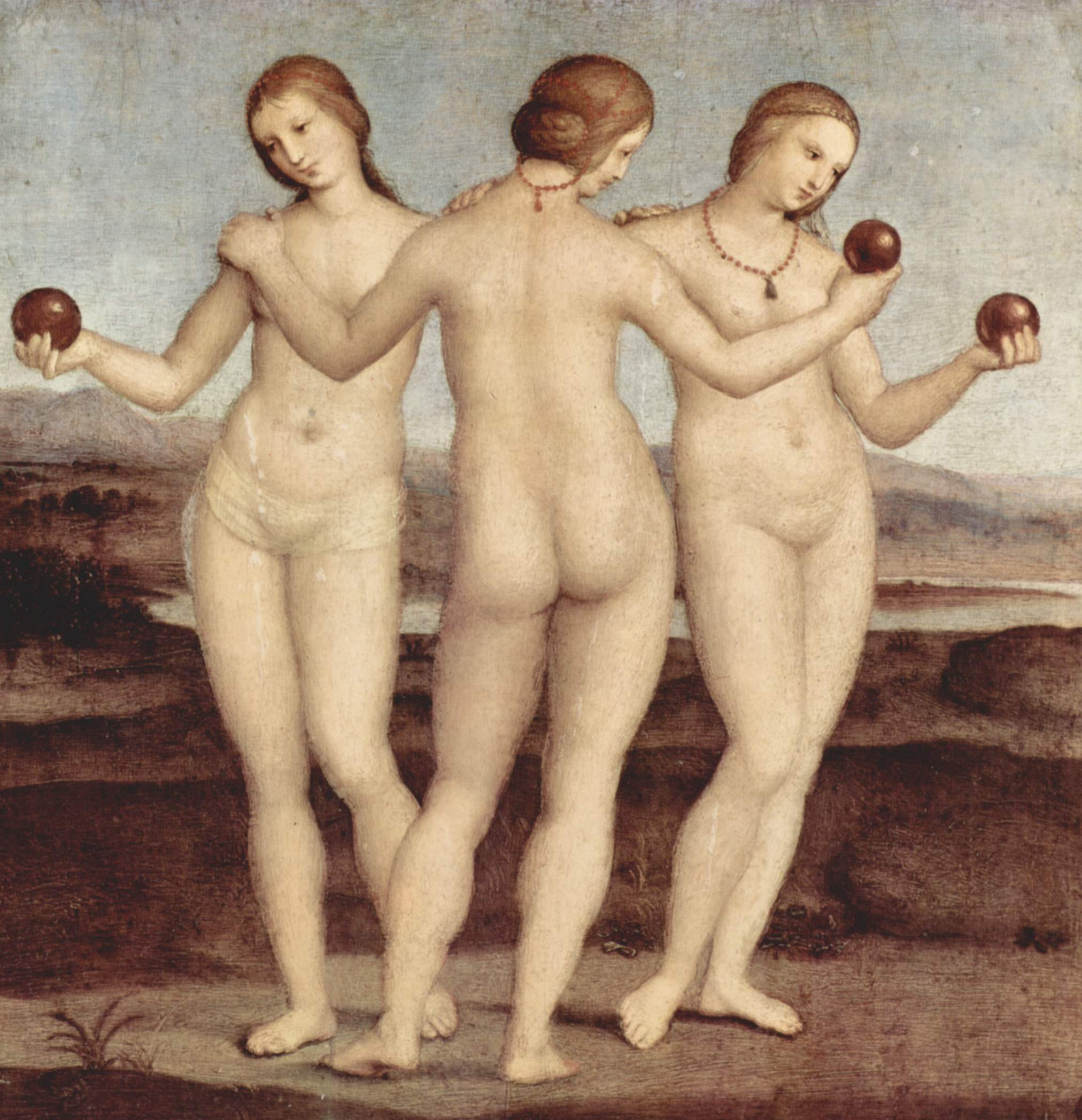
The Three Graces by Raphael, 1504–1505.

The Charites are depicted together with several other mythological figures in Sandro Botticelli's painting Primavera. Raphael also pictured them in a small painting now in the Musée Condé (Chantilly, France). Among other artistic depictions, they are the subject of famous sculptures by Antonio Canova and Bertel Thorvaldsen. The vast majority use a variant of the closed group pose.

A group of three trees in the Calaveras Big Trees State Park are named "The Three Graces" after the Charites.

=== List of notable artworks with images resembling the three Charites ===
- Anonymous
- Anonymous
- Jean Arp (16 September 1886 – 7 June 1966) The Three Graces (1961)
- Francesco Bartolozzi
- Jacques Blanchard (1631–33) Man surprising Sleeping Venus and Graces
- Giulio di Antonio Bonasone
- Sandro Botticelli (1482); detail of Primavera;
- Marie Bracquemond (1880) Trois femmes aux ombrelles
- Antonio Canova (1799) The Three Graces
- Agostino Carracci
- Paul Cézanne
- Antonio da Correggio (1518);
- Francesco del Cossa, Allegory of April, Palazzo Schifanoia, School of Ferrara.
- Maurice Raphael Drouart
- Ewen Feuillâtre The Three Graces : Aglaea, Euphrosyne & Thalia (2020)
- Hans Baldung Grien (1540)
- Ludwig Von Hofmann
- Laura Knight
- Jean-Baptiste van Loo (1684–1745) at the Château de Chenonceau
- Ambrogio Lorenzetti (1348–50) Allegory of Good Government
- Aristide Maillol, Les Trois Nymphes (1930-1937)
- Jacob Matham
- Arthur Frank Mathews
- Henry Moore, Three Standing Figures (1947)
- Bruce Peebles & Co. advertisement (c. 1900)
- Eduard Zimmermann, "Fountain of the Three Graces" (Drei Grazien Brunnen) in the ETH Zurich main building (1921).
- Pablo Picasso The Three Graces (1925)
- Germain Pilon
- Jacopo Pontormo (1535)
- James Pradier (1831) Les Trois Grâces
- Jean-Baptiste Regnault Les Trois Grâces (1797–1798)
- Peter Paul Rubens
- Raphael Sanzio
- Anna Soghomonyan, Three Graces (2020)
- Cosimo Tura (1476–84) detail of Allegory of April
- Unknown artist, The Three Graces sculpture in Indianapolis
- Kehinde Wiley Three Graces
- Joel-Peter Witkin

== See also ==
- 627 Charis
- Charisma
- Charis (name)
- Grâces
- Three of Cups Tarot
- Arete (ancient Greco-Roman goddess & concept of excellence).

== Footnotes ==
(The Imagebase links are all broken)
