= Eurymedousa =

Disambiguation page

Eurymedousa or Eurymedusa (Ancient Greek: Εὐρυμέδουσα) is a name attributed to several women in Greek mythology.

- Eurymedousa, daughter of Cletor or Achelous. Zeus approached and seduced her in the form of an ant. As a result, she gave birth to Myrmidon.
- According to Cornutus, Eurymedousa was a possible mother of the Charites by Zeus.
- Eurymedousa, an old woman from Apeire and the nanny and attendant of Nausicaa.
- Eurymedousa, a daughter of Aetolus and possibly the mother of Oeneus by Porthaon.
- Eurymedousa, daughter of Polyxenus, one of the would-be sacrificial victims of Minotaur rescued by Theseus.
