= Eurydome =

Mother of the Charites in Cornutus

According to Lucius Annaeus Cornutus' Compendium Theologiae Graecae, Eurydome (/jʊˈrɪdəmiː/; Ancient Greek: Ευρυδόμη) was the mother of the Charites by Zeus (a role normally attributed to the similarly named Eurynome).
