= The Lady in White (Bracquemond) =

Painting by Marie Bracquemond

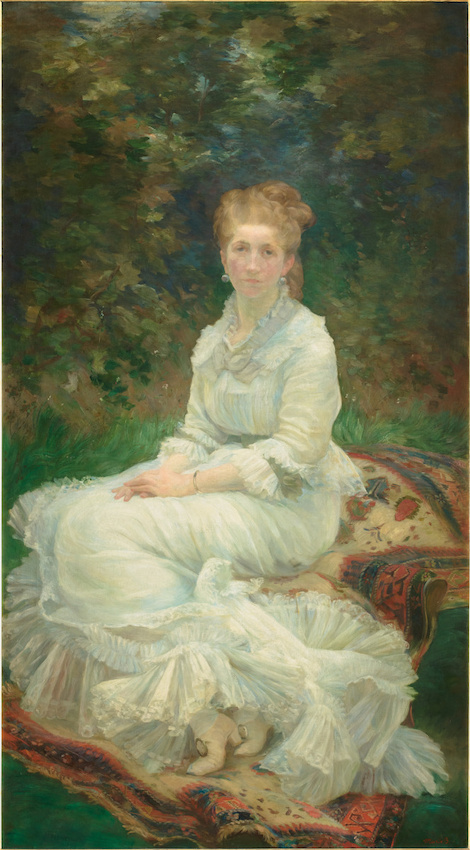
- Artist: Marie Bracquemond
- Year: 1880
- Medium: Oil on canvas
- Dimensions: 180.5 cm × 105 cm (71.1 in × 41 in)
- Location: Musée d'Orsay; Paris

The Lady in White (French: Le Dame en blanc), also known as The Woman in White, is an 1880 oil-on-canvas painting by French artist Marie Bracquemond. It depicts the artist's half-sister Louise Quivoron (b. 1849), who often served as a model for her paintings. It was one of three paintings by Bracquemond shown at the Fifth Impressionist Exhibition in April 1880. A previous painting, Woman in the Garden (1877), may have been a study for The Lady in White. Like other Impressionists, Bracquemond worked outside en plein air, mostly in her garden at Sèvres. The work received renewed attention in 2024, with a series of exhibitions in honor of the 150-year anniversary of the original Impressionist exhibitions.

== Background ==
Marie Bracquemond (1840–1916) was a French artist who began painting in the 1850s. Unlike many of her contemporaries, she came from a working-class background and was mostly self-taught. She was initially influenced by Romanticism, which was in vogue at the time. She began by painting small medieval scenes, such as people reading (Note: Reading, also known as La Lecture, is dated to around 1870. It was exhibited at the Salon of 1875. It measures 42 x 38 cm (16.53 × 14.96 in). See Bouillon 2008, p. 232, and La Gazette Drouot 2024.) and portraits (Cervantes in Prison). Her interest in medieval art was likely influenced by her childhood near Ussel close to the ancient abbey Notre-Dame de Bonnaigue. Her style changed as she received training from Jean-Auguste-Dominique Ingres (1780–1867).

Most women artists in the late 19th century were discouraged from working outside the studio by themselves; this social convention limited their range of subjects. Bracquemond's study under Ingres was not helped, as he was known for saying he "doubted the courage and perseverance of women in the field of painting." Ingres wished to confine her in the studio to only painting "flowers, fruits, still lifes, portraits and genre scenes"—subjects and styles Ingres believed were suitable for women. This approach drove Bracquemond away from Ingres, leading her to abandon her study with him, but his influence of formalism remained visible in her early works like Portrait of the Mother, Aline Pasquiou-Quivoron (1860), which reveals her study of Rembrandt (1606–1669).

While painting at the Louvre in 1866, Marie met Félix Bracquemond, later marrying him in 1869. Félix had studied under Joseph Guichard (1806–1880), a student of Ingres. By the 1870s, Marie's work had hints of Realism (The Backgammon Players) reflecting her appreciation of painters like Alfred Stevens (1823–1906). Félix would later exhibit with the First Impressionist Exhibition in 1874, with them both submitting works to the Fourth Exhibition in 1879. During the late 1870s, the influence of the then nascent Impressionists began to make its mark on Marie, with artists like Edgar Degas (1834–1917), Claude Monet (1840–1926), and Pierre-Auguste Renoir (1841–1919) influencing her approach to art.

== Development ==
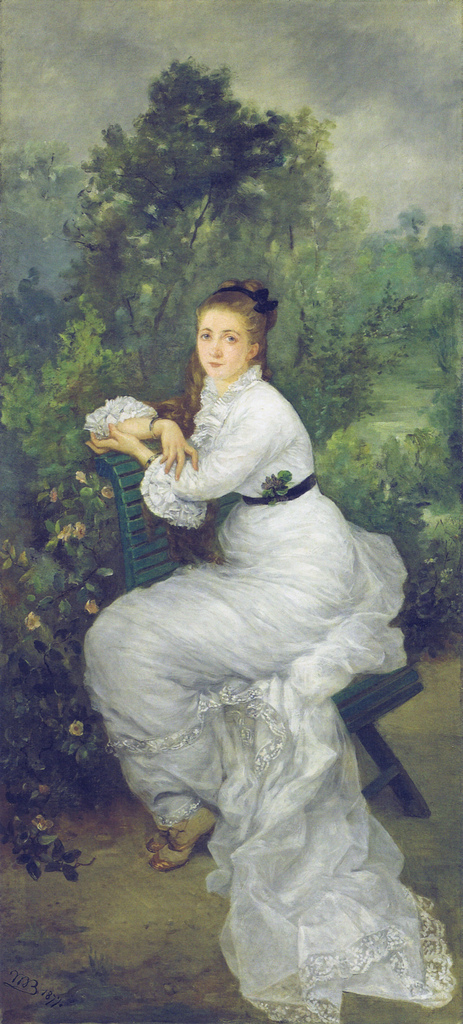
Woman in the Garden (1877)

The Lady in White may have been made en plein air, but the composition was given careful thought, as a number of drawings were made beforehand as a study. Art historian Laurent Manoeuvre describes one preparatory study for the painting, a drawing in black ink, (Note: Preparatory study, RF 15292. See Musée du Louvre, Département des Arts graphiques.) as being influenced by the style of Ingres. Another previous work, Woman in the Garden (1877) may have also been an early study. In all of these works, Bracquemond's half-sister, Louise Quiveron, served as a model for her paintings, an arrangement typical of the limited options available to women artists in 19th-century France, whose freedom to study art was greatly curtailed.

Painting a figure in a garden was a common subject for the Impressionists. The subject also gave women artists like Bracquemond the ability to paint en plein air at home in her own garden at Sèvres, circumventing the cultural restrictions on women artists painting alone outside. Pierre, Bracquemond's son, described how his mother was obsessed with and studied the color white as it changed in the outdoor sunlight, a common problem for the Impressionists. According to Pierre, the painting was the last one his mother made in the "classical technique", indicating to art historian Tamar Garb that it was a transitional work from the influence of Jean-Baptiste-Camille Corot (1796–1875) and the Naturalists to Bracquemond's subsequent Impressionistic style of choice.

== Description ==
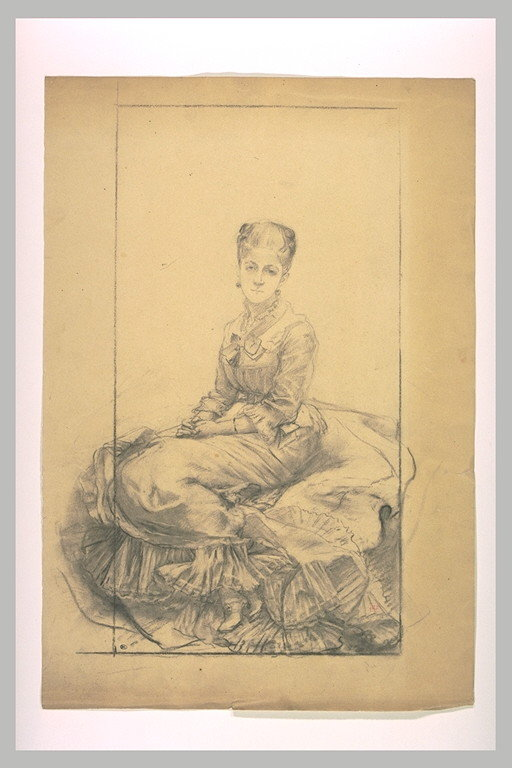
Preparatory study for The Lady in White (Undated).

At 180.5 cm × 105 cm (71.1 in × 41 in), this life-size painting depicts a woman in a white dress sitting in a garden. It is signed "Marie B." in the lower right corner. The woman appears seated on a carpet outside on the grass with her hands clasped in her lap, forward facing in three-quarter profile to the left.

== Fifth Impressionist Exhibition ==
Marie submitted three paintings, Portrait, L'Hirondelle, and Etude il'apres nature, to the Fifth Impressionist Exhibition, held at the 10 rue des Pyramides from 1–30 April 1880. Portrait is now believed to be The Lady in White, originally submitted as cat. no. 85. A second submission, Etude il'apres nature, has been identified as The Painter and his Model in a Garden, also featuring her sister as the model. The man in the painting is thought to be French artist James Tissot. Her paintings were shown alongside works by her husband as well as Caillebotte, Degas, Forain, Gauguin, Guillaumin, Lebourg, Levert, Pissarro, Raffaëlli, Rouart, Tillot, Vidal, Vignon, and Zandomeneghi.

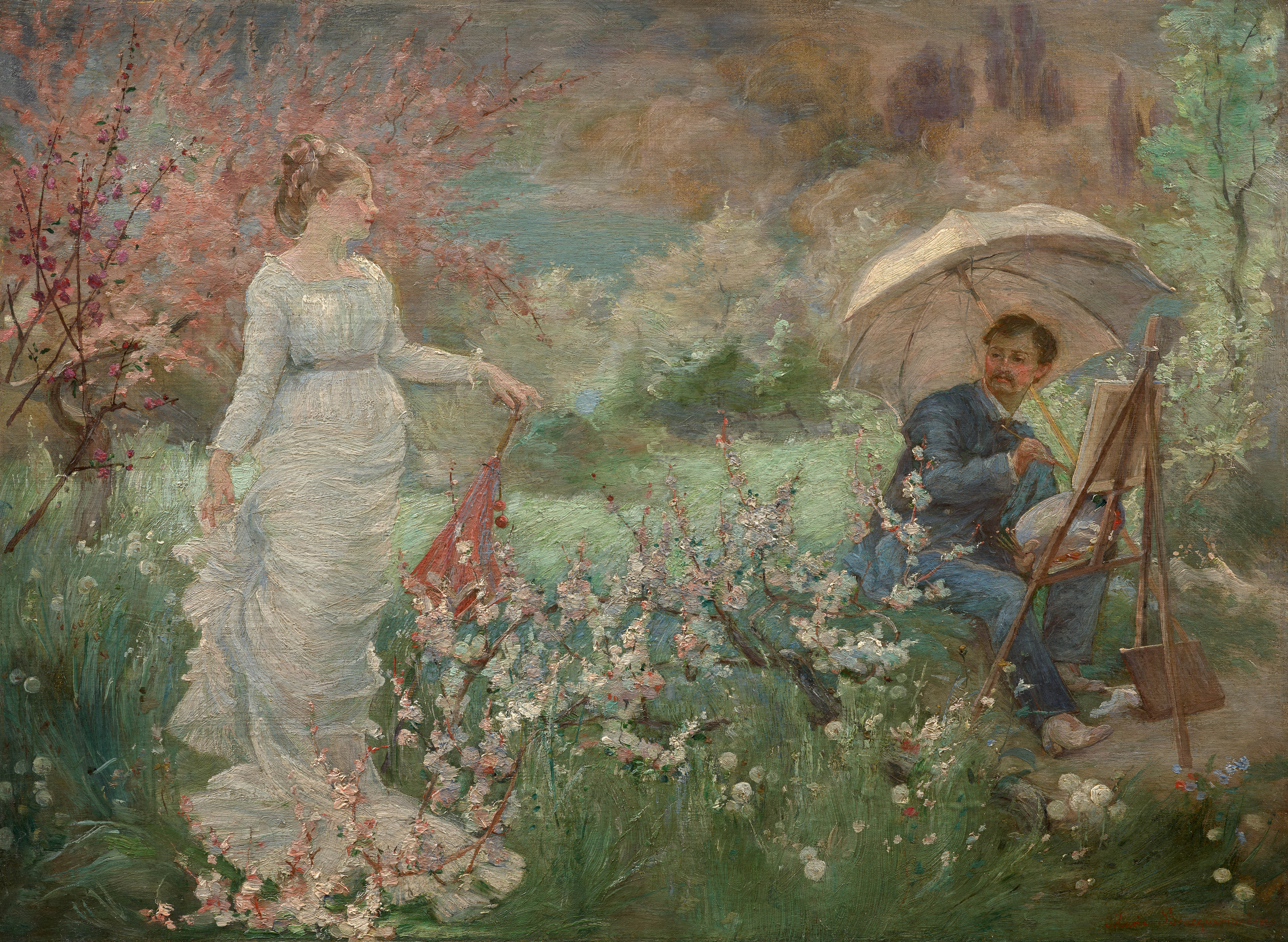
The Painter and his Model in a Garden (1880)

== Reception ==
French art critics praised the work during its initial viewing at the Fifth Impressionist Exhibition. Arthur d'Echerac called her new approach with oil paint a "masterful debut", while Gustave Goetschy said that Bracquemond "paints ravishingly". Philippe Burty noted that the work was the culmination of "serious study", while Paul Armand Silvestre observed the influence of landscapes like those found in the work of François Boucher (1703–1770), with Bracquemond achieving, according to Silvestre, "very harmonious effects in which there are tapestry backgrounds that seem to shine from the light of an apotheosis."

== Related work ==
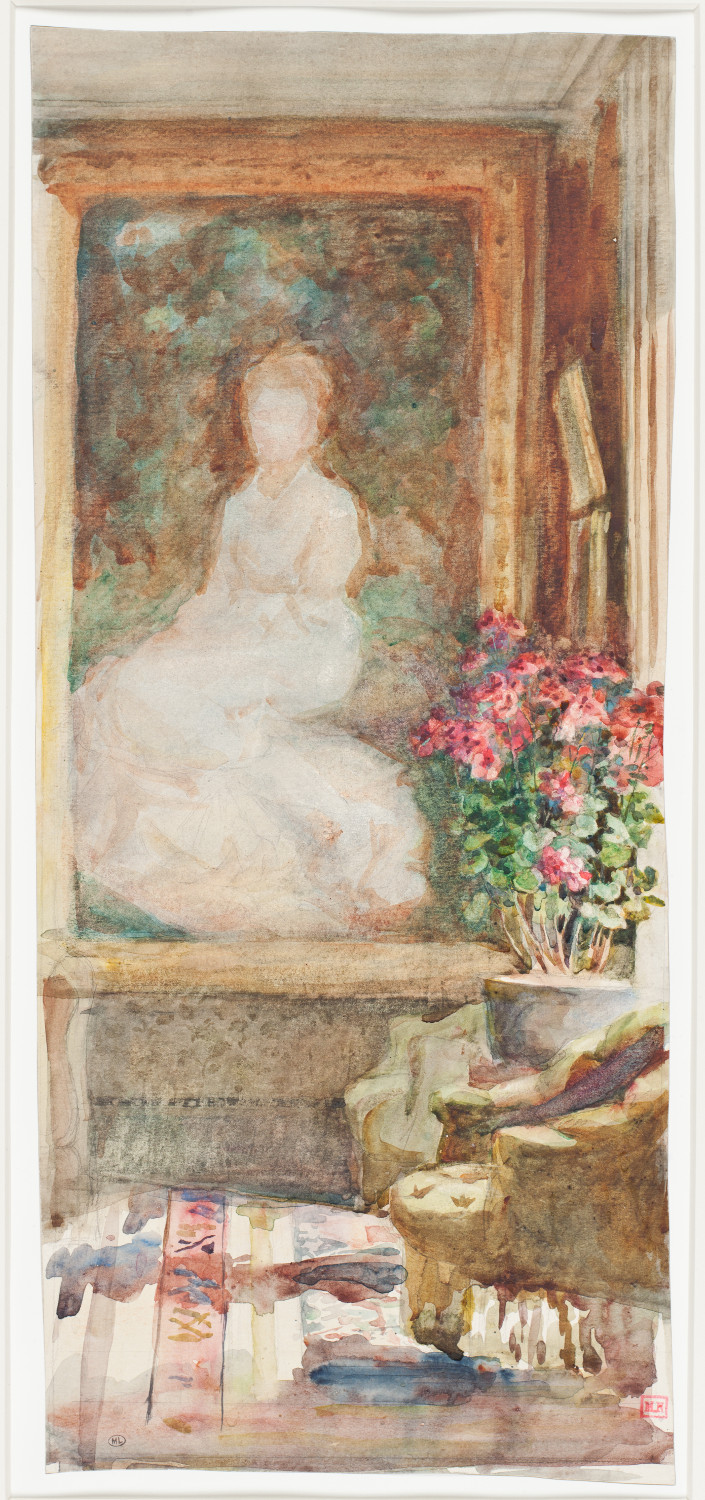
Interior of a Salon

The Lady in White would later make an appearance as a painting within a painting in the background of Bracquemond's watercolor Interior of a Salon.

== Provenance ==
French art critic Gustave Geffroy originally bought the painting and bequeathed it to the city of Paris. The painting was displayed at the Luxembourg Palace until the gallery closed. It was then displayed from 1929 to 2019 at the Musée des Beaux-Arts de Cambrai. The painting underwent restoration at some point before 1984. In the late 2010s, it became known that the painting, which had been held on deposit in Cambrai for 90 years, would be moved to Paris and exhibited at the Musée d'Orsay. Due to French laws regarding important art works, it was unlikely the painting would return to Cambrai. Upon hearing this, several hundred people in Cambrai signed a petition to keep the painting and lend it to the Musée d'Orsay temporarily instead, but were unsuccessful. The Musée d'Orsay acquired the painting in 2019.

== Recent exhibitions ==
On the 150-year anniversary of the original eight Impressionist exhibitions (1874–1886), the Ordrupgaard art museum in Copenhagen, Denmark, highlighted works by Berthe Morisot, Mary Cassatt, Eva Gonzalès, and Marie Bracquemond, in the 2024 exhibition Impressionism and Its Overlooked Women, co-curated by Dorthe Vangsgaard Nielsen. The exhibition featured The Lady in White, along with several other works by Bracquemond. The exhibition continued to the National Gallery of Ireland, where it was shown under the title Women Impressionists, co-curated by Janet McLean.

== Notes and references ==
Notes

== Bibliography ==
- Becker, Jane R. (2017). "Marie Bracquemond, Impressionist Innovator: Escaping the Fury". In Laurence Madeline (ed.) Women Artists in Paris, 1850-1900. Yale University Press. pp. 55–68. ISBN 9780300223934. OCLC 982652244.
- Bouillon, Jean-Paul. Kane, Elizabeth (1984-1985). "Marie Bracquemond." Woman's Art Journal. 5 (2): 21–27. ISSN 2158-8457. OCLC 46849883. (subscription required)
- Bouillon, Jean-Paul (2008). "Marie Bracquemond: The Lady with the Parasol". In Pfeiffer, Ingrid; Hollein, Max, eds. Women Impressionists. Hatje Cantz. pp. 232–279. ISBN 9783775720793. OCLC 183262558.
- Demeulenaere, Bruno (June 15, 2019). "Cambrai: 'La Dame en blanc' Est partie réjouir les yeux des visiteurs du Musée d’Orsay". La Voix du Nord. (subscription required)
  - Demeulenaere, Bruno (June 16, 2019). "'La Dame en blanc' est partie réjouir les yeux des visiteurs dumusée d'Orsay". La Voix du Nord. (subscription required)
- Garb, Tamar (1987)[1986]. Women Impressionists. Rizzoli. ISBN 0847807576. OCLC 14368525.
- Jansen, Mariska (2020). Marie Bracquemond (1840-1916) de vergeten impressionist. (MA thesis). Radboud University. Retrieved October 14, 2024.
- Kagawa, Kyoko (2021). "Marie Bracquemond's On the Terrace at Sevres: An Impressionist Painter's Point of Departure". Ishibashi Foundation Bulletin. Artizon Museum. 2: 119–123. OCLC 1372186300.
- Kendall, Richard (2017). "Women Artists and Impressionism". In Laurence Madeline (ed.) Women Artists in Paris, 1850-1900. Yale University Press. pp. 41–54. ISBN 9780300223934. OCLC 982652244.
- Manoeuvre, Laurent (2016). Les Pionnières: Femmes et Impressionnistes. Editions des Falaises. ISBN 9782848112831. OCLC 959921199.
  - Manoeuvre, Laurent (June 2018). "Bracquemond Marie: Découvrez la vie et l'oeuvre de Marie Bracquemond". Ministère de la Culture. Book excerpt. Retrieved October 14, 2024.
- Moffett, Charles S. (1986).The New Painting: Impressionism 1874-1886. Phaidon. pp. 293–309, 316. ISBN 9780714824307. OCLC 13269994.
- Myers, Nicole (September 2008). "Women Artists in Nineteenth-Century France" Archived 2019-05-23 at the Wayback Machine. Heilbrunn Timeline of Art History. The Metropolitan Museum of Art. Retrieved November 5, 2022.
- Nielsen, Dorthe Vangsgaard (2024). Impressionism and its Overlooked Women. Charlottenlund: Ordrupgaard. ISBN 9788794211239. OCLC 1424472031.
- Provot, Christophe (April 25, 2024). "Collection Marie & Félix Bracquemond, l’art multiforme". La Gazette Drouot. Retrieved October 12, 2024. (subscription required)
  - Marie & Félix Bracquemond : un couple au service des arts. 30 April 2024, lot 60. La Gazette Drouot. Retrieved October 12, 2024.
  - Marie & Félix Bracquemond : un couple au service des arts. 30 April 2024, lot 8. La Gazette Drouot. Retrieved October 12, 2024.
- Tonkin, Boyd (September 6, 2024). "Grace, ease and struggle". Times Literary Supplement. Retrieved October 13, 2024. (subscription required)
