= Three Women with Parasols =

Painting by Marie Bracquemond

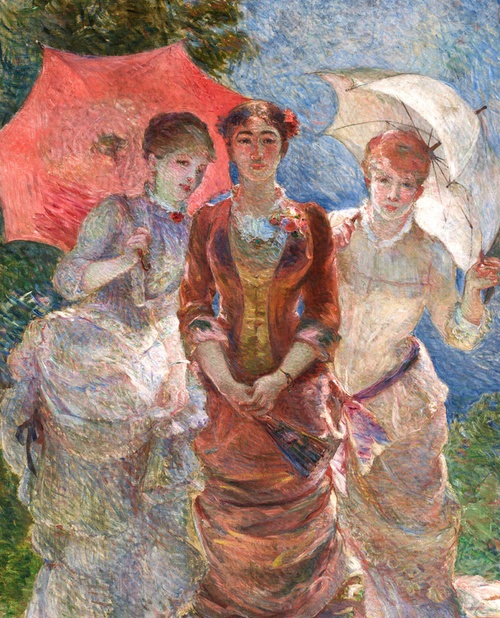
- Artist: Marie Bracquemond
- Year: 1880
- Medium: Oil on canvas
- Dimensions: 141.3 cm × 89.5 cm (55.6 in × 35.2 in)
- Location: Musée d'Orsay; Paris

Three Women with Parasols (French: Trois femmes aux ombrelles), also known as The Three Graces, is an 1880 oil-on-canvas painting by French artist Marie Bracquemond. The painting depicts three women wearing the then fashionable style of ruffled dresses with high bodices. The woman in the middle holds a fan in the popular style of Japonisme. Marie's half-sister Louise Quivoron was the model for the two figures on each side while Bracquemond based the central figure on her own likeness. Bracquemond produced several studies for the work, and one may have been shown in 1886 at the eighth Impressionist exhibition. The work is often known by the moniker of The Three Graces, referring to the three goddesses of the Charites (the Gratiae or "Graces") from Roman mythology who appear as a common theme in Western art. Art historians refer to the painting as one of the most impressionistic works Bracquemond produced during this period. French art critic Gustave Geffroy was so taken with the work that he purchased it from Bracquemond and hung it in the Luxembourg Palace. The work was received by the Musée du Luxembourg through the bequest of Geffroy in 1926, where it appeared for the next ten years. In 1936, it was moved to Chemillé City Hall where it stayed until 2013 when it was acquired by the Musée d’Orsay.

== Study ==
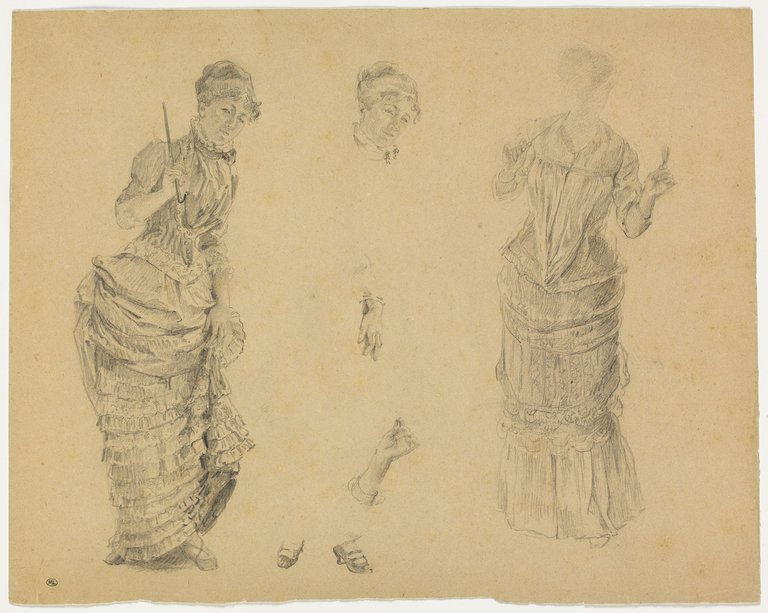
Study for Three Women with Parasols
