= Under the Lamp =

Painting by Marie Bracquemond

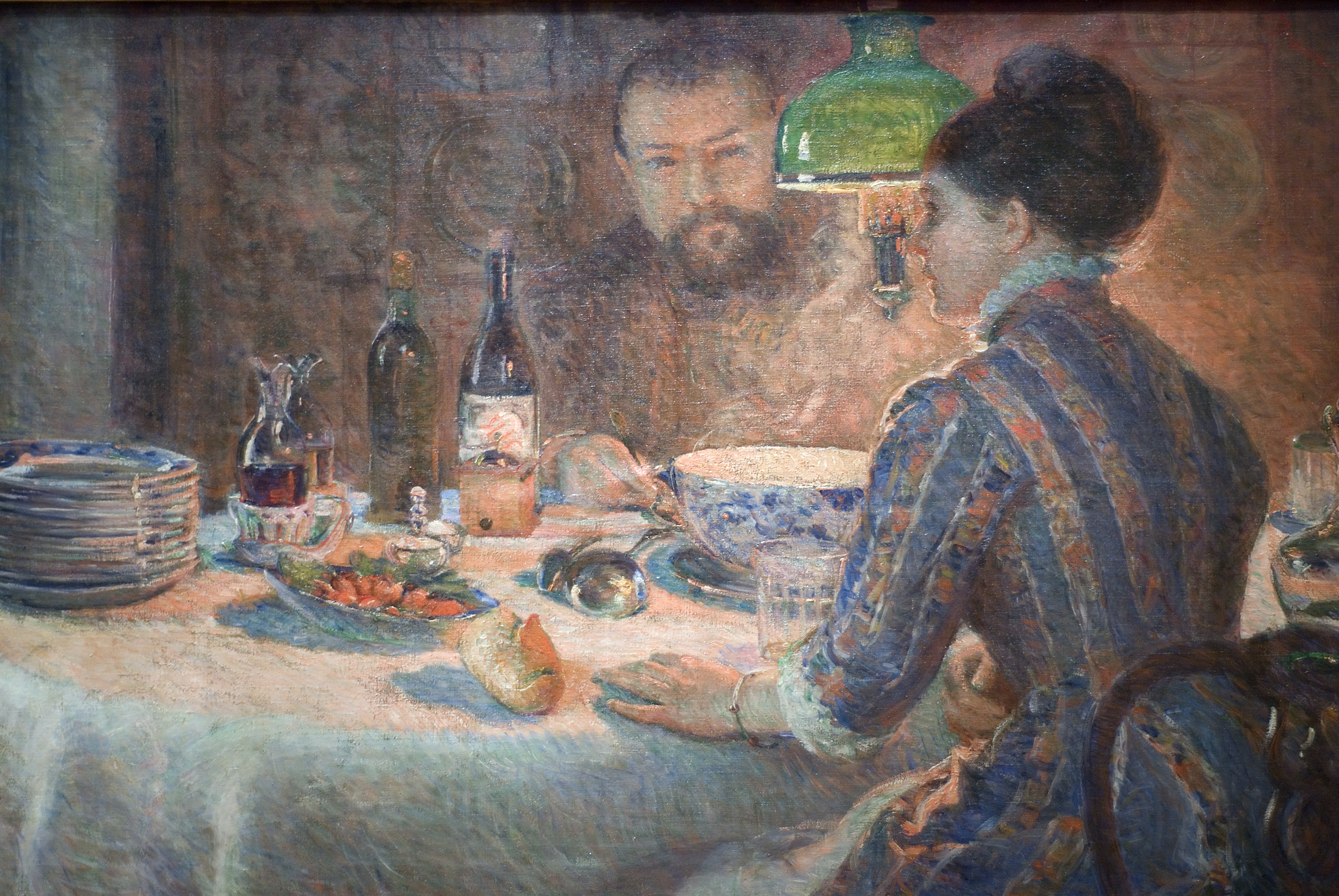
- Artist: Marie Bracquemond
- Year: 1887
- Medium: Oil on canvas
- Dimensions: 68.5 cm × 113 cm (27.0 in × 44 in)
- Location: Mr. and Mrs. R. Stephens Phillips

Under the Lamp, also known as Sous la lampe - Afred Sisley et sa femme, chez Bracquemond à Sèvres, painted in 1887 · is an oil-on-canvas painted by French artist Marie Bracquemond. It is held in a private collection.

== History and description ==
The work represents one of a handful at the end of a five-year period (1881–1886) during which she did not produce any paintings. In May 1886, she exhibited her works for the last time at the eighth and final exhibition of the Impressionists. Later that year, Paul Gauguin (1848–1903) came to stay with her family, sharing his approach and techniques. Under the Lamp was likely completed at Bracquemond's home in Sèvres. The portrait features Alfred Sisley (1839–1899) and his then long-term partner Marie-Louise Adélaïde-Eugénie Lescouezec, who would later become his wife. They are seated at the dinner table in Bracquemond's home, lit by the light of a gas lamp.

Gustave Geffroy, the first historian of Impressionism, gave a positive review of Bracquemond's use of light in his 1894 history of the movement. It was bought by an American collector in 1971.

== Others ==
- There is a work by French painter Henri Lebasque called Sous la lampe (Under the Lamp) painted in 1904.
