= On the Terrace at Sèvres =

Painting by Marie Bracquemond

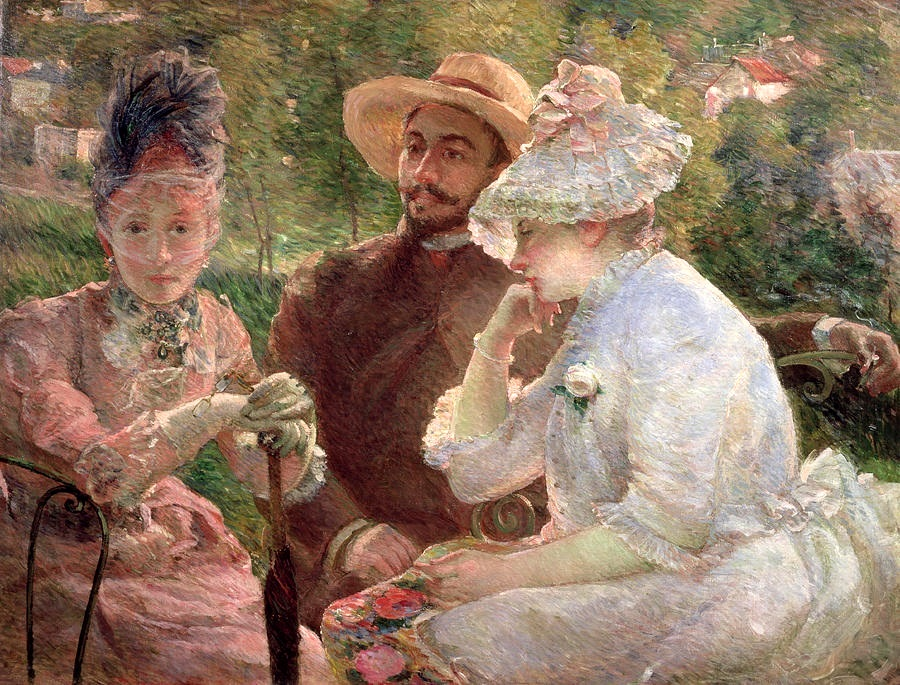
- Artist: Marie Bracquemond
- Year: 1880
- Medium: Oil on canvas
- Dimensions: 88 cm × 115 cm (35 in × 45 in)
- Location: Musée du Petit Palais; Geneva

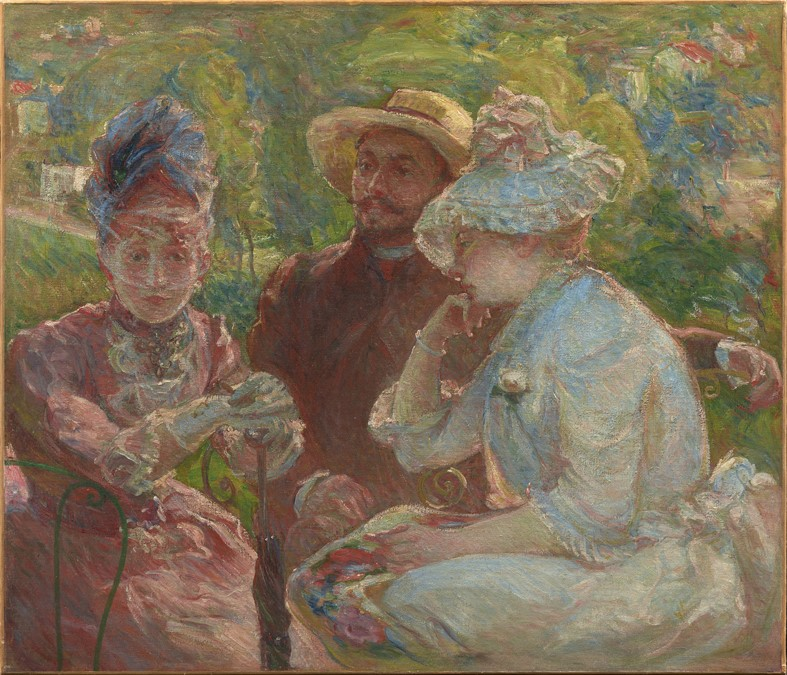
Marie Bracquemond, On the Terrace at Sèvres (Artizon Museum).

On the Terrace at Sèvres (French: Sur la terrasse à Sèvres) is the title of at least two 1880 oil-on-canvas paintings with the same subject by French artist Marie Bracquemond. A larger version (88 × 115 cm) is held by the Musée du Petit Palais in Geneva, Switzerland, while a smaller version (56.8 × 64.5 cm) is held by the Artizon Museum, Ishibashi Foundation, in Tokyo, Japan. The piece depicts three figures on the terrace of Marie Bracquemond's home, with stylistic and compositional elements characteristic of her shift toward Impressionism. Although details about the identities of the figures in the painting remain debated, critics highlight the implementation of light, soft brushwork, and an emphasis on figures over landscape, aligning it with Bracquemond's most Impressionist period.

== Composition ==
Both the larger and smaller versions of this paintings depict three people on the terrace of Marie and her husband, Félix Bracquemond's home outside of Paris, in Sèvres. There are small stylistic differences between the two paintings, so it is unknown if the smaller version was a preliminary study for the larger work or a different version entirely.^{: 61} Although historians are certain of its origins and creator, the work is unsigned, and may even have initially had a different title: Study from Nature.

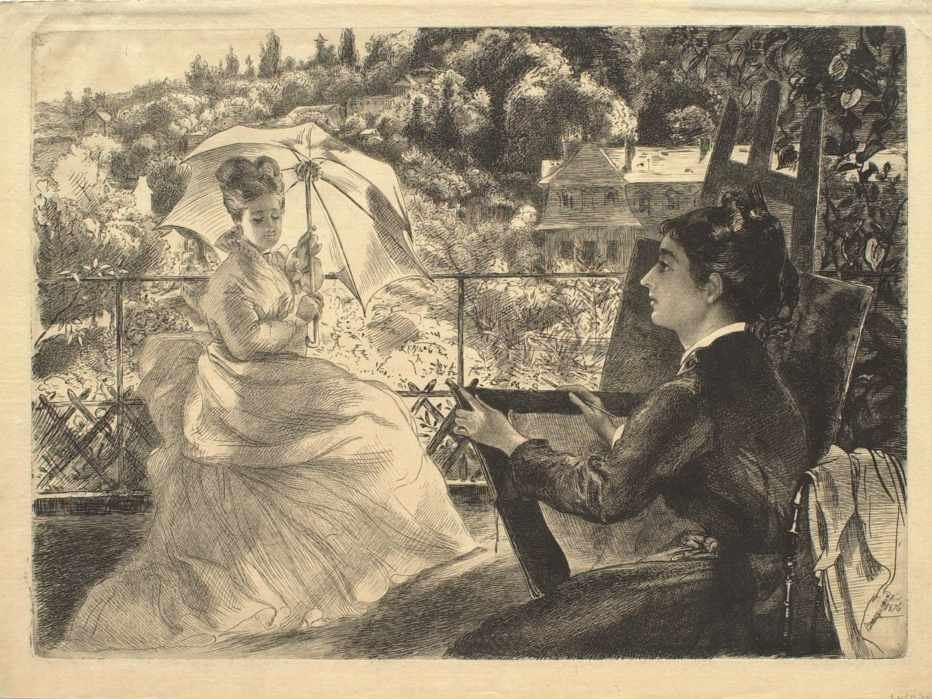
Félix Bracquemond's 1876 work, The Terrace

Similar to Bracquemond's other works, and to those of her female counterparts, critics note, the landscape is carefully considered, but is ultimately a mere backdrop for the figures depicted, who are the clear focus of the piece.As in the other works she produced in 1880, Bracquemond explores the nature of the changing color of white in the light of the outdoors. It is this period in time that historians identify Bracquemond's shift in influence from Ingres and Alfred Stevens to Impressionists Renoir and Monet. This painting in particular is considered her most classically Impressionist piece, due to the incorporation of such gentle and free flowing brush strokes as well as light dispersion through foliage and onto the figures in the work, the use of shadows, and color selection. Critics suggest that Bracquemond was additionally influenced, at least in content, by Felix Bracquemond's earlier work from 1876 entitled The Terrace (French: La Terasse), as it also depicts Marie and her sister on the Bracquemonds' terrace.^{: 48} The firm features of the figures and treatment of light on fabrics are specific to Marie Bracquemond's individual artistic style, however.

== Content ==
Concerning the figures depicted in the painting, there has been some debate. Originally, critics assumed the man to be Henri Fantin-Latour, French painter and close friend of the Bracquemonds, but French art historian and professor Jean-Paul Bouillon noted an inconsistency between the age of the depicted figure and Fantin-Latour in real life. The painting's current owner believes the man is Baron Ghez, although there is no further description or support provided.^{: 61}

Prior to the Bouillon's observation about the age inconsistency, the woman on the right was assumed to be Fantin-Latour's wife, Victoria Dubourg, and the woman on the left was thought to be Marie Bracquemond herself. Pierre Bracquemond, Marie's son, later announced that Marie's sister, Louise Quiveron, had in fact been the model for both women, shown frontally on the left and in profile on the right.

== Provenance ==
On the Terrace at Sèvres was likely displayed at the Fifth Impressionist Exhibit in the year of its completion, although Gustave Geffroy, art critic and advocate of Bracquemond's work, is the single known source of this information. Oscar Ghez, a Swiss businessman and art collector, bought the larger painting in 1970 and it was shown at the Musée du Petit Palais in Geneva where it popularized Bracquemond's work to the world. In 1919, the smaller painting was acquired by private collectors and passed through several different owners. The Diane B. Wilsey collection bought it in 2008, followed by its acquisition by The Ishibashi Foundation in 2019.

Bracquemond made many early sketches of this work, but it is not clear how many survived or where they may be held. Galerie Schweitzer in New York did record the sale of one of these sketches in 1974, but its location since is unidentified.

== Related works ==
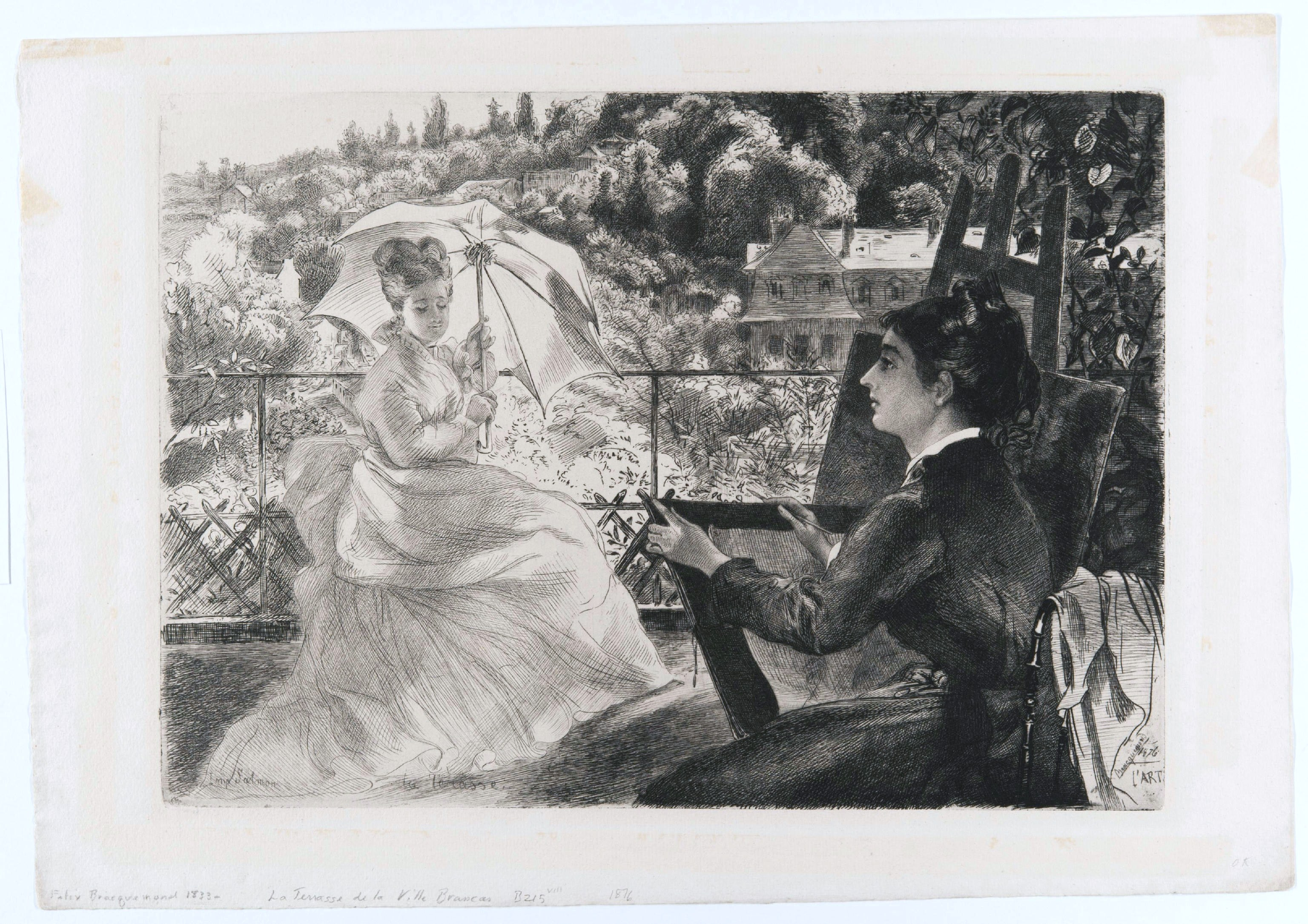
The Terrace (1876), by Félix Bracquemond.

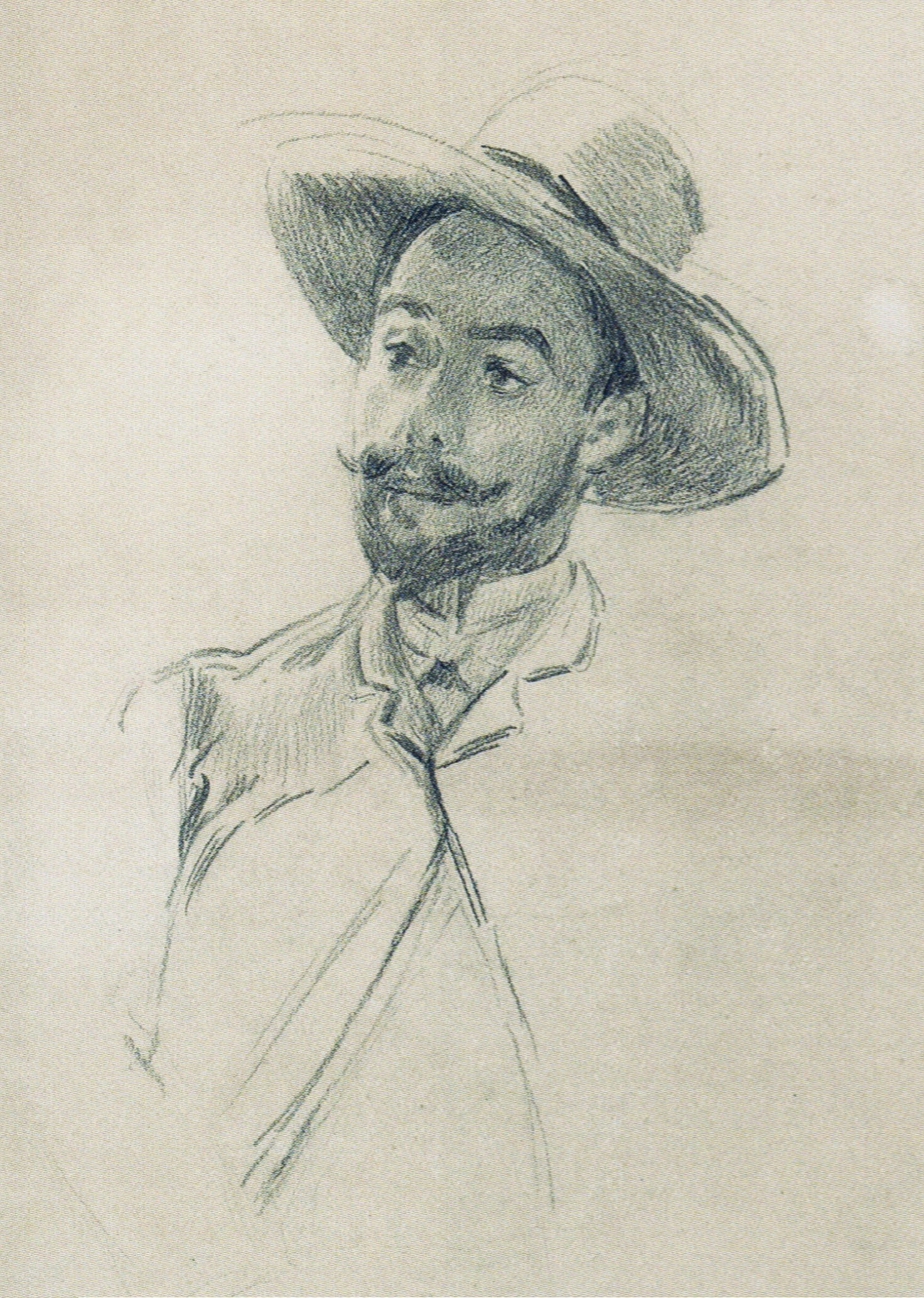
Unknown man, but possibly a portrait of Félix Bracquemond (Study for On the Terrace at Sèvres)

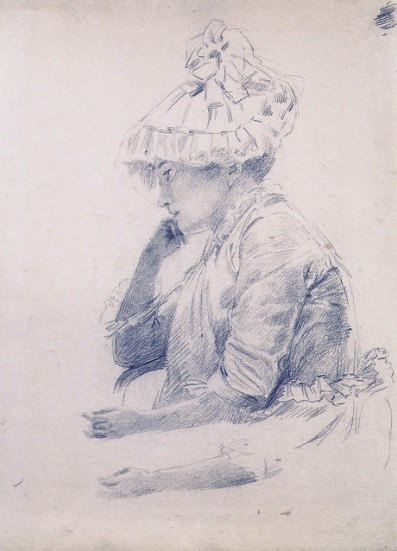
Louise Quivoron (Study for On the Terrace at Sèvres)
