= Afternoon Tea (Bracquemond) =

Painting by Marie Bracquemond

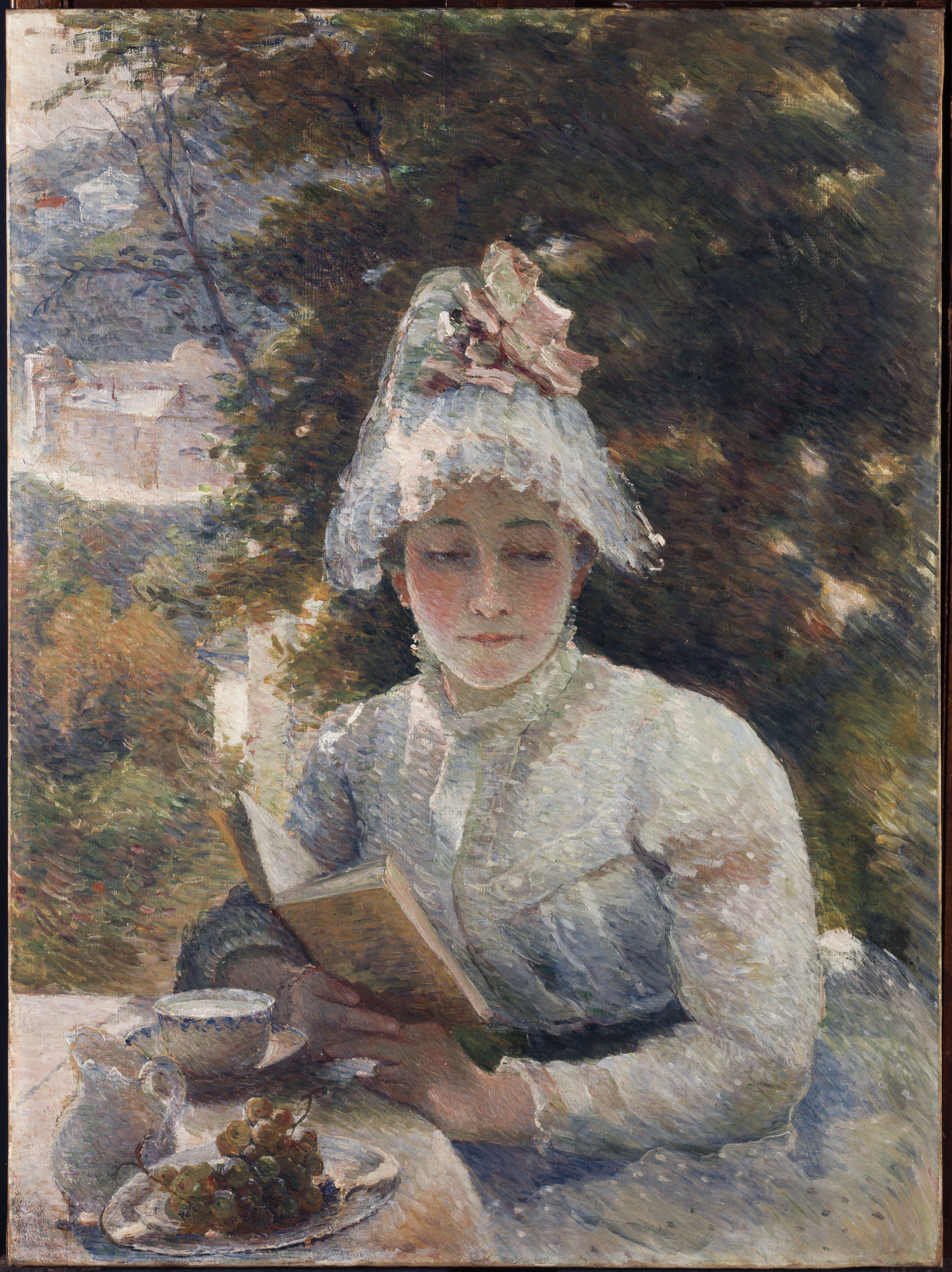
- Artist: Marie Bracquemond
- Year: 1880
- Medium: Oil on canvas
- Dimensions: 81.5 cm × 61.5 cm (32.1 in × 24.2 in)
- Location: Petit Palais; Paris

Afternoon Tea (French: Le goûter) is an 1880 oil-on-canvas painting by French artist Marie Bracquemond. It is a portrait of the artist's half-sister Louise Quivoron, who often served as a model for her paintings, reading in a garden at Bracquemond's home in the Parisian suburb of Sèvres. The work was shown during an exhibition in 1919 and purchased by the French government from Bracquemond's son Pierre. It is now in the collection of the Petit Palais, Musée des Beaux-Arts de la Ville de Paris. It is one of her few works held in a public collection. The theme of the work reflects the intellectual activities of the lives of women, and can be compared to related works such as Mary Cassatt’s The Reader (1877) and Harriet Backer’s Evening (1890).

== Study ==
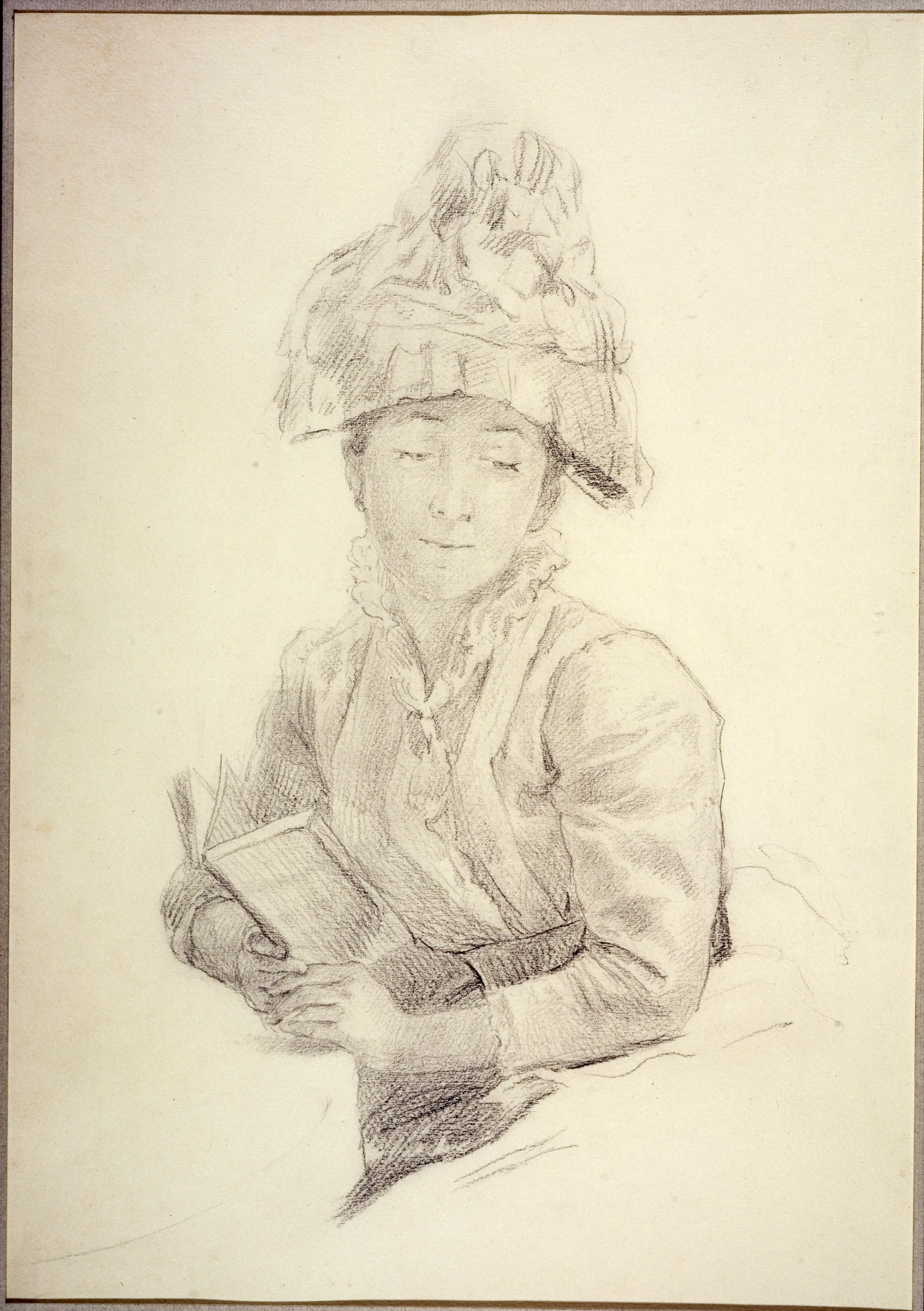
Study for Afternoon Tea
