= Marie Bracquemond =

French painter (1840–1916)

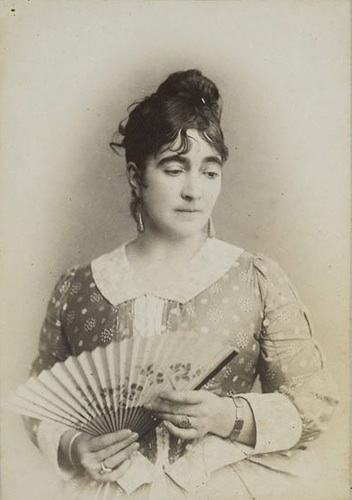
- Bracquemond c. 1886
- Born: Marie Anne Caroline Quivoron; 1 December 1840; Argenton-en-Landunvez, near Brest, Finistère, France
- Died: 17 January 1916 (aged 75); Sèvres, Paris, France
- Known for: Painting
- Movement: Impressionism
- Spouse: Félix Bracquemond (m. 1869; died 1914)

Marie Anne Caroline Bracquemond (French pronunciation: [maʁi bʁakmɔ̃]; née Quivoron; 1 December 1840 – 17 January 1916) was a French Impressionist artist. She was one of four notable women in the Impressionist movement, along with Mary Cassatt, Berthe Morisot, and Eva Gonzalès. Bracquemond studied drawing as a child and began showing her work at the Paris Salon when she was still an adolescent. She never underwent formal art training, but she received limited instruction from Jean-Auguste-Dominique Ingres and advice from Paul Gauguin which contributed to her stylistic approach.

She married noted printmaker Félix Bracquemond, who helped popularize Japanese art in France. Together, they produced ceramic art for Haviland & Co., a manufacturer of Limoges porcelain. Marie's frequent omission from books on artists is sometimes attributed to the efforts of her husband. Although Félix participated with the Impressionist exhibitions, he notably disapproved of the movement at which his wife excelled. Indeed, Pierre Bracquemond, their son, stated that his father was jealous of Marie's work, belittled her ambition, and refused to show her paintings to visitors.

Marie participated in three out of the eight major Impressionist exhibitions, submitting her work to the fourth (1879), fifth (1880), and eighth (1889) group showings. During her lifetime as an artist, Bracquemond produced at least 157 original works, of which only 31 have been located and catalogued in existing collections today, with the rest having disappeared into various private collections without record. Her only two solo exhibitions were held after her death. Some of her most famous works include The Lady in White (1880), On the Terrace at Sèvres (1880), Afternoon Tea (1880), and Under the Lamp (1887).

== Early life ==
She was born Marie Anne Caroline Quivoron on 1 December 1840 in Argenton-en-Landunvez, near Brest, Brittany. She did not enjoy the same upbringing or career as the other well-known female Impressionists – Mary Cassatt, Berthe Morisot, and Eva Gonzalès. She was the child of an unhappy arranged marriage. Her mother, Aline Hyacinthe Marie Pasquiou, pursued her life with Émile Langlois before his death, and beforehand they led an unsettled existence, moving from Brittany to the Jura Mountains, to Switzerland, and to Limousin, before settling in Étampes, south of Paris. She had one sister, Louise, born in 1849 while her family lived near Ussel (department Corrèze in Limousin) in the ancient abbey Notre-Dame de Bonnaigue.

She began lessons in painting at the teenage age of 17 under the instruction of M. Auguste Vassor, "an old painter who now restored paintings and gave lessons to the young women of the town." She progressed to such an extent that in 1857 she submitted a painting of her mother, sister and old teacher posed in the studio to the Salon which was accepted. She was then introduced to the painter Ingres who advised her and introduced her to two of his students, Flandrin and Signol.

The critic Philippe Burty referred to her as "one of the most intelligent pupils in Ingres' studio." As a student in Ingres' private Parisian studio, she wrote that, "The severity of Monsieur Ingres frightened me ... because he doubted the courage and perseverance of a woman in the field of painting ... He would assign to them only the painting of flowers, of fruits, of still lives, portraits and genre scenes."

She later left Ingres' studio and began receiving commissions for her work, including one from the court of Empress Eugenie for a painting of Cervantes in prison. This evidently pleased, because she was then asked by the Count de Nieuwerkerke, the director-general of French museums, to make important copies in the Louvre.

== Family ==
It was while she was copying Old Masters in the Louvre that she saw Félix Bracquemond, who fell in love with her. His friend, the critic Eugène Montrosier, arranged an introduction and, from then, she and Félix were inseparable. They were engaged for two years before marrying on 5 August 1869, despite her mother's opposition. On 22 June 1870, they had their only child, Pierre (1870–1926). Because of the scarcity of good medical care during the War of 1870 and the Paris Commune, Bracquemond's already delicate health deteriorated after her son's birth. Much of what is known of Bracquemond's personal life comes from an unpublished short biography authored by her son, entitled La Vie de Félix et Marie Bracquemond.

== Career ==
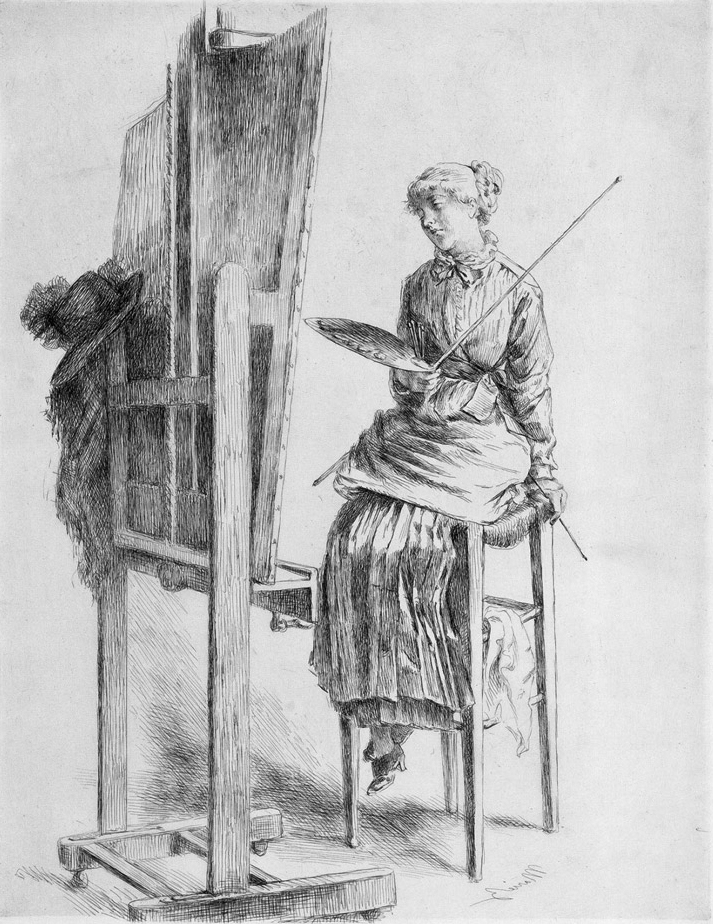
Marie Bracquemond, Woman Painting at the Easel, undated. etching, 31.5 x 24.8 cm.

Félix and Marie Bracquemond worked together at the Haviland studio at Auteuil where her husband had become artistic director. She designed plates for dinner services and executed large tile panels (once known as faience) depicting Les Muses des arts (The muses of the arts), which were shown at the Universal Exhibition of 1878. The work is now considered lost.

She began having paintings accepted for the Salon on a regular basis from 1864. As she found the medium constraining, her husband's efforts to teach her etching were only a qualified success. She nevertheless produced nine etchings that were shown at the second exhibition of the Society of Painter-Etchers at the Galeries Durand-Ruel in 1890. Her husband introduced her to new media and to the artists he admired, as well as older masters such as Chardin. She was especially attracted to the Belgian painter Alfred Stevens. Between 1887 and 1890, under the influence of the Impressionists, Bracquemond's style began to change. Her canvases grew larger and her colours intensified. She moved out of doors (part of a movement that came to be known as plein air), and to her husband's disgust, Monet and Degas became her mentors.

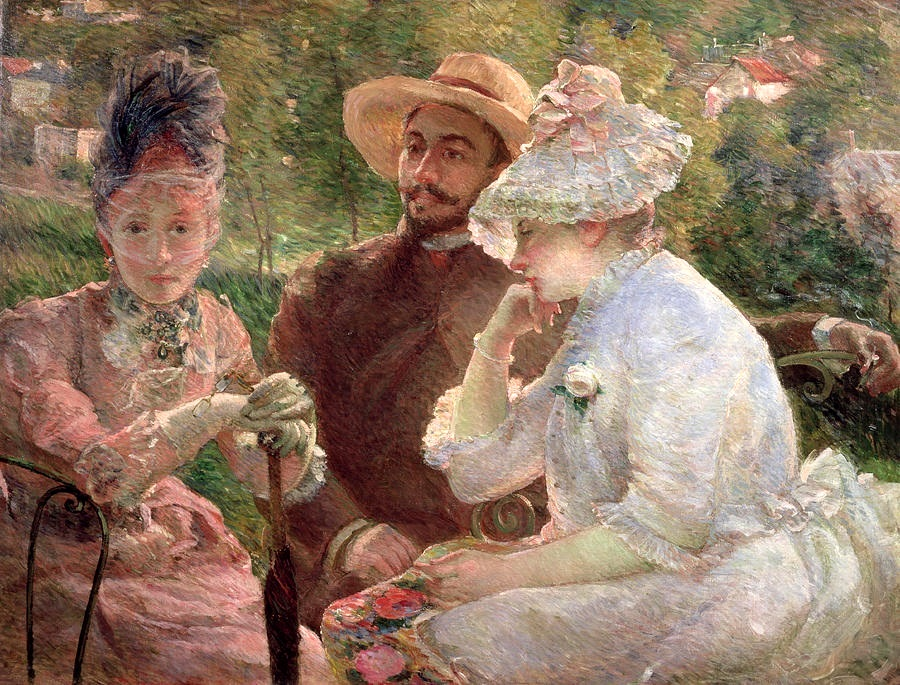
On the terrace at Sèvres (1880)

Many of her best-known works were painted outdoors, especially in her garden at Sèvres. One of her last paintings was "The Artist's Son and Sister in the Garden at Sèvres." Bracquemond participated in the Impressionist exhibitions of 1879, 1880, and 1886. In 1879 and 1880, some of her drawings were published in La Vie Moderne. In 1881, she exhibited five works at the Dudley Gallery in London.

In 1886, Félix Bracquemond met Gauguin through Sisley and brought the impoverished artist home. Gauguin had a decisive influence on Marie Bracquemond and, in particular, he taught her how to prepare her canvas in order to achieve the intense tones she now desired.

Unlike many of her Impressionist contemporaries, Bracquemond spent a great deal of effort planning her pieces. Even though many of her works have a spontaneous feel, she prepared in a traditional way through sketches and drawings. Although she was overshadowed by her well-known husband, the work of the reclusive Marie Bracquemond is considered to have been closer to the ideals of Impressionism. According to their son Pierre, Félix Bracquemond was often resentful of his wife, brusquely rejecting her critique of his work, and refusing to show her paintings to visitors. In an unpublished manuscript written by Pierre about his parents' life, he shares that his father "seldom showed her work to their friends. When he did compliment her, it was in private. Therefore, none of their artists friends paid attention to her works or spoke of her efforts, and when she revealed hopes for success, Félix put her ambition down to 'incurable vanity.'" In 1890, Marie Bracquemond, worn out by the continual household friction and discouraged by lack of interest in her work, abandoned her painting except for a few private works. Her official last work was in the same year called "The Artist’s Son and Sister in the Garden at Sèvres"

She remained a staunch defender of Impressionism throughout her life, even when she was not actively painting. In defense of the style to one of her husband's many attacks on her art, she said, "Impressionism has produced ... not only a new, but a very useful way of looking at things. It is as though all at once a window opens and the sun and air enter your house in torrents."

== Death ==
She died in Paris on January 17, 1916. On January 23, art critic Arsène Alexandre paid tribute to her memory in the newspaper Le Figaro. In the article, Alexandre wrote that Bracquemond "was one of those artists ignored, of which the times to come will astonish, both the rare talent and the voluntary shadow in which this talent enveloped itself", and described Bracquemond as an "exquisite painter" whose character "was worthy of the work: sensitive, proud and an almost excessive modesty."

== Legacy ==
Henri Focillon described Bracquemond in 1928 as one of "les trois grandes dames" of Impressionism alongside Berthe Morisot and Mary Cassatt. Feminist art criticism in the 1970s brought increasing attention to women in the Impressionist art movement, and renewed interest in the forgotten work of Marie Bracquemond. The 1985, Elizabeth Kane and Jean-Paul Bouillon published the first extensive article in English about Marie Bracquemond. In the 1980s, art historian Tamar Garb popularized women artists like Marie Bracquemond with the publication of Women Impressionists, leading to a new era of research on the subject. Bracquemond was later included in the 2018 exhibit Women in Paris 1850-1900.

== Works ==
There is no catalogue raisonné for Marie Bracquemond. This is an incomplete and unsorted list of public and privately owned paintings, watercolors, and etchings by Marie Bracquemond according to the 1919 exhibition catalog of the Bernheim-Jeune art gallery. Bracquemond produced at least 81 paintings and oil sketches, 34 watercolors, 23 drawings, and nine etchings. This list does not include her ceramic works. At least two of her works, the ceramic faience panel The Muses (1878) and the painting The Swallow (1880), depicting the Sisleys in a boat on the Seine, are untraced and presumed lost.

Paintings

1. La Dame en blanc (1880)
2. Sur la terrasse à Sèvres (1880)
3. Près de la fenêtre
4. Avenue de Bellevue sous la neige
5. Portrait de Pierre Bracquemond
6. Chrysanthèmes
7. Roses
8. Le Goûter (1880)
9. La Partie de jacquet
10. L'Aquarelliste
11. Portrait de Marie Bracquemond
12. Portrait de Félix Bracquemond (1886)
13. On vient d'allumer la lampe (1887)
14. Portrait de Pierre Bracquemond
15. Bouquet
16. Esquisse d'après une aquarelle de G. Moreau
17. Dans le jardin (1886)
18. Esquisse du tableau: "Sur la terrasse à Sèvres"
19. Vue du haut Sèvres
20. Vue de Paris
21. Étude d'arbres en fleur
22. Bouquet près de la fenêtre
23. Fleurs dans un vase
24. Panier de fraises
25. Étude: Coteau de Sèvres
26. La Route des Jardies
27. Étude à Sèvres
28. Au soleil
29. Pêches
30. Étude d'arbres
31. Étude pour "Le Goûter"
32. Étude pour "Près de la fenêtre"
33. Étude de matin
34. Femme lisant
35. L'Allée de rhododendrons
36. La Pêche aux écrevisses
37. Étude: Femme cousant
38. Étude de femme (1880)
39. Étude pour "La Tasse de café"
40. Le Peintre
41. Étude d'homme
42. Au bord du ruisseau
43. Dans un jardin
44. Verger à La Chabanne
45. Terrasse à La Chabanne
46. Le Pilote
47. Étude d'homme
48. Au bord de la Seine
49. Étude pour "La Partie de jacquet"
50. La Tricoteuse
51. Femme en rose
52. Une allée à La Chabanne
53. Sur l'étang
54. Portrait de jeune femme
55. Anémones
56. Étude (1880)
57. Étude
58. Étude
59. Projet de tableau: "Le Jet d'eau"
60. Projet de tableau: "Le Bain"
61. Projet de tableau
62. Projet de tableau
63. Projet de tableau
64. Projet de tableau
65. Projet de tableau
66. Projet de tableau
67. Projet de tableau
68. Étude de fleurs
69. Roses
70. Pivoines
71. Femme et fleurs
72. Étude pour le portrait blanc
73. Petite femme rose
74. Première communion
75. Sur la terrasse de La Chabanne
76. Étude pour "Le Goûter"
77. La Tasse de café
78. Esquisse de "Sur la terrasse à Sèvres"
79. Crevettes (1887)
80. Narcisses et anémones
81. Esquisse de "L'Arbre de Noël"
82. Projet de tableau
83. Bertrand et Raton, d'après Gustave Moreau
84. Étude de tête, pastel
85. La Promenade
86. Au soleil
87. Les Trois Grâces de 1880 (1880)
88. Reines-marguerites
89. Chrysanthèmes
90. Portrait de M^{me} Th. Haviland
91. Paysage d'Hiver
92. bis. Paul et Virginie (plaque de faïence)

Watercolors

1. Le Mont-Dore
2. Solitude
3. Portrait de la Comtesse de Bony de Lavergne
4. Étude pour le Mont-Dore
5. Le Jardin de l'École Normale à Sèvres
6. Une Allée de l'École Normale
7. Quatre petites études de femme
8. Au bord du ruisseau
9. L'Echarpe violette
10. Étude
11. L'Allée fleurie
12. Femme en deuil
13. Étude
14. Étude
15. Étude de fillette
16. Étude de femme
17. Vues de Divonne
18. Vues de Divonne
19. Vues de Divonne
20. Vues de Divonne
21. Vues de Divonne
22. Vues de Divonne
23. Vues de Divonne
24. Vues de Divonne
25. Vues de Divonne
26. Vues de Divonne
27. Vues de Divonne
28. Vues de Divonne
29. Vues de Divonne
30. Vues de Divonne
31. Vues de Divonne
32. Vues de Divonne
33. Au bord du ruisseau
34. Cueillette des pommes (1886)

Drawings

1. Le Mur du parc
2. La Crèche
3. La Poésie
4. La Foire de St-Cloud
5. Étude pour "Les Gants"
6. Étude
7. Étude
8. Étude de jeune homme
9. Portrait de Marie Bracquemond
10. Portrait de Marie Bracquemond
11. Portrait de M^{me} Chaudesaigues
12. Portrait de M^{lle} Quivoron
13. Portrait de M^{lle} Quivoron
14. Sur la branche
15. Étude de visage
16. La Danse
17. Étude de robe
18. Page d'album
19. Page d'album
20. Projet pour un plat
21. Croquis
22. Près de la fenêtre
23. Les Beaux Arts, projet de décoration

Etchings

1. Germinie Lacerteux
2. Le Petit malade
3. Le Tableau
4. Portrait de Gustave Geffroy
5. Portrait de M^{lle} Quivoron
6. Portrait de Marie Bracquemond (1888)
7. Portrait de M^{me} Béraldi
8. Portrait de M^{me} Guy Pellion
9. Les Ballons
Selected paintings

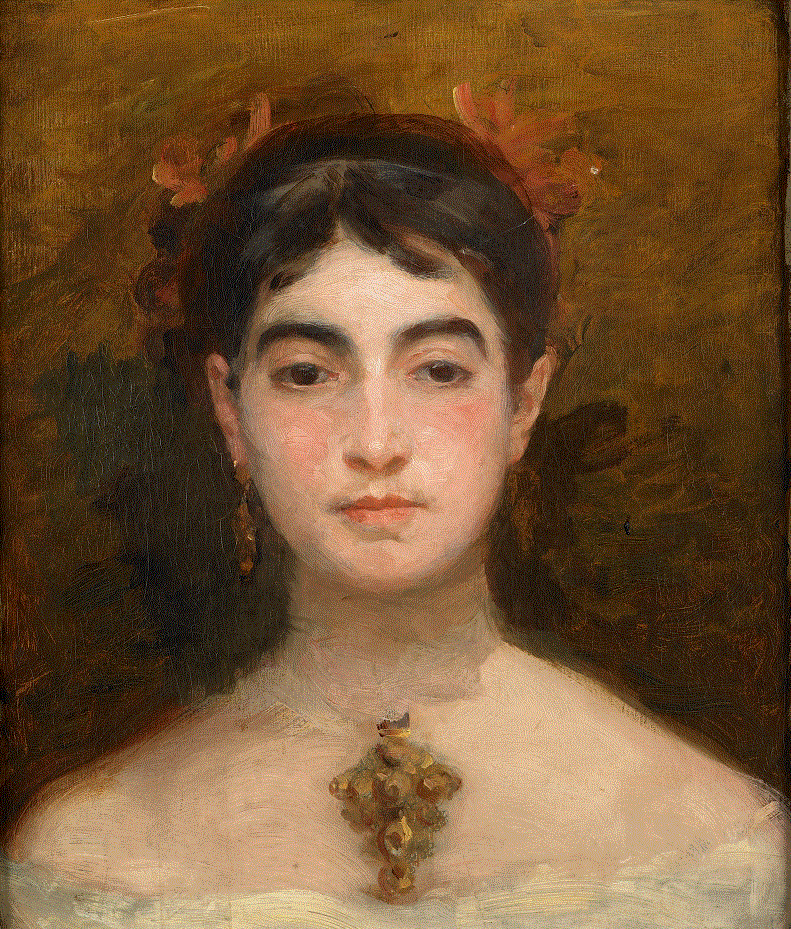
Self-portrait (1870). Musée des Beaux-Arts de Rouen, Normandy, France.

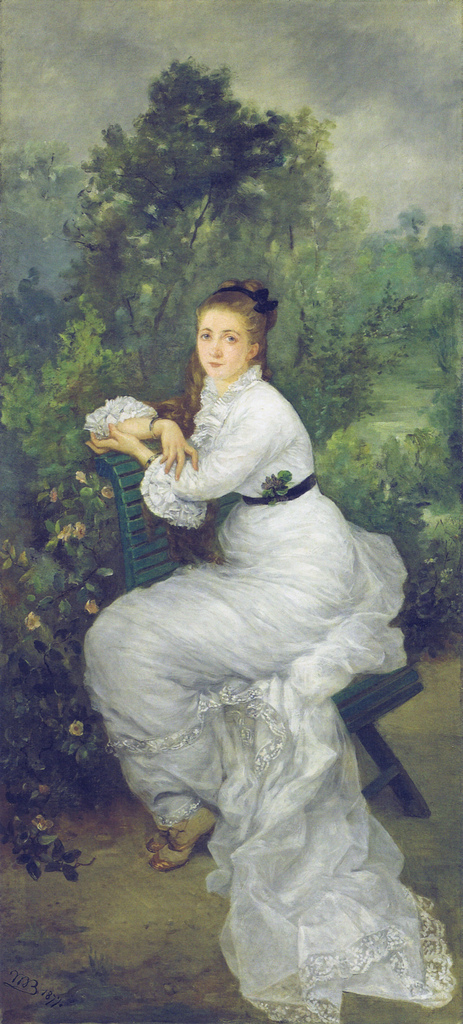
Woman in the Garden (1877). Private collection.

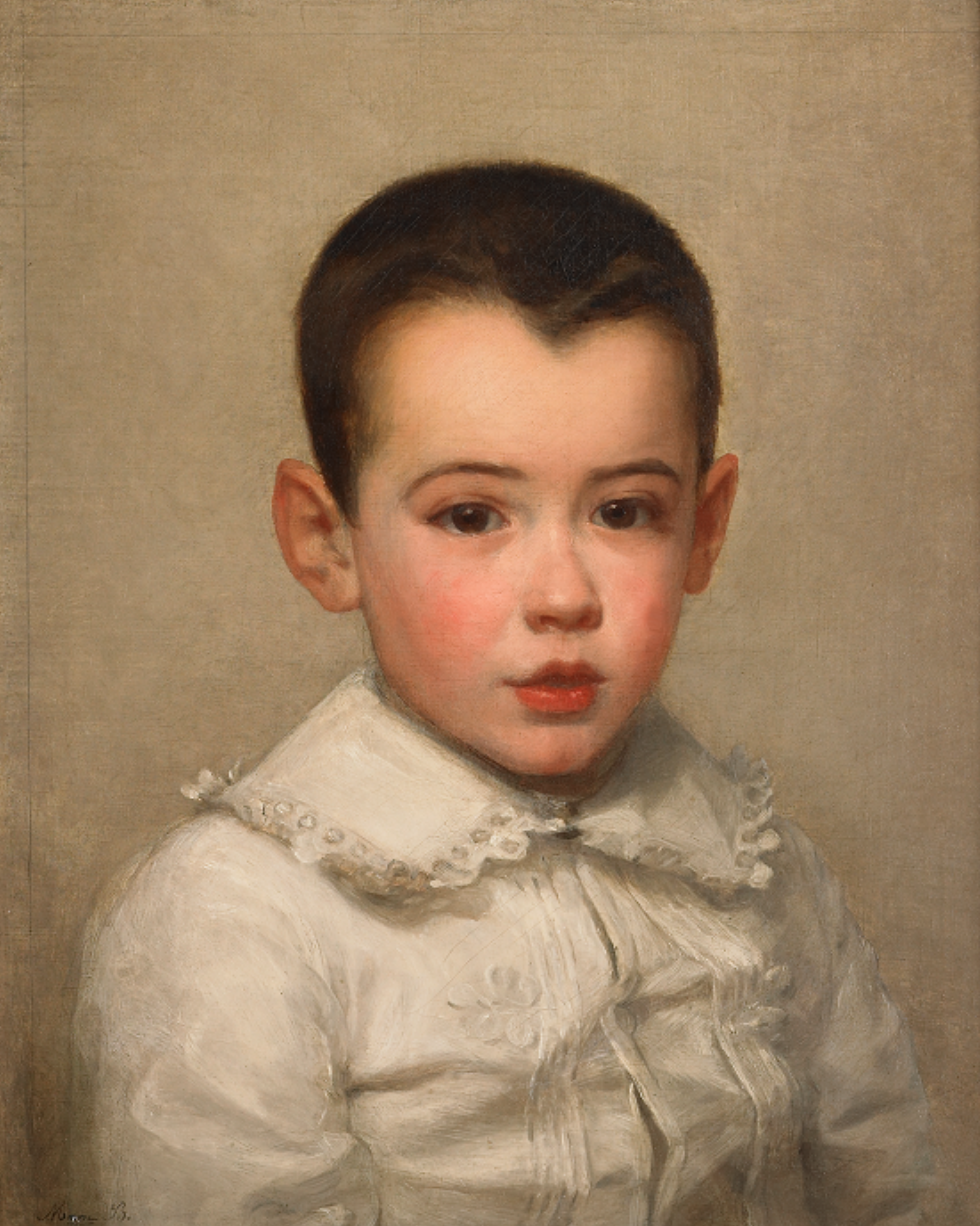
Pierre Bracquemond as a Child (1878). Musée des Beaux-Arts de Rouen, Normandy, France.

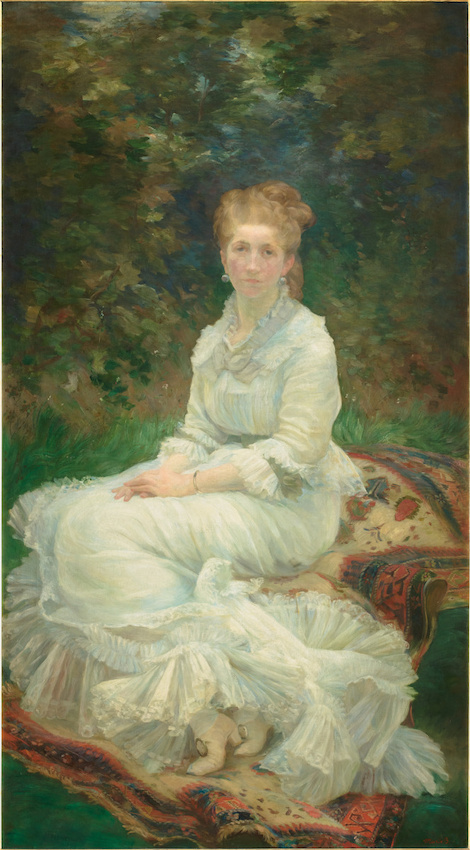
The Lady in White (1880). Musée d'Orsay.

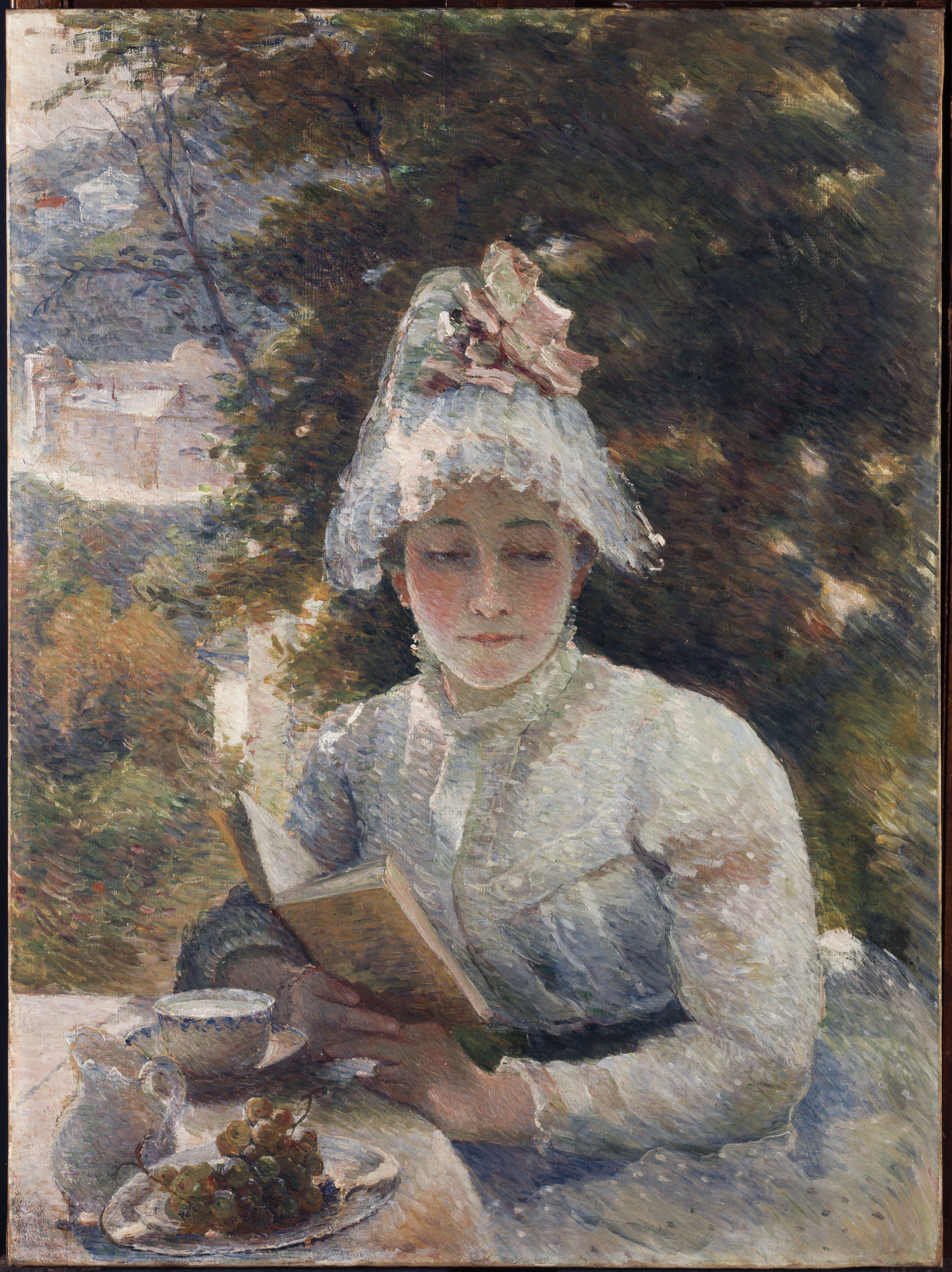
Afternoon Tea (1880). Petit Palais, Paris, France.

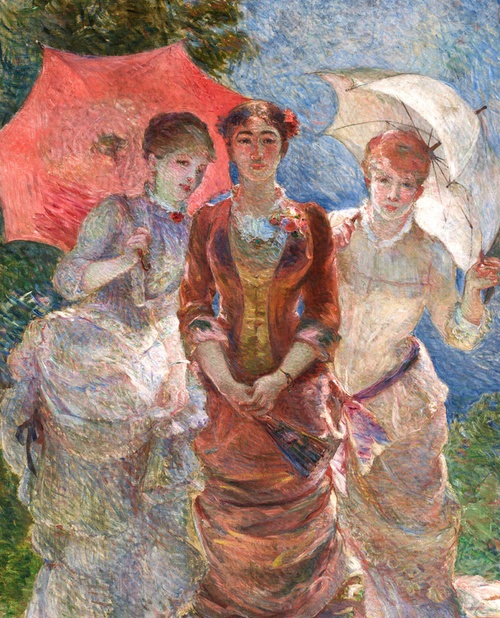
Three Women with Parasols (1880). Musée d'Orsay.

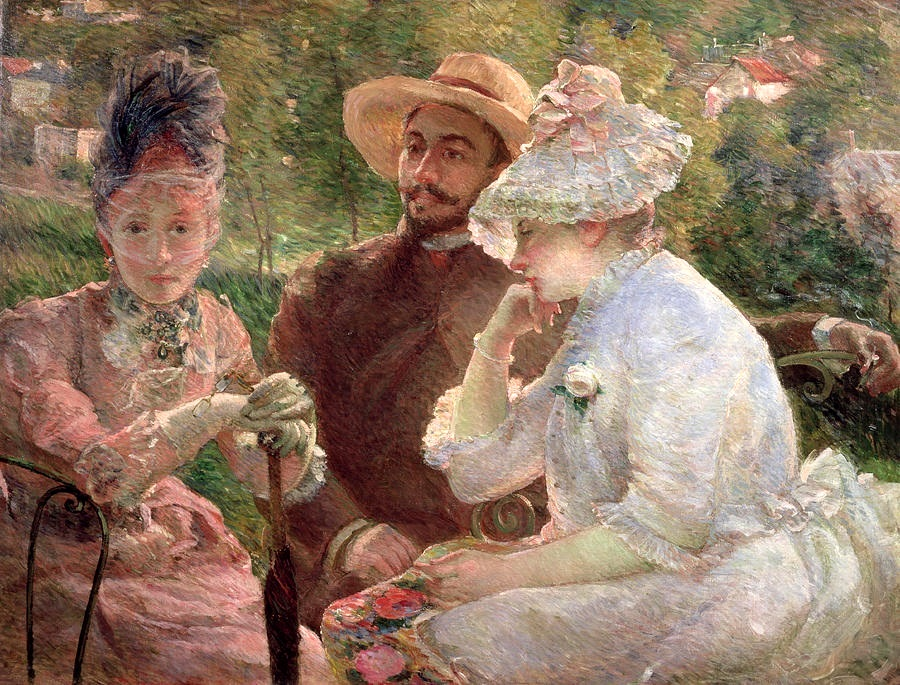
On the Terrace at Sèvres (1880). Musée du Petit Palais, Geneva, Switzerland; second copy at Artizon Museum, Ishibashi Foundation, Tokyo, Japan.

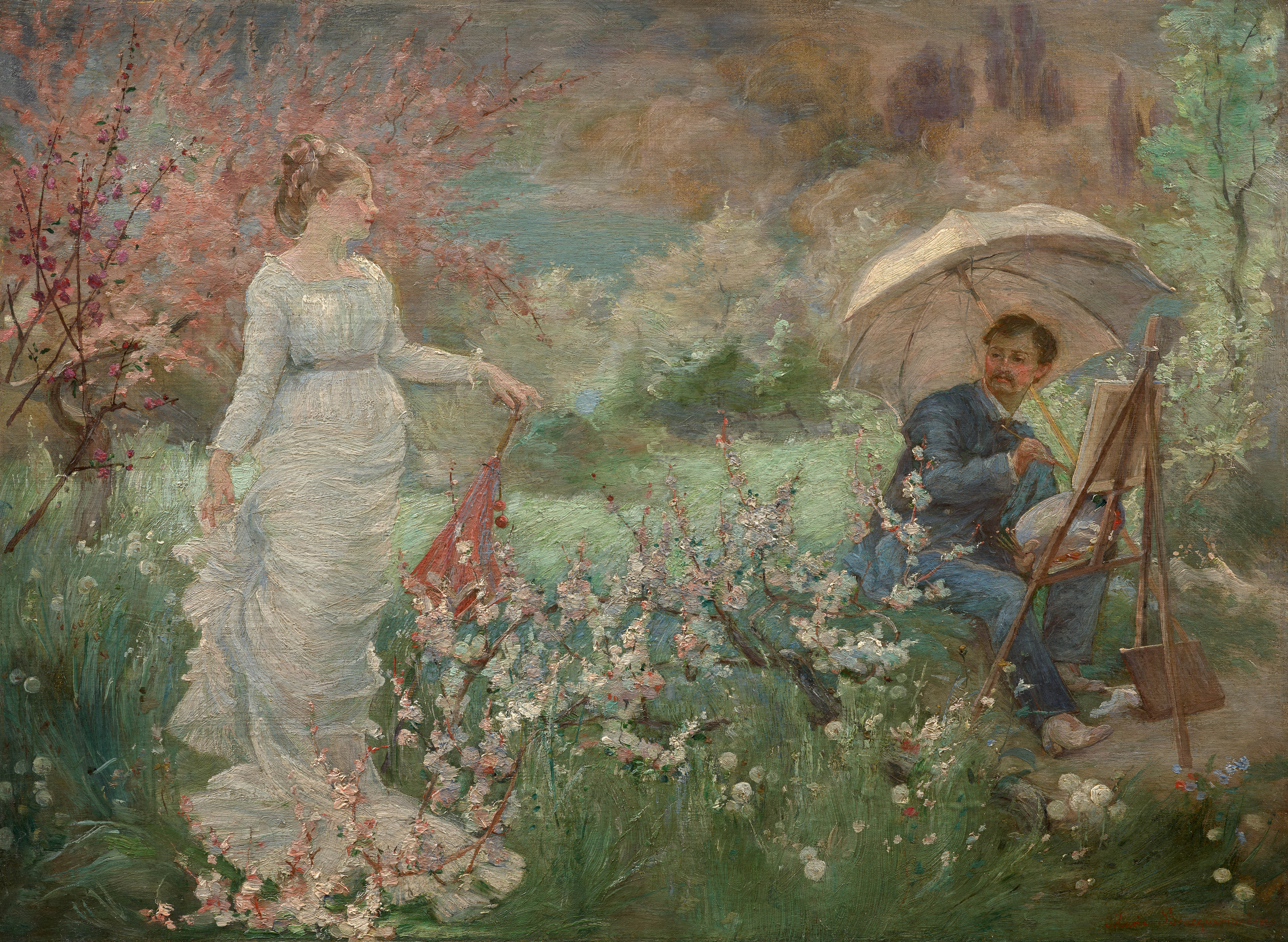
Study from Nature (1880). Private Collection.

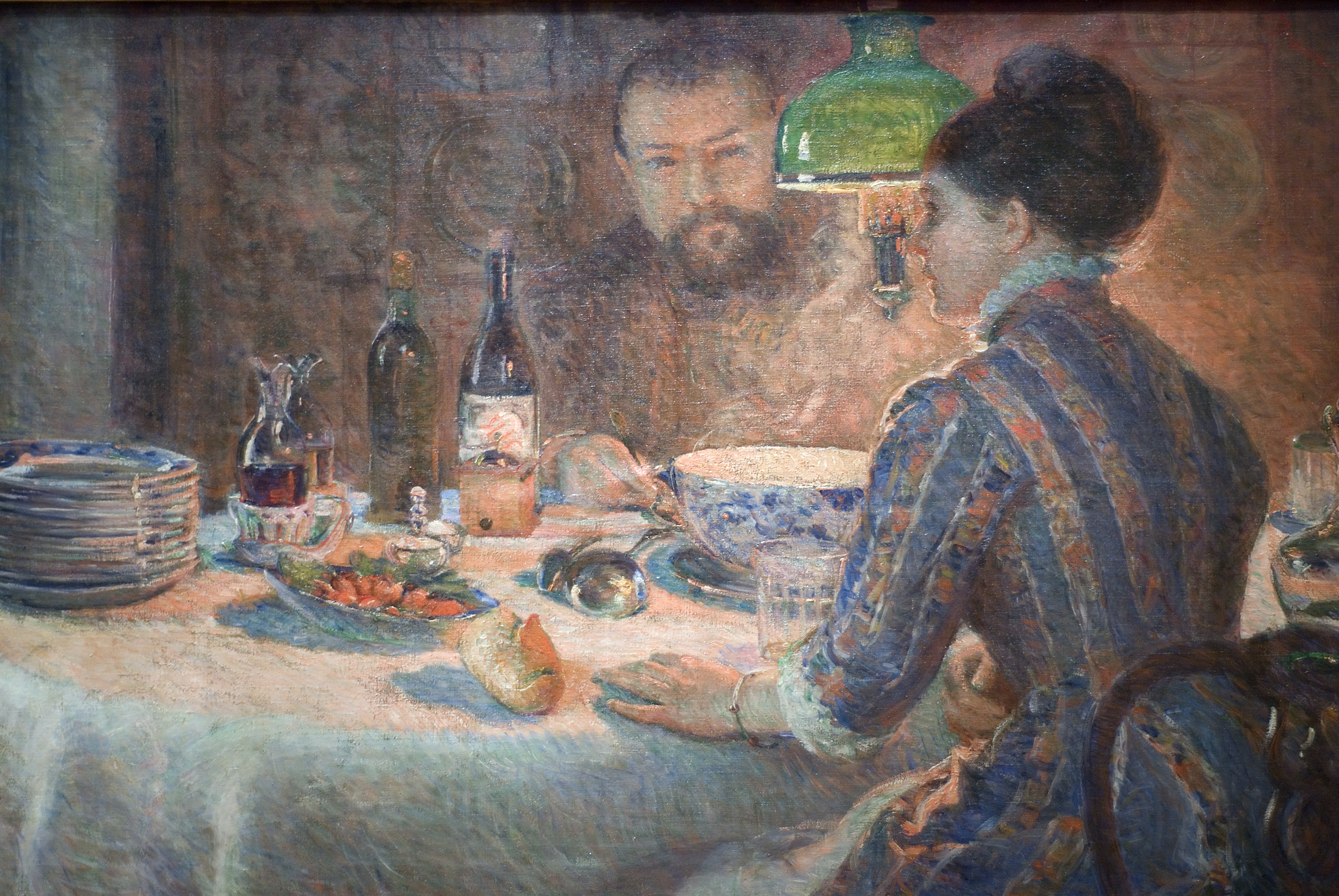
Under the Lamp (1887). Private collection.
Selected watercolors

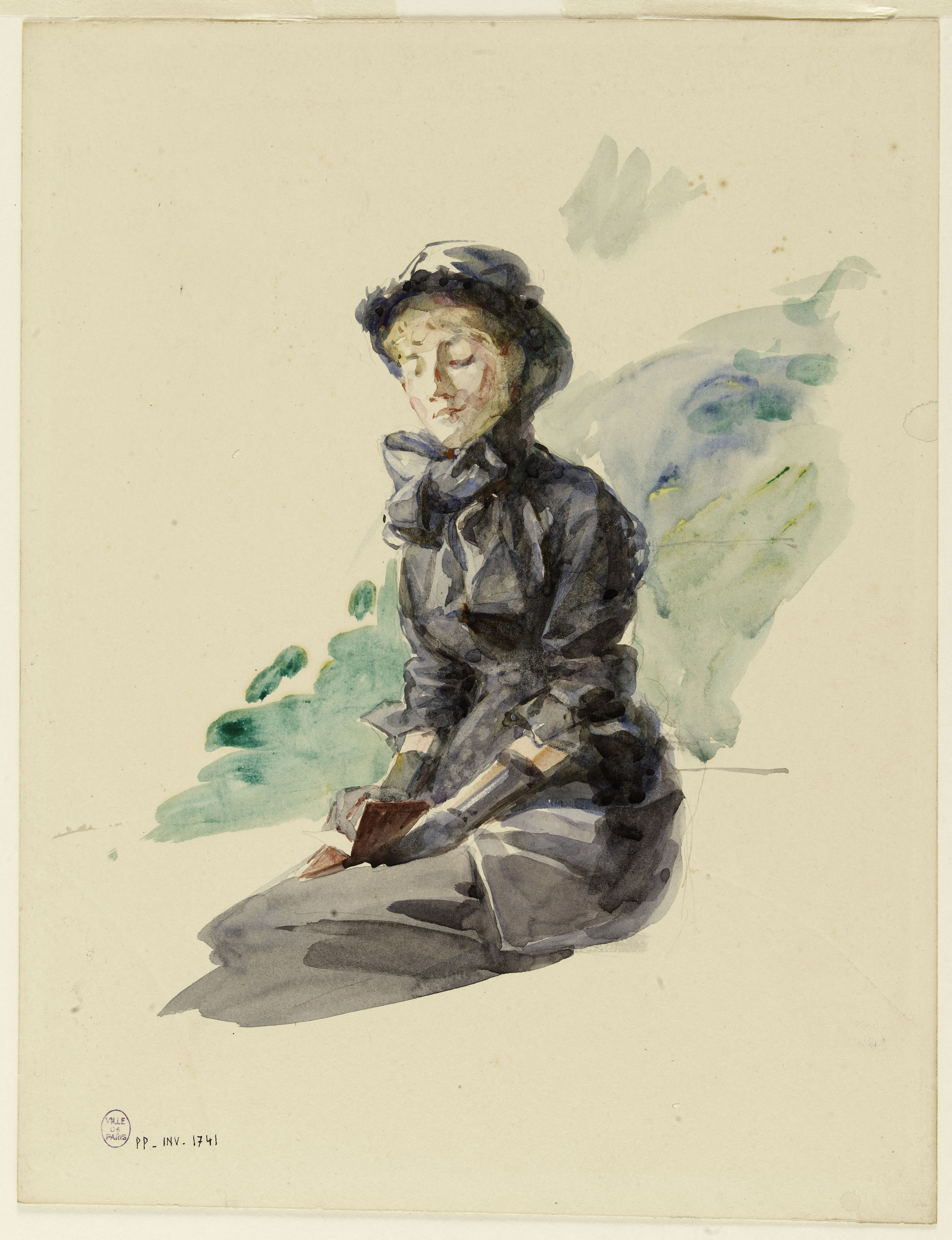
Femme assise. Undated. Petit Palais, musée des Beaux-arts de la Ville de Paris.

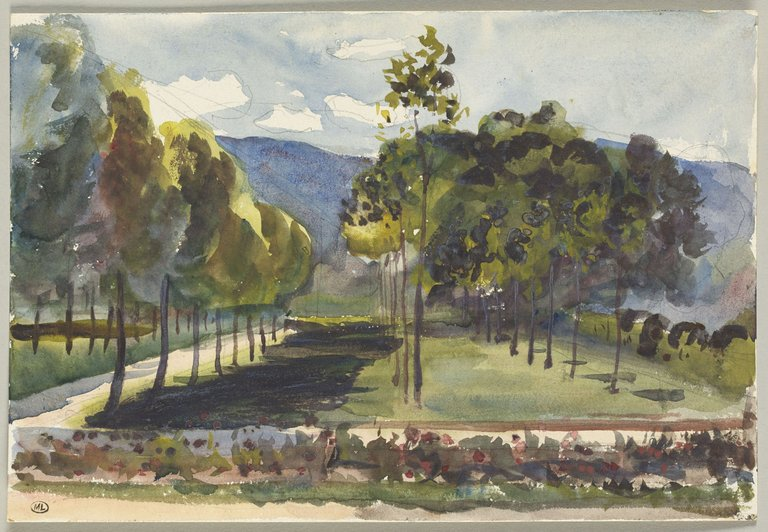
Landscape. Unknown date. Musée d'Orsay.

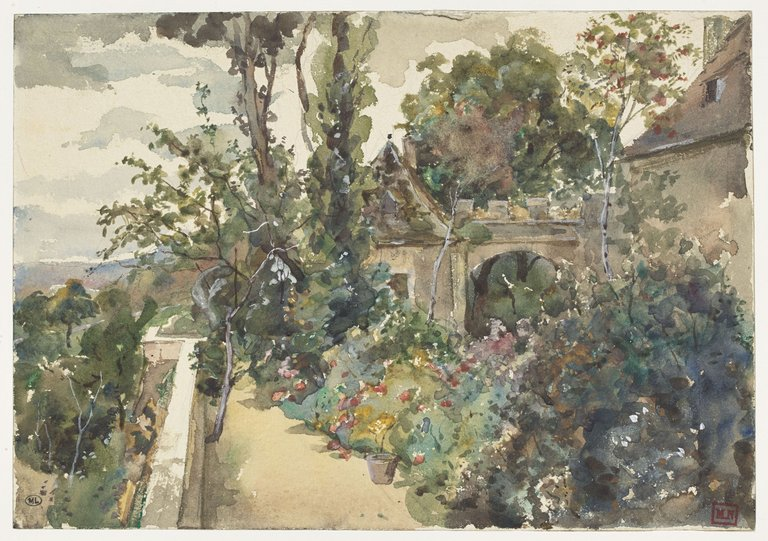
Terraced garden, overlooking the countryside. Unknown date. Musée d'Orsay.

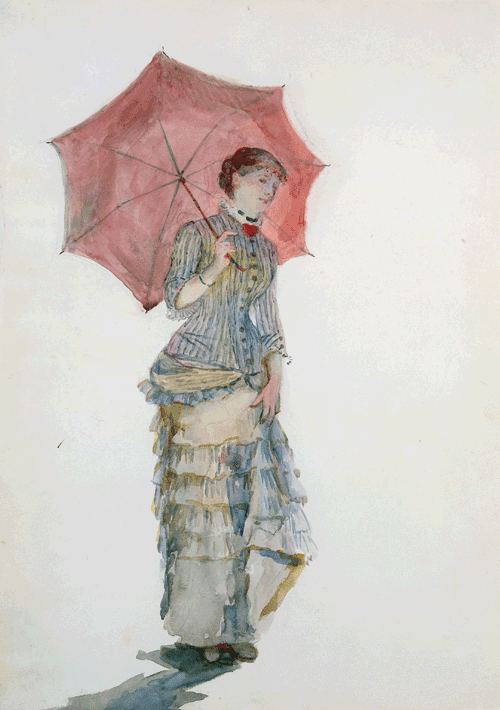
Woman with an Umbrella (1880). Private collection.
Selected Drawings

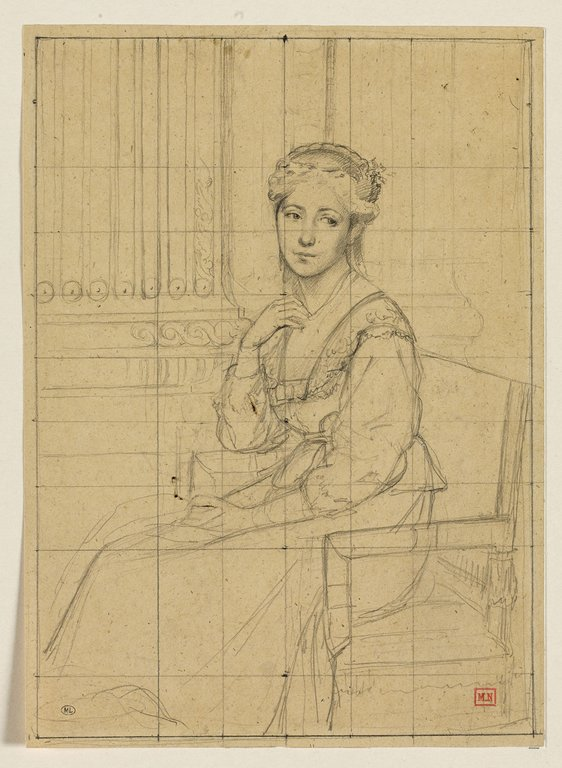
Portrait of the Artist's Sister (c. 1860)

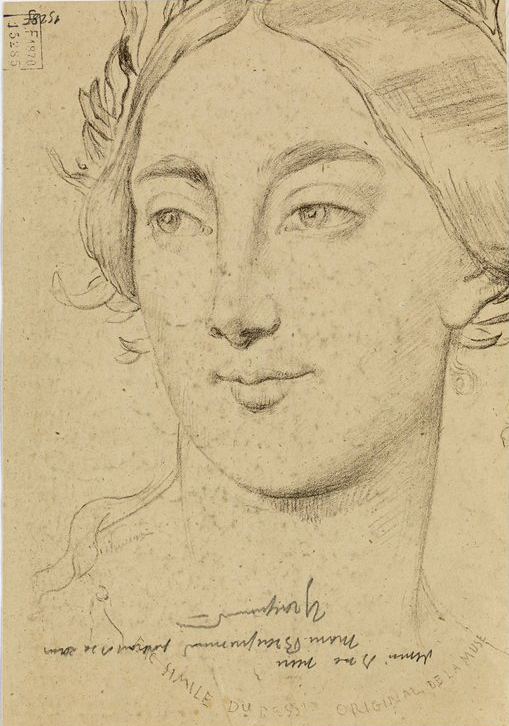
Head of a Muse (c. 1860)

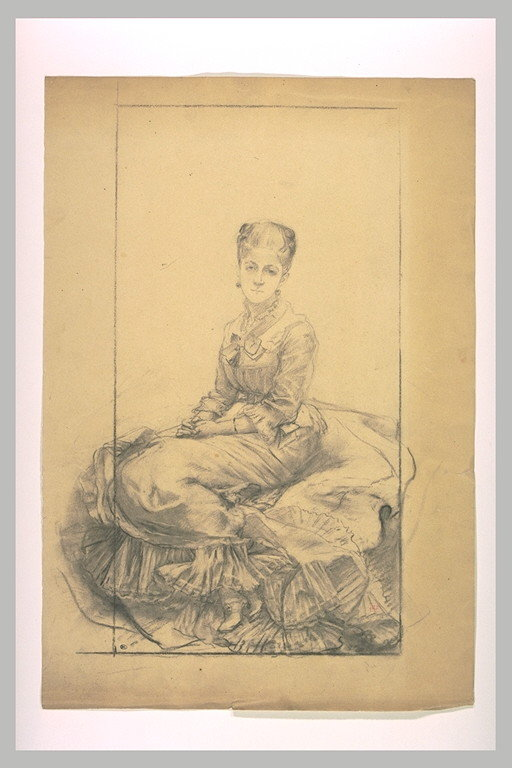
Study for The Lady in White. Undated.
Selected etchings

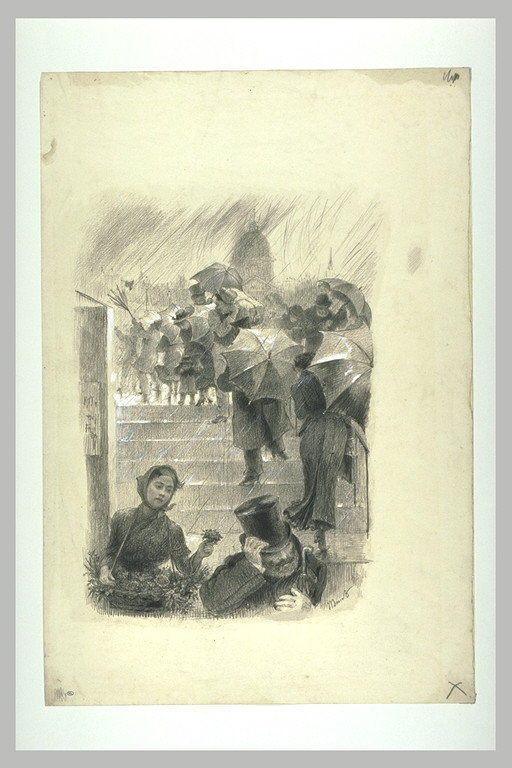
Les parapluies. Undated. Musée d'Orsay.

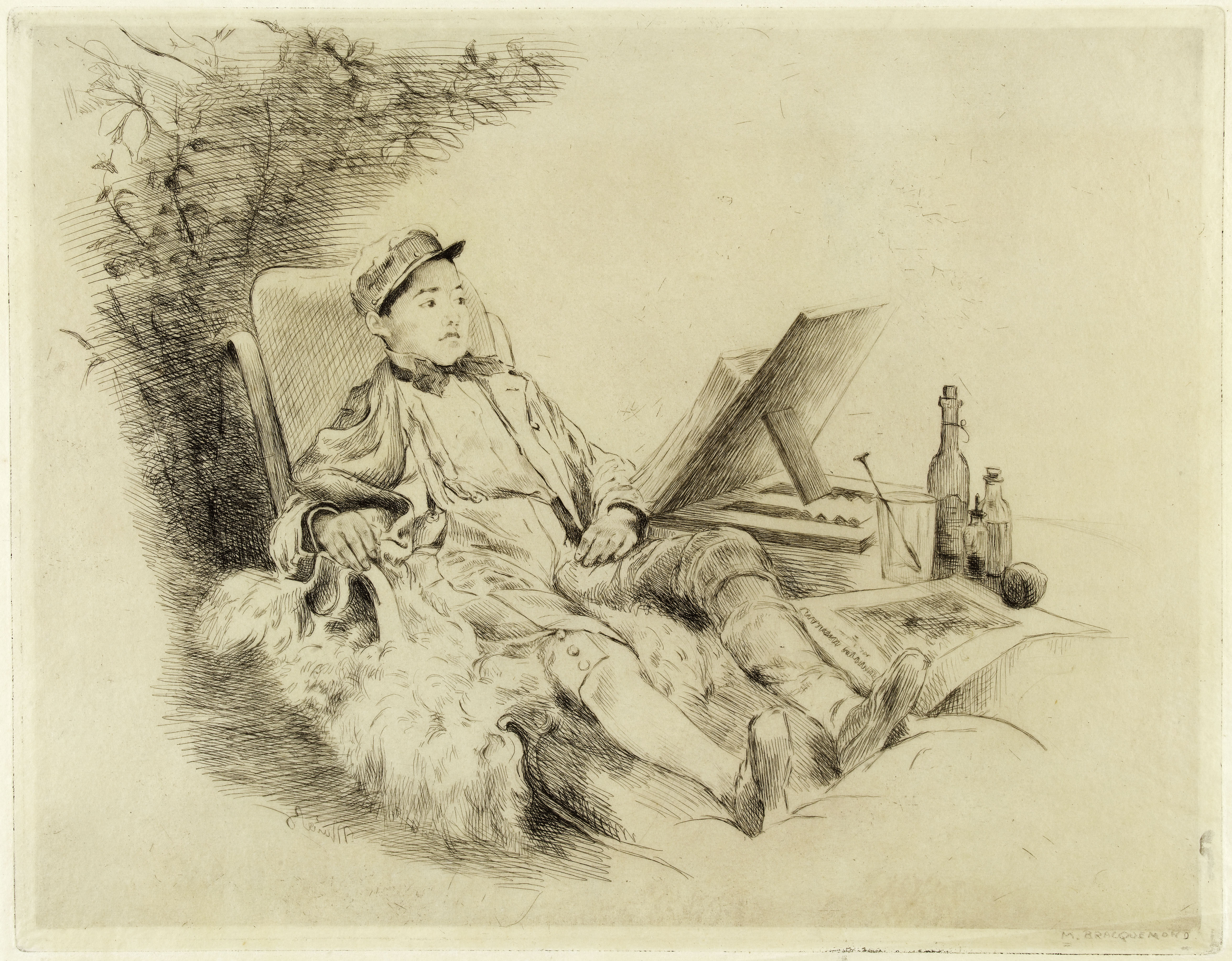
Le Petit malade. Undated. Musée des Beaux-arts de la Ville de Paris.

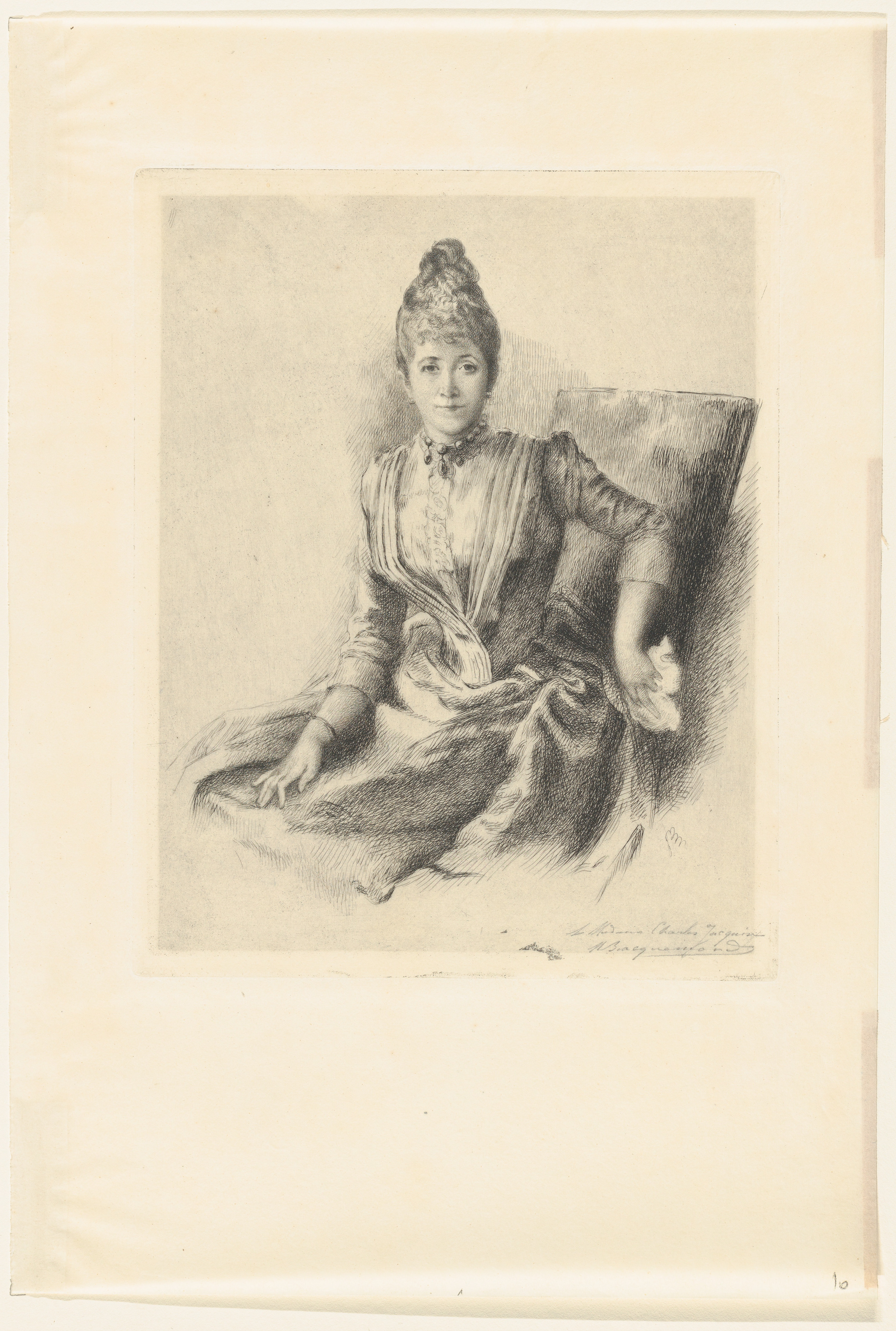
Portrait de M^{lle} Quivoron. Undated. Metropolitan Museum of Art.

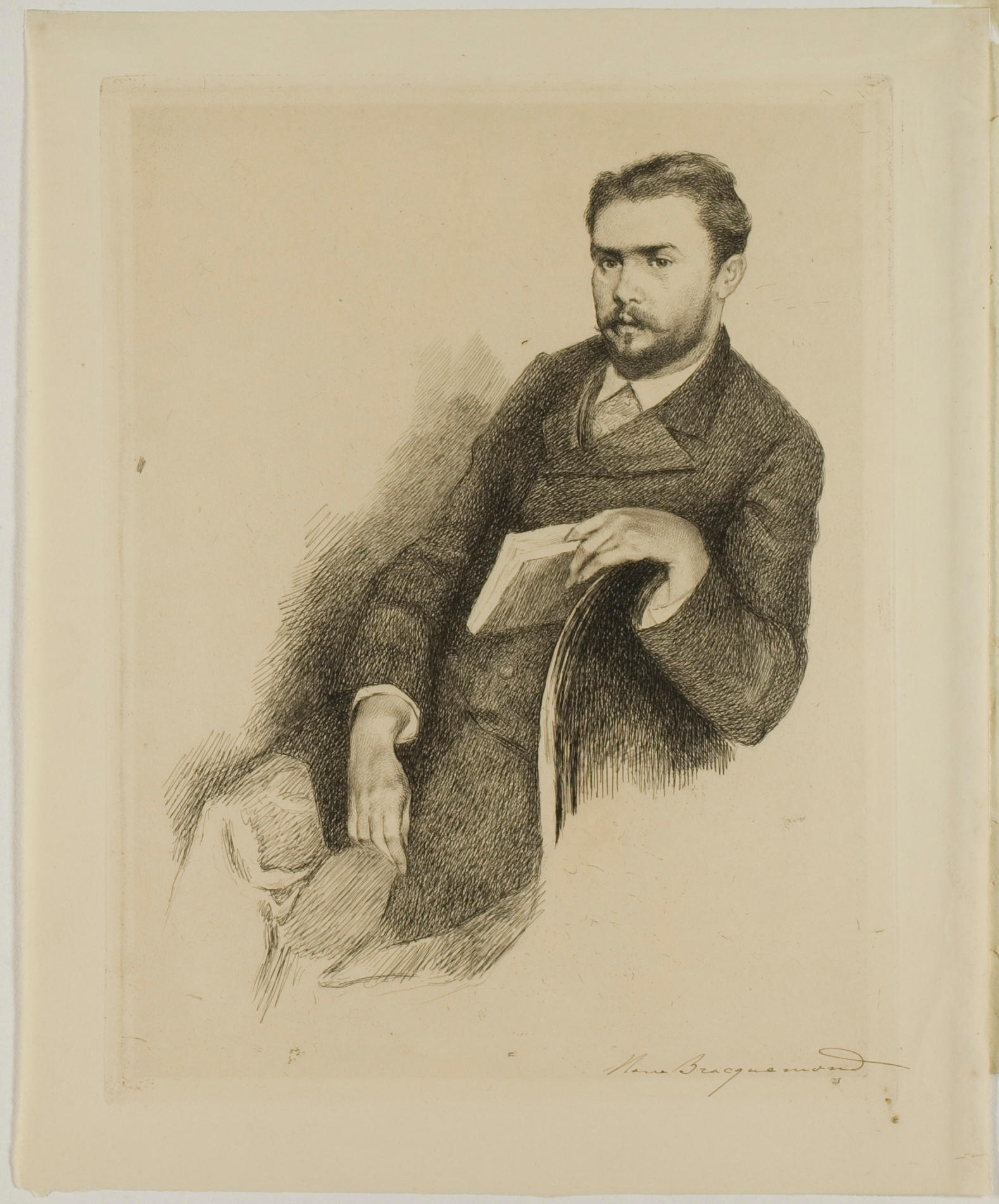
Portrait de Gustave Geffroy. Undated. Art Institute of Chicago.

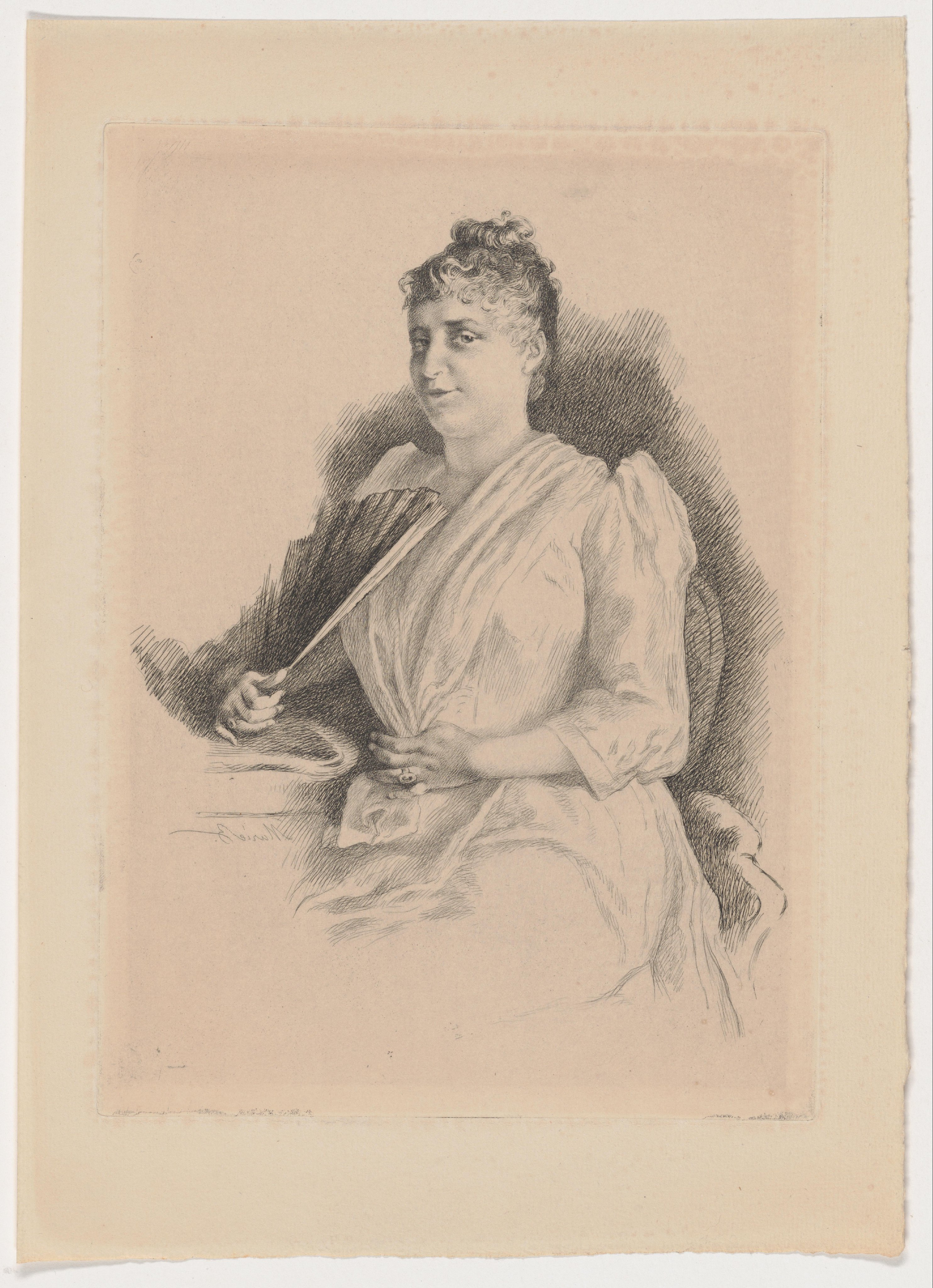
Portrait de Marie Bracquemond (1888). Philadelphia Museum of Art.
Selected ceramics

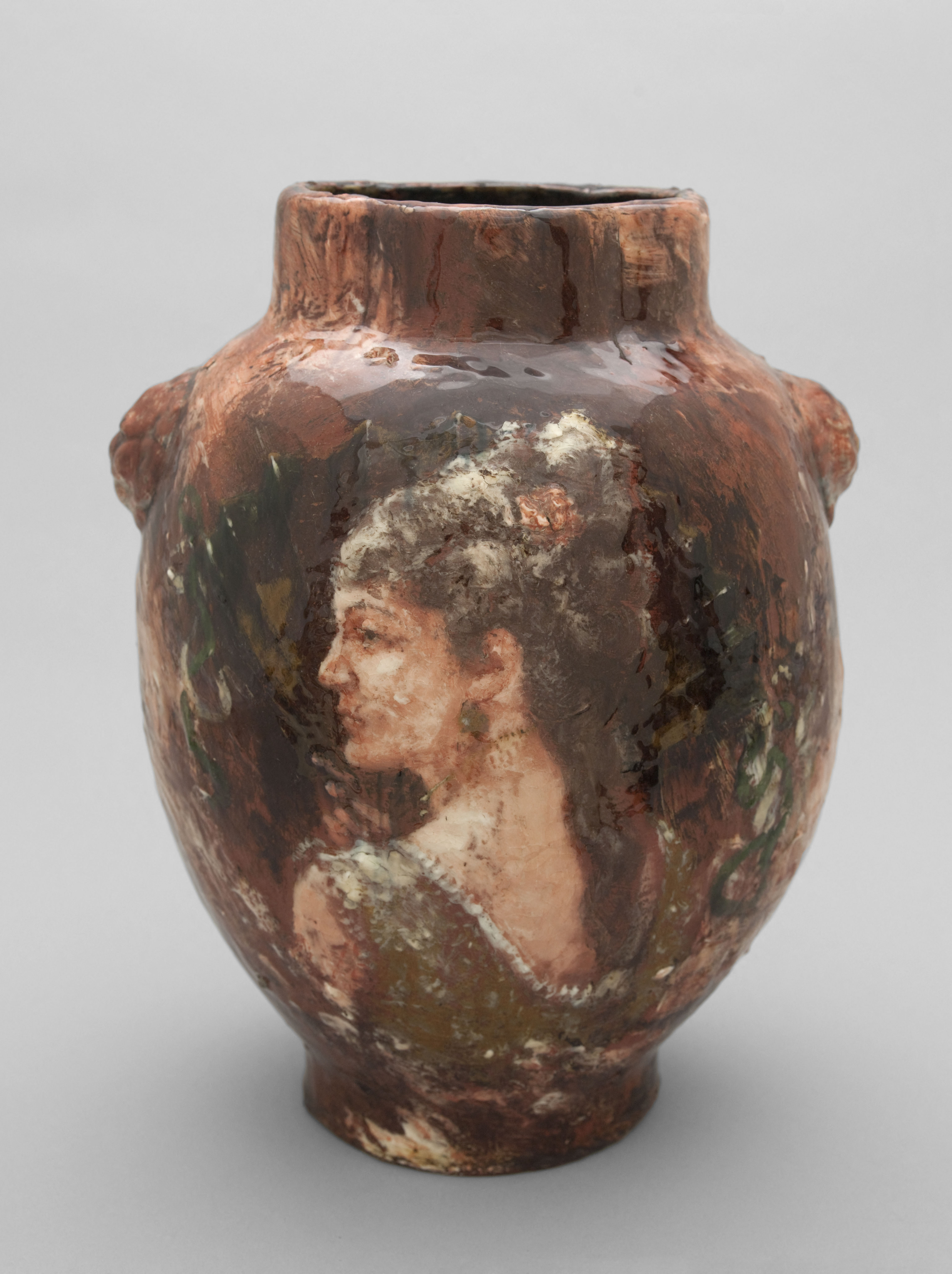
Vase. Undated. Musée des Beaux-arts de la Ville de Paris.

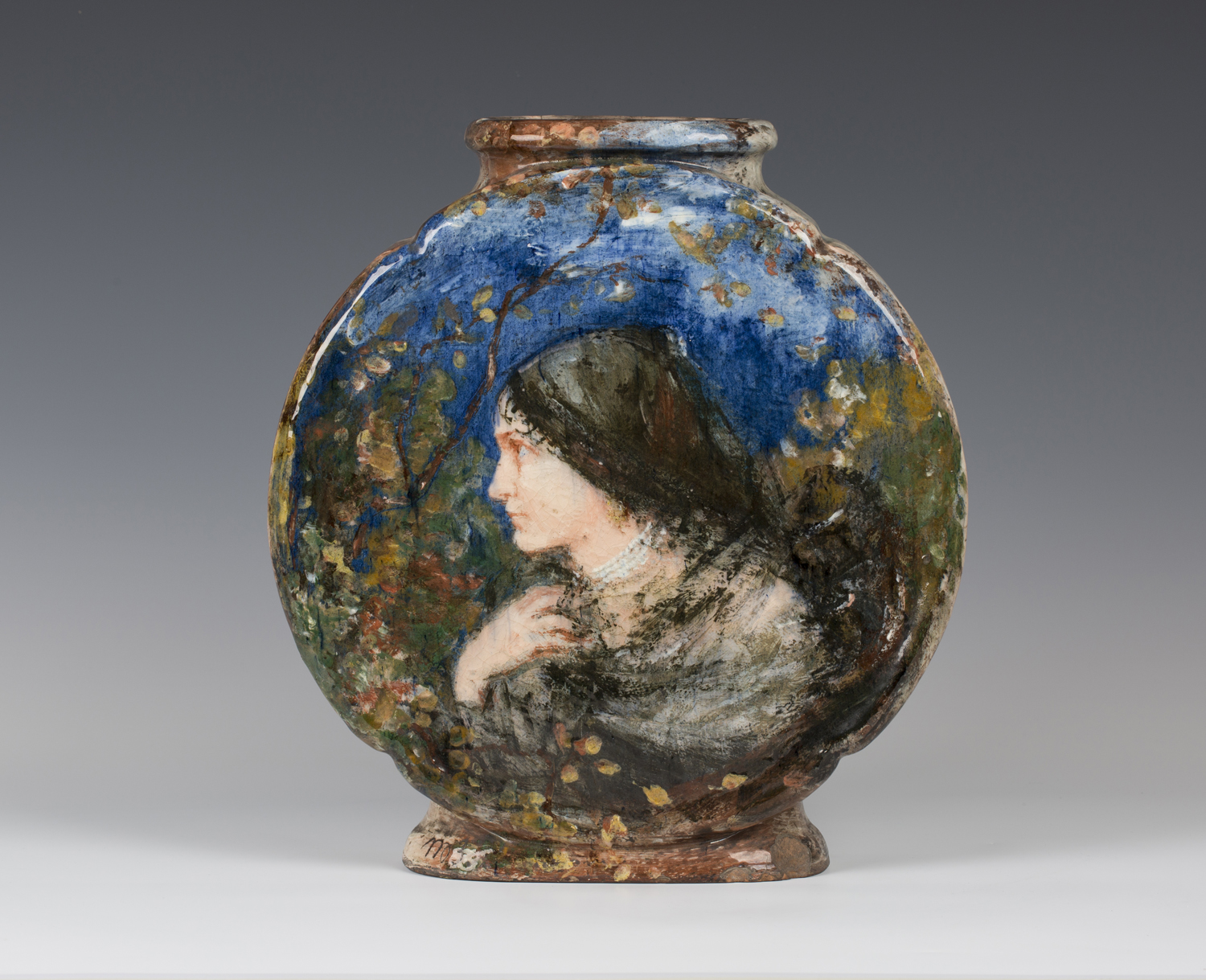
Haviland & Co. Limoges Céramique Impressioniste Barbotine French pottery vase. c. 1880. Private collection.

== Selected exhibitions ==
Selected Marie Bracquemond Exhibitions - Solo	Date
Paris, Bernheim-Jeune. Catalogue des peintres, aquarelles, dessins et eaux-fortes de Marie Bracquemond.	1919
Paris, Bernheim-Jeune.	1962
Group exhibitions	
Mortagne, Musée de Mortagne. Félix Bracquemond, 1833-1914: gravures, dessins, ceramiques. Marie Bracquemond, 1841-1916. tableaux. Also shown Chartres.	1972, May–September
Ann Arbor, University of Michigan, Museum of Art. The Crisis of Impressionism, 1878-1882. Included works by Marie and Félix Bracquemond, Cassatt, and Morisot, among many other Impressionist artists.	1979-80, November 2 - January 6
Paris, Musée d'Orsay. Women, art and power (Femmes, art et pouvoir)	2019-20, September 11 - January 20

== See also ==
- List of women artists exhibited at the 1893 World's Columbian Exposition
- Society of Modern Women Artists
