= Gustave Goetschy =

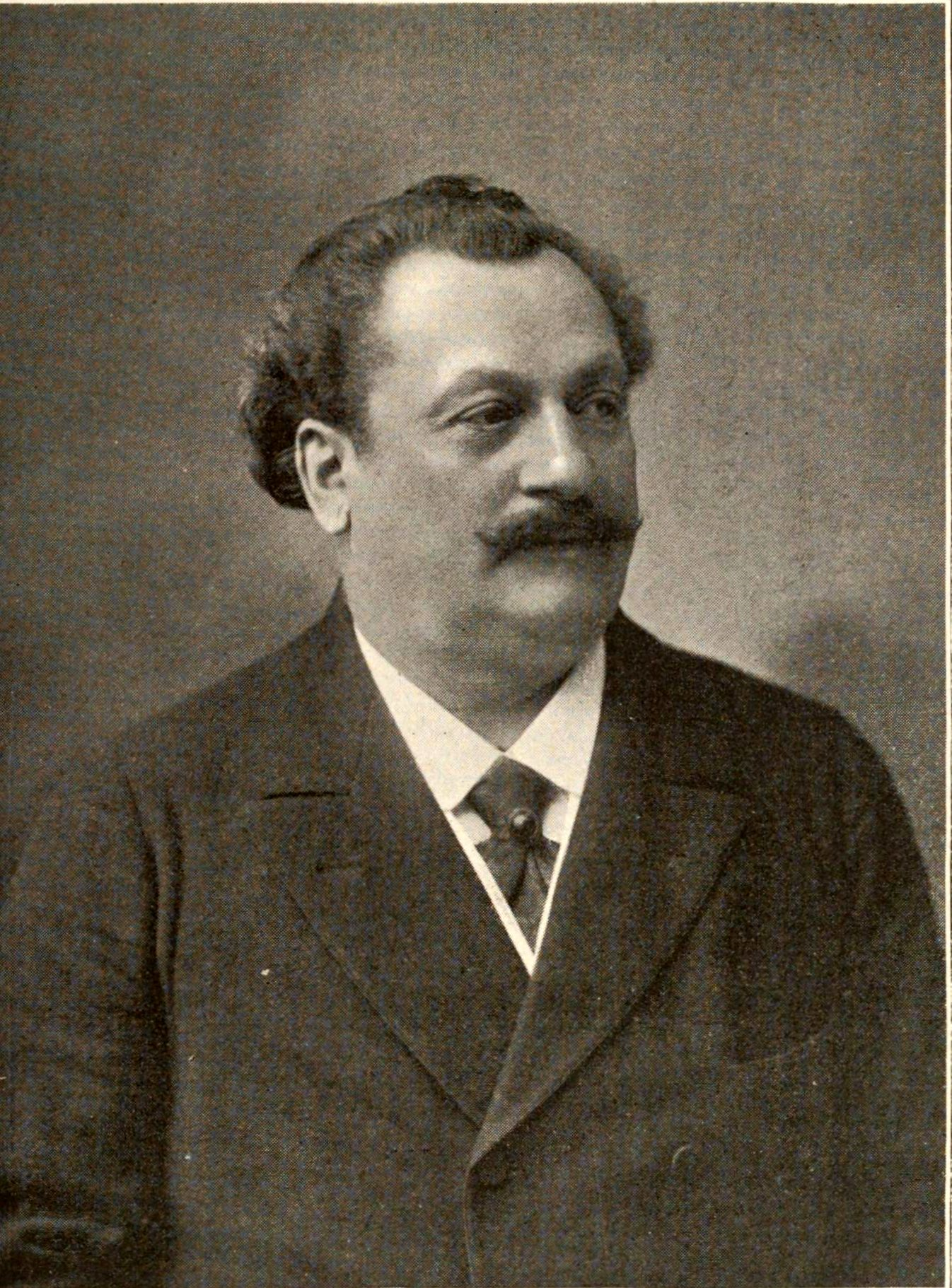
Gustave Goetschy, 1899

Henri Gustave Goetschy (13 September 1846 – 11 August 1902) was a French writer, journalist, art critic, and publication director.

== Early life ==
Henri Gustave Goetschy was born on September 13, 1846, in Percey, son of attorney Charles Pierre Goetschy (1807-1880), and Aglaé Lemaire (1827-1898). The Goetschys are from Porrentruy, Switzerland, where their grandfather, Jean-Joseph Goetschy (1751-1825), who was also a judge during the French Revolution, had founded a printing press.

== Career ==
In 1878, he published an essay with Ludovic Baschet, "Les Jeunes Peintres Militaires", dealing with Alphonse de Neuville, Édouard Detaille and Henri-Louis Dupray. In 1886, he prefaced a sales catalog of Neuville's works. Gustave Goetschy also wrote in the Revue illustrée, Le Voltaire and La Vie moderne. In 1881, he published a theatrical work, Our Professor, a monologue in one act.

In 1886, as an art critic for Le Matin, he launched Matin-Salon, an annual periodical devoted to Parisian painting salons. Two years later, he launched, in partnership with the gallery owner Georges Petit, the illustrated almanac Paris-Noël, in the same format, published every December. Gustave Goetschy was the director of the publication until 1902. The title was bought the following November by Alfred Edwards, founder of Le Matin, and his brother-in-law Jean-Baptiste Charcot.

In 1888, he also launched L'Illustré moderne, a "journal-library" offering chronicles on art, short stories and novels, a periodical which seemed to disappear in 1890.

He died in the 7th arrondissement of Paris on August 11, 1902.

== Publications ==
- Pressed for the Salon: Studio Scenes (1877)
- "Young Military Painters" (1878)
- Our Professor: A Monologue in One Act (1879)
- Catalog of watercolor paintings and drawings, weapons of war, military hairstyles and pieces of armament from the A. de Neuville workshop (1886)
- Berthe Bernay (1890)
