= Sons of Aegyptus =

Mythological figures

In Greek mythology, the sons of Aegyptus were the fifty progeny of the king of Egypt, Aegyptus. They married their cousins, the fifty daughters of Danaus, twin brother of Aegyptus. In the most common version of the myth, they were all killed except one, Lynceus, who was saved by his wife Hypermnestra on their wedding night.

== Apollodorus ==
The list in the Bibliotheca preserves not only the names of brides and grooms, but also those of their mothers. A lot was cast among the sons of Aegyptus to decide which of the Danaids each should marry except for those daughters born to Memphis who were joined by their namesakes, the sons of Tyria. According to Hippostratus, Aegyptus had these progeny by a single woman called Eurryroe, daughter of Nilus.

Apollodorus' list of the sons of Aegyptus
Aegyptus' Sons		Mother	Danaids	Mother of the Danaids	Aegyptus' Sons		Mother	Danaids	Mother of the Danaids
1	Lynceus	Argyphia	Hypermnestra	Elephantis	26	Chrysippus	Tyria	Chrysippe	Memphis
2	Proteus	Argyphia	Gorgophone	Elephantis	27	Eurylochus	Caliadne, a naiad	Autonoe	Polyxo, a naiad
3	Busiris	Argyphia	Automate	Europe	28	Phantes	Caliadne, a naiad	Theano	Polyxo, a naiad
4	Enceladus	Argyphia	Amymone	Europe	29	Peristhenes	Caliadne, a naiad	Electra	Polyxo, a naiad
5	Lycus	Argyphia	Agave	Europe	30	Hermus	Caliadne, a naiad	Cleopatra	Polyxo, a naiad
6	Daiphron	Argyphia	Scaea	Europe	31	Dryas	Caliadne, a naiad	Eurydice	Polyxo, a naiad
7	Istrus	Arabian woman	Hippodamia	Atlanteia or Phoebe, the Hamadryads	32	Potamon	Caliadne, a naiad	Glaucippe	Polyxo, a naiad
8	Chalcodon	Arabian woman	Rhodia	Atlanteia or Phoebe, the Hamadryads	33	Cisseus	Caliadne, a naiad	Antheleia	Polyxo, a naiad
9	Agenor	Arabian woman	Cleopatra	Atlanteia or Phoebe, the Hamadryads	34	Lixus	Caliadne, a naiad	Cleodore	Polyxo, a naiad
10	Chaetus	Arabian woman	Asteria	Atlanteia or Phoebe, the Hamadryads	35	Imbrus	Caliadne, a naiad	Evippe	Polyxo, a naiad
11	Diocorystes	Arabian woman	Hippodamia	Atlanteia or Phoebe, the Hamadryads	36	Bromius	Caliadne, a naiad	Erato	Polyxo, a naiad
12	Alces	Arabian woman	Glauce	Atlanteia or Phoebe, the Hamadryads	37	Polyctor	Caliadne, a naiad	Stygne	Polyxo, a naiad
13	Alcmenor	Arabian woman	Hippomedusa	Atlanteia or Phoebe, the Hamadryads	38	Chthonius	Caliadne, a naiad	Bryce	Polyxo, a naiad
14	Hippothous	Arabian woman	Gorge	Atlanteia or Phoebe, the Hamadryads	39	Periphas	Gorgo	Actaea	Pieria
15	Euchenor	Arabian woman	Iphimedusa	Atlanteia or Phoebe, the Hamadryads	40	Oeneus	Gorgo	Podarce	Pieria
16	Hippolytus	Arabian woman	Rhode	Atlanteia or Phoebe, the Hamadryads	41	Aegyptus	Gorgo	Dioxippe	Pieria
17	Agaptolemus	Phoenician woman	Pirene	Ethiopian woman	42	Menalces	Gorgo	Adite	Pieria
18	Cercetes	Phoenician woman	Dorion	Ethiopian woman	43	Lampus	Gorgo	Ocypete	Pieria
19	Eurydamas	Phoenician woman	Phartis	Ethiopian woman	44	Idmon	Gorgo	Pylarge	Pieria
20	Aegius	Phoenician woman	Mnestra	Ethiopian woman	45	Idas	Hephaestine	Hippodice	Herse
21	Argius	Phoenician woman	Evippe	Ethiopian woman	46	Daiphron	Hephaestine	Adiante	Herse
22	Archelaus	Phoenician woman	Anaxibia	Ethiopian woman	47	Pandion	Hephaestine	Callidice	Crino
23	Menemachus	Phoenician woman	Nelo	Ethiopian woman	48	Arbelus	Hephaestine	Oeme	Crino
24	Clitus	Tyria	Clite	Memphis	49	Hyperbius	Hephaestine	Celaeno	Crino
25	Sthenelus	Tyria	Sthenele	Memphis	50	Hippocorystes	Hephaestine	Hyperippe	Crino

== Hyginus ==
Gaius Julius Hyginus' list is partially corrupt and some of the names are nearly illegible. Nevertheless, it is evident that this catalogue has almost nothing in common with that of Pseudo-Apollodorus.

Hyginus' list of the sons of Aegyptus
Aegyptus' Sons		Danaids	Aegyptus' Sons		Danaids	Aegyptus' Sons		Danaids	Aegyptus' Sons		Danaids	Aegyptus' Sons		Danaids
1	Antimachus	Midea	11	Mineus	Myrmidone	21	Niauius	Glaucippe	31	Polydector	Oeme	41	Dolichus	Pirene
2	Panthius	Philomela	12	Canthus	Eurydice	22	Pamphilus	Demophile	32	Itonomus	Polybe	42	Hyperbius	Eupheme
3	Proteus	Scylla	13	Asterius	Cleo	23	Clytus	Autodice	33	Cassus	Helicta	43	Podasimus	Themistagora
4	Plexippus	Amphicomone	14	Xanthus	Arcadia	24	Aegyptus	Polyxena	34	Hyperantus	Electra	44	Aristonoos	Celaeno
5	Agenor	Evippe	15	Metalces	Cleopatra	25	Dryas	Hecabe	35	Demarchus	Eubule	45	Antiochus	Itea
6	Chrysippus	Demoditas	16	Philinus	Phila	26	Ecnomius	Acamantis	36	Pugno	Daplidice	46	Eudaemon	Erato
7	Perius	Hyale	17	Protheon	Hipparete	27	Ephialtes	Arsalte	37	Andromachus	Hero	47	Pelops	Danaïs
8	Enceladus	Trite	18	Asterides	Chrysothemis	28	Eurysthenes	Monuste	38	Athletes	Europome	48	Hermus	Cleopatra
9	Amyntor	Damone	19	Athamas	Pyrante	29	Midanus	Amymone	39	Plexippus	Pyrantis	49	Lynceus	Hypermnestra
10	Obrimus	Hippothoe	20	Armoasbus	?	30	Evidea	Helice	40	Antipaphus	Critomedia	50	?	?
