= Danaïdes =

In Greek myth, fifty sisters who slew their husbands

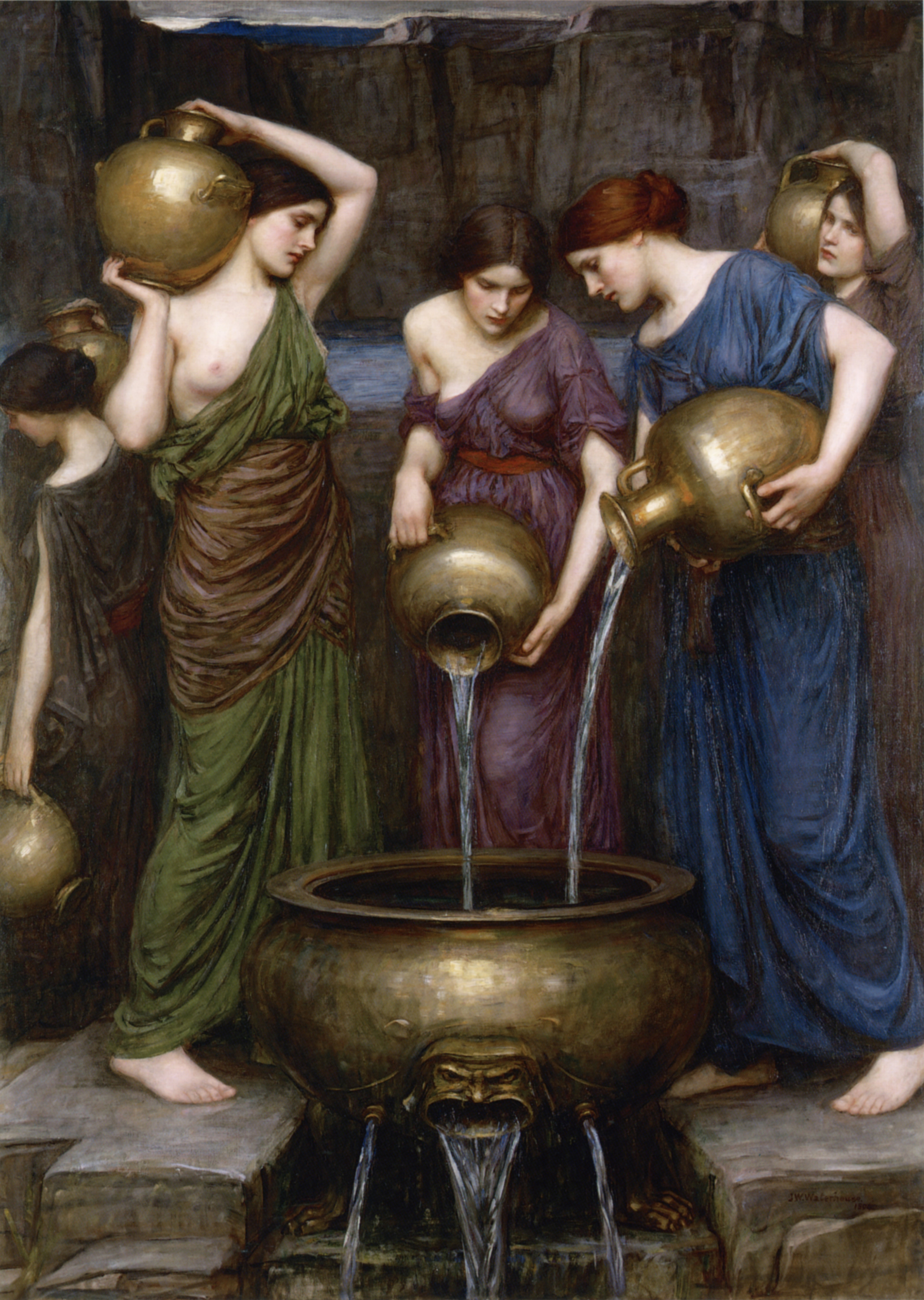
The Danaides (1904), a Pre-Raphaelite interpretation by John William Waterhouse

In Greek mythology, the Danaïdes (/dəˈneɪ.ɪdiːz/; Ancient Greek: Δαναΐδες, romanized: Danaídes, lit. 'daughters of Danaus', pronounced [da.na.í.deː]) also Danaides or Danaids, were the fifty daughters of Danaus, king of Libya. In the most common version of the myth, the daughters were forced to marry the sons of Danaus' brother Aegyptus. In retaliation, Danaus commanded them to kill their husbands on their wedding night, and all but one, Hypermnestra, obeyed. The Danaids were then condemned to spend eternity carrying water in a sieve or perforated jug.

The myth of the Danaids is found in numerous written accounts from antiquity, such as in the writings of Apollodorus, Pindar, and Pausanias. The names of the Danaids are inscribed in lists from Apollodorus and Hyginus, though they differ greatly.

== Sources from Antiquity ==
The most complete version of the Danaid myth is found in Apollodorus's Bibliotheca. The story was also documented by several other authors in ancient Greece and Rome, such as in Pindar's Pythian Odes, Pausanias' Description of Greece, and Hyginus's Fabulae. Aeschylus also devoted a dramatic trilogy to the subject, containing The Suppliants, The Egyptians, and The Danaids, or perhaps a tetralogy including Amymone. The Danaids are also the subject of an epic poem which has been lost, called the Danais.

In the Metamorphoses by Roman poet Ovid, the Danaids are referenced briefly as the “daughters of Belus”, or the Belides in some translations, after their grandfather Belus. They appear to Orpheus when he enters Hades, appearing alongside other mythical figures such as Sisyphus.

They also are referenced in Strabo’s Geography, where he describes how the Danaids discovered water underneath the region of Lerna, bringing wells to the previously waterless region surrounding Argos.

== Family ==
The Danaids were all daughters of Danaus, king of Libya. In most versions of the myth Danaus is said to be a son of Belus and Achiroe, however, in Euripides' version of the myth he is the son of Io. The Danaids grandfather, Belus, was a son of Poseidon, and ruled over a large territory in the middle east and Northern Africa, including Assyria, Egypt, Libya, and Arabia. Belus and Achiroe had three sons: Cepheus and twin brothers Danaus and Aegyptus.

Despite having the same father, the Danaids may have all been born of different women, though the names and number of women differ between authors. Apollodorus claims that six of the daughters were born to the naiad Polyxo; six to Pieria; two to Elephantis; four to Queen Europa; ten to the hamadryad nymphs Atlanteia and Phoebe; seven to an Aethiopian woman; three to Memphis; two to Herse, and lastly four to Crino. According to Hippostratus, all of the daughters were begotten by Europa, the daughter of the river god Nilus. In other accounts, Melia, daughter of King Agenor, was the mother of all the Danaids.

== Mythology ==
=== Danaus and Aegyptus ===
Danaus and his twin brother Aegyptus were given territories by their father to rule over. Danaus was chosen to be king of Libya, while Aegyptus was sent to rule the Kingdom of Arabia, which he later called Egypt, after himself. Both men fathered 50 children, with Danaus having 50 daughters (the Danaids) and Aegyptus having 50 sons. When their father died, Aegyptus and Danaus fought over his inheritance. Disguising it as a form of truce, Aegyptus proposed marriages between all their children. However Danaus suspected his brother had a plan to overthrow him and his kingdom, and therefore refused the marriage proposal. Under the advice of Athena, he built a boat and fled Egypt with his daughters, sailing out of Chemmis.

Danaus and the Danaids sailed to Rhodes, where there they set up a monument to honor Athena Lindia. In some versions, the Daniads were the ones to build the temple at the site. After being in Rhodes, they sailed to the coast of Apobathmi, a location not far from Lerna and Argos.

=== Arrival in Argos ===
After arriving in Argos, Danaus declared that he was divinely chosen by Athena to rule Argos. The current king of Argos, King Pelasgus, did not believe him. Even so, Pelasgus got together an assembly to discuss Danaus' claim to the throne. Unsure how to decide, they agreed to reconvene in the morning. However, after seeing a wolf killing a bull the next morning, Pelasgus feared this was an omen that Danaus would take over Argos with violence, and therefore vacated the throne peacefully.

During Danaus' rule, a drought ravaged Argos. Previously, Poseidon had dried up all the springs around Argos due to Inachus, the first king of Argos, making a sacrifice to Hera and claiming the lands belonged to her instead of Poseidon, whose cult preceded hers in the region. One day, one of the Danaids, Amymone, was sent out to fetch water. While out, she fell asleep and was attacked by a satyr. Seeing this, Poseidon intervened and scared the satyr away by throwing his trident; it became lodged in a rock. Poseidon questioned why she was there, and after she told him she was fetching water, he had Amymone remove his trident from the rock, where a spring then gushed forth. This fountain, river, or spring created by and named after Amymone is mentioned by multiple ancient authors including Pliny, Ovid, and Apollodorus. They claim the spring is near to the lake of Lerna where the hydra lived.

=== Marriages of the Danaids ===
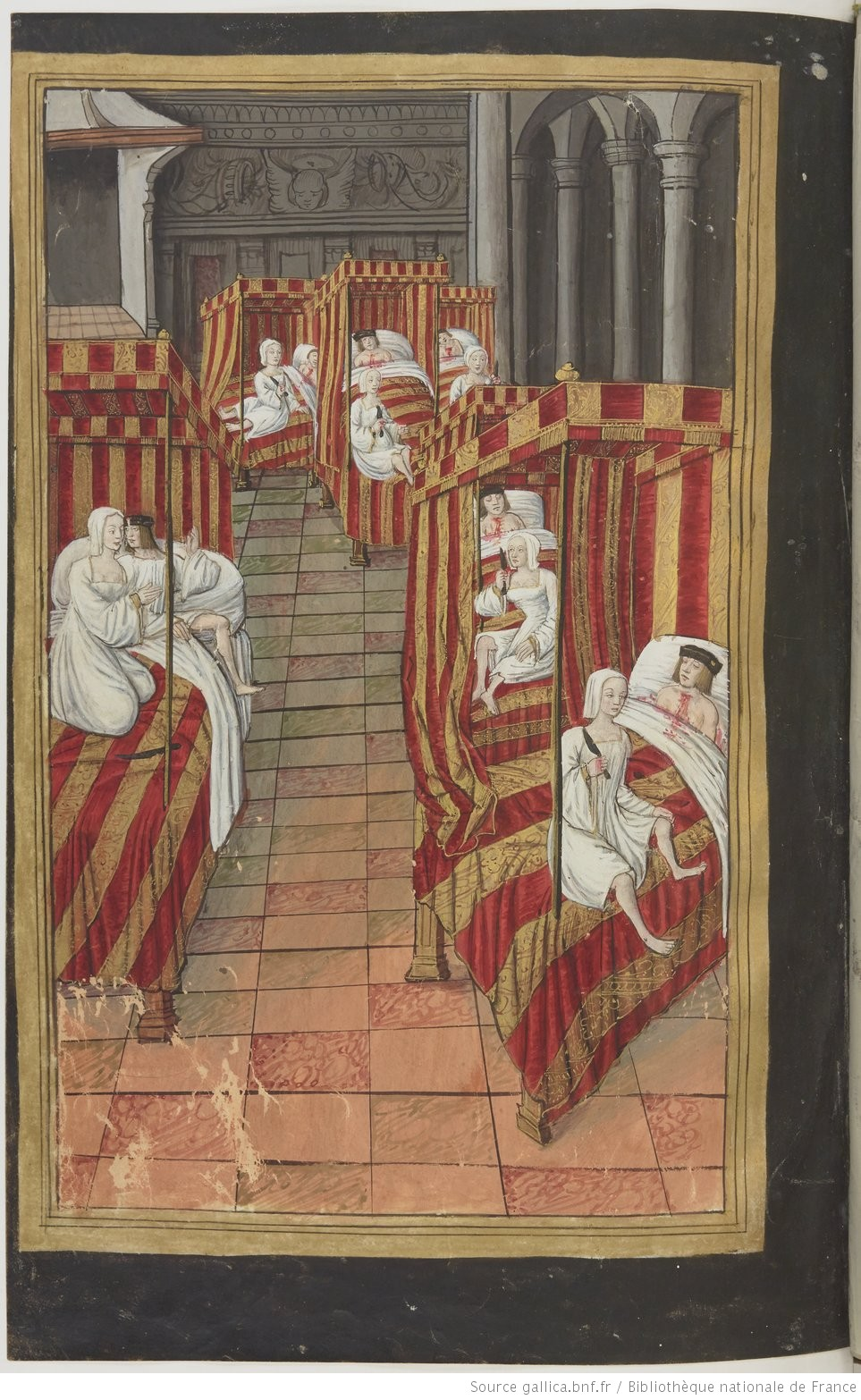
The Danaïdes kill their husbands, miniature by Robinet Testard

Meanwhile, Aegyptus was enraged by his brother's betrayal. He organized an army led by all his sons, and sent them to Argos with the command that they should not return until either Danaus was dead or he had consented to let the brothers marry the Danaids. Danaus, facing a probable loss and wanting to protect the Argives, agreed to let the brothers marry his daughters in a large wedding feast where every couple was married on the same night. However, Danuas gave all the Danaids daggers, and instructed them to cut off their husband's heads after they had fallen asleep on their wedding night and bring the heads to him as proof of their deaths. The Danaids all followed their father's command except one: Hypermnestra, who spared her husband Lynceus because he respected her desire to remain a virgin. After sparing her husband, Hypermnestra helped Lynceus flee back to safety either with his father in Egypt or to Lynceia, a city in the Argolid. Occasionally, Amymone and/or Bryce (Bebryce) are instead named as the Danaids who defied Danaus.

Danaus was enraged that his daughter refused to do as he ordered, so he imprisoned her and tried her in the Argive courts. In Euripides' version of the myth, Lynceus killed Danaus and his daughters as revenge for the death of his brothers. However, Apollodorus instead has Danaus uniting Hypermnestra and Lynceus, and later passing the kingdom to his son-in-law.

Apollodorus claims the heads of the murdered husbands were buried at Lerna, where the Danaids carried out funeral rites in front of the city. In this version, Athena and Hermes then purified the ground at the command of Zeus. However, Pausanias claims the heads were instead buried at Larisa, and the headless bodies were buried in Lerna.

==== After the Murders ====
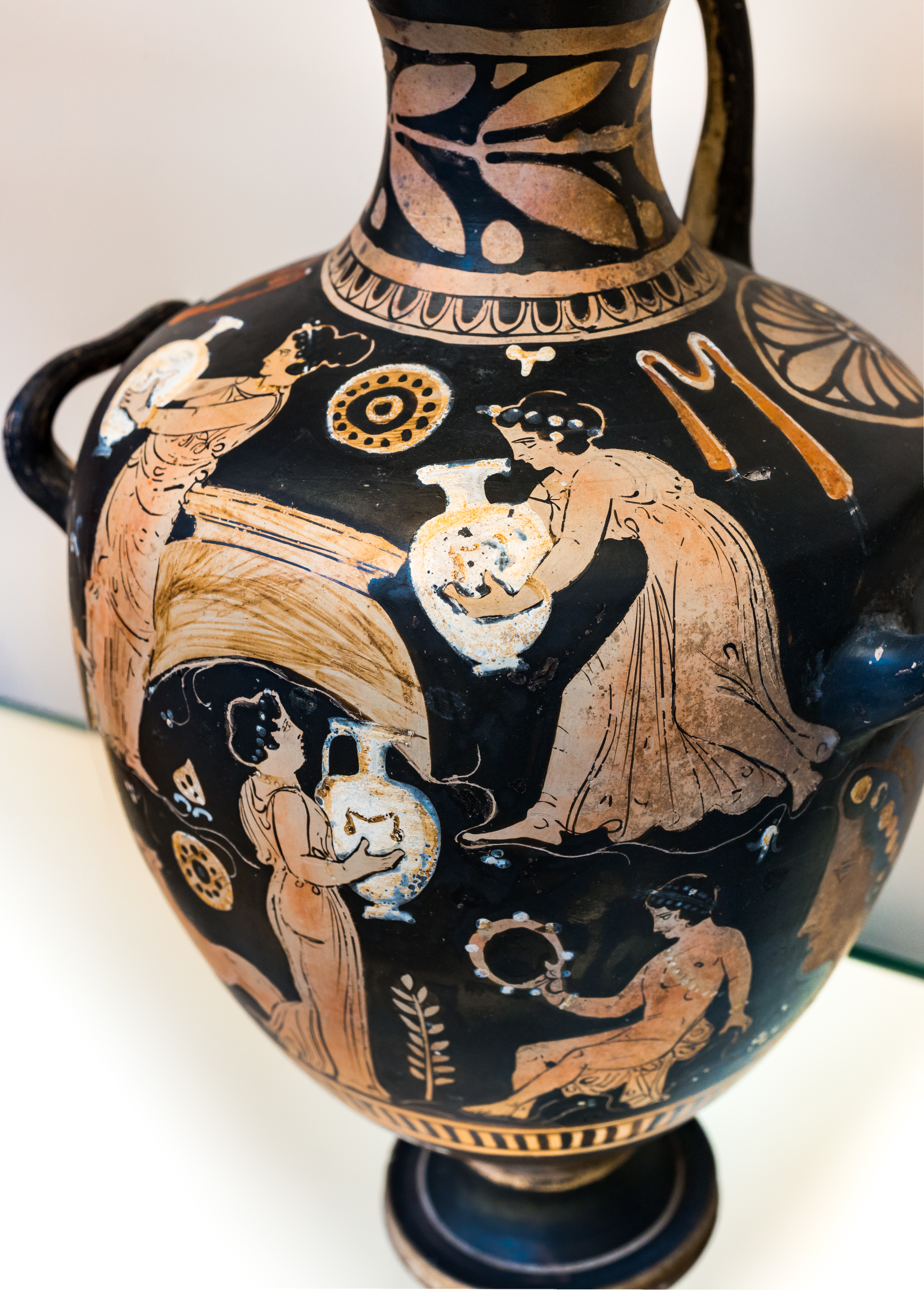
The Danaids filling the pithos, on a Campanian red-figure hydria attributed to the Danaid Painter, c. 340 – c. 320 BC (British Museum, London)

Afterwards, the Danaids were said to be remarried through athletic contests, specifically footraces. Pindar claimed that Danaus would place one of his daughters at the end of a racecourse, and arrange for the suitors to race towards her. The first man to touch her robes could then marry her. Pausanias instead wrote that Danaus had great difficulty in marrying off his daughters due to their crime, so he sent out a notice that he would give away his daughters without bride-gifts, and that each suitor could choose whichever daughter pleased him most. He then held a footrace where participants were able to choose their wives according to the order in which they finished. Races were carried out until every daughter was chosen.

Some accounts tell that their punishment in Tartarus was being forced to carry a jug to fill a pithos without a bottom (or with a leak) to wash their sins off. Because the water constantly leaked, they would forever try to fill the pithos without succeeding.

== Scholarship and interpretation ==
Across generations of scholarship, and to the present day, there have been numerous interpretations of the myth of the Danaids' meaning and purpose. In the Renaissance, humanist Boccaccio interpreted the myth to be a cautionary tale against the vanity of women, using the punishment of the Daniads in the underworld as evidence.

Scholars have interpreted the myth as an origin of natural phenomena in the Lerna region, particularly the springs. In 1894, Ludwig Preller published Griechische Mythologie in which he interpreted the Danaids as nymphs and their husbands as the springs. Preller described how the Danaids murdered the springs each year, explaining this as the Greek mythological reasoning for the drying up of the springs during the summer. Scholars further found evidence that the myth served this purpose, including Amymone among the Danaids. However, this interpretation is not widely accepted today.

Other scholars, such as Richard Buxton, have interpreted the myth of the Danaids as a tale that represents a woman’s role in relation to her father and her husband. The Danaids must choose whom to protect, their father or their newly betrothed, and all but Hypermnestra chose their father.

== The Danaïds and their husbands ==
=== Apollodorus ===
The list in the Bibliotheca preserves not only the names of brides and grooms but also those of their mothers. A lot was cast among the sons of Aegyptus to decide which of the Danaids each should marry, except for those daughters born to Memphis who were joined by their namesakes, the sons of Tyria. According to Hippostratus, Danaus had all these progenies begotten by a single woman, Europa, the daughter of Nilus.

Apollodorus' list of Danaids
No.	Danaids	Mother	Aegyptus' sons	Mother	No.	Danaids	Mother	Aegyptus' sons	Mother
1	Hypermnestra	Elephantis	Lynceus	Argyphia	26	Chrysippe	Memphis	Chrysippus	Tyria
2	Gorgophone	Elephantis	Proteus	Argyphia	27	Autonoe	Polyxo, a naiad	Eurylochus	Caliadne, a naiad
3	Automate	Europe	Busiris	Argyphia	28	Theano	Polyxo, a naiad	Phantes	Caliadne, a naiad
4	Amymone	Europe	Enceladus	Argyphia	29	Electra	Polyxo, a naiad	Peristhenes	Caliadne, a naiad
5	Agave	Europe	Lycus	Argyphia	30	Cleopatra	Polyxo, a naiad	Hermus	Caliadne, a naiad
6	Scaea	Europe	Daiphron	Argyphia	31	Eurydice	Polyxo, a naiad	Dryas	Caliadne, a naiad
7	Hippodamia	Atlanteia or Phoebe, the Hamadryads	Istrus	Arabian woman	32	Glaucippe	Polyxo, a naiad	Potamon	Caliadne, a naiad
8	Rhodia	Atlanteia or Phoebe, the Hamadryads	Chalcodon	Arabian woman	33	Antheleia	Polyxo, a naiad	Cisseus	Caliadne, a naiad
9	Cleopatra	Atlanteia or Phoebe, the Hamadryads	Agenor	Arabian woman	34	Cleodore	Polyxo, a naiad	Lixus	Caliadne, a naiad
10	Asteria	Atlanteia or Phoebe, the Hamadryads	Chaetus	Arabian woman	35	Evippe	Polyxo, a naiad	Imbrus	Caliadne, a naiad
11	Hippodamia	Atlanteia or Phoebe, the Hamadryads	Diocorystes	Arabian woman	36	Erato	Polyxo, a naiad	Bromius	Caliadne, a naiad
12	Glauce	Atlanteia or Phoebe, the Hamadryads	Alces	Arabian woman	37	Stygne	Polyxo, a naiad	Polyctor	Caliadne, a naiad
13	Hippomedusa	Atlanteia or Phoebe, the Hamadryads	Alcmenor	Arabian woman	38	Bryce	Polyxo, a naiad	Chthonius	Caliadne, a naiad
14	Gorge	Atlanteia or Phoebe, the Hamadryads	Hippothous	Arabian woman	39	Actaea	Pieria	Periphas	Gorgo
15	Iphimedusa	Atlanteia or Phoebe, the Hamadryads	Euchenor	Arabian woman	40	Podarce	Pieria	Oeneus	Gorgo
16	Rhode	Atlanteia or Phoebe, the Hamadryads	Hippolytus	Arabian woman	41	Dioxippe	Pieria	Aegyptus	Gorgo
17	Pirene	Ethiopian woman	Agaptolemus	Phoenician woman	42	Adite	Pieria	Menalces	Gorgo
18	Dorion	Ethiopian woman	Cercetes	Phoenician woman	43	Ocypete	Pieria	Lampus	Gorgo
19	Phartis	Ethiopian woman	Eurydamas	Phoenician woman	44	Pylarge	Pieria	Idmon	Gorgo
20	Mnestra	Ethiopian woman	Aegius	Phoenician woman	45	Hippodice	Herse	Idas	Hephaestine
21	Evippe	Ethiopian woman	Argius	Phoenician woman	46	Adiante	Herse	Daiphron	Hephaestine
22	Anaxibia	Ethiopian woman	Archelaus	Phoenician woman	47	Callidice	Crino	Pandion	Hephaestine
23	Nelo	Ethiopian woman	Menemachus	Phoenician woman	48	Oeme	Crino	Arbelus	Hephaestine
24	Clite	Memphis	Clitus	Tyria	49	Celaeno	Crino	Hyperbius	Hephaestine
25	Sthenele	Memphis	Sthenelus	Tyria	50	Hyperippe	Crino	Hippocorystes	Hephaestine

=== Hyginus ===
Hyginus' list is partially corrupt, and some of the names are nearly illegible. Nevertheless, this catalog has almost nothing in common with that of Pseudo-Apollodorus. Names with the (†) symbol mean corrupted entries but annotations from various editors were provided to rationalize their possible names.

Hyginus' list of Danaids
No.	Danaïdes	Aegyptus' sons	Latin Name	No.	Danaïdes	Aegyptus' sons	Latin Name
1	Idea †	Antimachus	Antimachum	26	Autodice	Clytus	Clytum
2	Philomela	Panthius	Panthium	27	Polyxena	Aegyptus	Aegyptum
3	Scylla	Proteus	Proteum	28	Hecabe	Dryas	Dryantem
4	Phicomone †	Plexippus	Plexippum	29	Achamantis †	Echomius †	Echominum
5	Evippe	?		30	Arsalte †	Ephialtes	Ephialtem
6	?	?		31	Monuste †	Eurysthenes †	Eursythenem
7	?	Agenor	Agenorem	32	Amymone	Midamus †	Midamum
8	Demoditas	?		33	Helice	Evideas †	Euideam
9	?	Chrysippus	Chrysippum	34	[Am]Oeme	Poly[de]ctor	Polydectorem
10	Hyale †	Perius	Perium	35	Polybe	Iltonomus †	Iltonomum
11	Trite	Enceladus	Enceladum	36	Helicta †	Cassus	Cassum
12	Damone †	Amyntor	Amyntorem	37	Electra	Hyperantus †	Hyperantum
13	Hippothoe	Obrimus	Obrimum	38	Eubule	Demarchus	Demarchum
14	Myrmidone	Mineus †	Mineum	39	Daplidice †	Pugnon †	Pugnonem
15	Eurydice	Canthus	Canthum	40	Hero	Andromachus	Andromachum
16	Cleo	Asterius	Asterium	41	Europome †	Atlites or Athletes †	Atlitem
17	Arcania †	Xanthus	Xanthum	42	Pyrantis †	Plexippus	Plexippum
18	Cleopatra	Metalces	Metalcem	43	Critomedia	Antipaphus	Antipaphum
19	Philea †	Philinas	Philinam	44	Pirene	Dolichus	Dolichum
20	Hyparete	Protheon	Protheonem	45	Eupheme or Eupheno †	Hyperbius	Hyperbium
21	Chrysothemis	Asterides †	Asteriden	46	Themistagora	Podasimus †	Podasimum
22	Pyrante	Athamas	Athamantem	47	Celaeno	Aristonoos †	Aristonon
23	Armo †	asbus †		48	Itea †	Antiochus	Antiochum
24	Glaucippe	Niavius †	Niavium	49	Erato †	Eudaemon	Eudemonem
25	Demophile	Pamphilus	Pamphilum	50	Hypermestra	Lynceus	Lynceum

=== Ellis ===
A third list was provided by the English antiquarian, Henry Ellis, which was derived from Hyginus. The names of the Danaïdes were complete but with new entries and some alterations in the spellings. It can be observed that the names Armoaste and Danaes (Danais) were an addition to complete the list, while Scea (Scaea) and Autonomes (Automate), which were borrowed from Apollodorus' accounts were also added.

Comparison of Hyginus' and Ellis' list of Danaids
Hyginus		Ellis	Hyginus		Ellis	Hyginus		Ellis	Hyginus		Ellis	Hyginus		Ellis
1	Midea or Idea	Idea	11	Trite	Trite	21	Chrysothemis	Chrysothemis	31	Monuste	Monuste	41	Europome	Europomene
2	Philomela	Philomela	12	Damone	Damone	22	Pyrante	Heranta	32	Amymone	Amimone	42	Pyrantis	Chrysanta
3	Scylla	Scillo	13	Hippothoe	Hippothoe	23	?	Armoaste	33	Helice	Helice	43	Critomedia	Critomedia
4	(Am)Phicomone	Phicomene	14	Myrmidone	Mirmidone	24	Glaucippe	Glaucippe	34	Oeme	Amaome	44	Pirene	Pyrene
5	Evippe	Euippe	15	Eurydice	Euridice	25	Demophile	Demophile	35	Polybe	Polybe	45	Eupheme	Eupheno
6	?	Danaes	16	Cleo	Chleo	26	Autodice	Autodice	36	Helicta	Helicte	46	Themistagora	Themistagora
7	?	Scea	17	Arcadia or Arcania	Vrania	27	Polyxena	Polyxena	37	Electra	Electra	47	Celaeno	Paleno
8	Demoditas	Demoditas	18	Cleopatra	Cleopatra	28	Hecabe	Hecate	38	Eubule	Eubule	48	Itea	Itea
9	?	Autonomes	19	Phila or Philae	Phylea	29	Acamantis	Achamantis	39	Daplidice	Daphildice	49	Erato	Erato
10	Hyale	Hyale	20	Hipparete	Hypareta	30	Arsalte	Arsalte	40	Hero	Hero	50	Hypermnestra	Hypermnestra

== Other Danaïdes ==
Several minor female characters mentioned in various accounts unrelated to the central myth of Danaus and the Danaïdes are also referred to as daughters of Danaus. These include:

- Archedice, along with her sister Helice and two others, chosen by lot by the rest, had founded the temple of Lindian Athene where they made offerings on Lindos in Rhodes.
- Anaxithea, mother of Olenus by Zeus.
- Amphimedusa, mother of Erythras by Poseidon
- Eurythoe, one of the possible mothers of Oenomaus by Ares; alternatively, mother of Hippodamia by Oenomaus
- Hippe, who, like her sister Amymone, gave her name to a freshwater source
- Hippodamia, mother of Olenus by Zeus. (Maybe the same as the above Anaxithea)
- Isonoe or Isione or Hesione, mother of Orchomenus or Chryses by Zeus.
- Kamira
- Phaethusa, one of the possible mothers of Myrtilus by Hermes
- Phylodameia, mother of Pharis by Hermes
- Physadeia, who, like her sister Amymone, gave her name to a freshwater source
- Polydora, nymph-mother of Dryops (Oeta) by the river god Spercheus
- Side, mythical eponym of a town in Laconia

== Sculpture ==
The Danaid name also entered modern sculpture through Constantin Brâncuși's Danaïde, a simplified female head conceived and cast around 1913. The work belongs to Brâncuși's early group of abstracted female heads. In 2026, a bronze cast sold for US$107,585,000 at Christie's in New York, setting a new auction record for Brâncuși and becoming the second-highest price paid for a sculpture at auction.

== Modern literature ==
The Daughters of Danaus is also the title of an 1894 novel by Mona Caird, also dealing with imposed marriage although, in this case, it is a single marriage instead of 50, and in 19th-century Great Britain.

In 1910, the Hungarian poet Mihály Babits published his poem The Danaids, translated into English by Peter Zollman and István Tótfalusi.

Magda Szabó's 1964 novel, A Danaida (The Danaid), is about a woman who lives selfishly for two-thirds of her life without realizing that even she can change the course of history.

Le Châtiment des Danaïdes is an essay by the French-Canadian author Henri-Paul Jacques applying the Freudian concept of psychoanalysis to studying the punishment imposed on the Danaïdes after they committed their crimes.

In Monday Begins on Saturday, it is mentioned that the Danaïdes had their case reviewed in modern times, and, due to mitigating circumstances (the marriage being forced), had their punishment changed to laying and then immediately demolishing asphalt.

Guillaume Apollinaire references the Danaïdes in Le Chanson du mal-aimé.

== See also ==
- Names of the Greeks (Danaans)
- Las Danaides, Alameda Central, Mexico City
