= Proteus (mythology) =

Various mythological figures

In Greek mythology, Proteus (/ˈproʊtiəs, ˈproʊt.juːs/ PROH-tee-əs, PROHT-yooss; Ancient Greek: Πρωτεύς, romanized: Prōteús, lit. 'first') may refer to the following characters.

- Proteus, a minor sea god and son of Poseidon.
- Proteus, an Egyptian king in a version of the story of Helen of Troy.
- Proteus, an Egyptian prince as one of the sons of King Aegyptus. He suffered the same fate as his other brothers, save Lynceus, when they were slain on their wedding night by their wives who obeyed the command of their father King Danaus of Libya. Proteus' mother was Argyphia, a woman of royal blood and thus full brother of Lynceus, Busiris, Enceladus, Lycus and Daiphron. In some accounts, he could be a son of Aegyptus either by Eurryroe, daughter of the river-god Nilus, or Isaie, daughter of King Agenor of Tyre. Proteus either married the Danaid Scylla or Gorgophone, daughter of Danaus and Elephantis.
- Proteus, son of Oresbius and Panacea. He was Trojan soldier who was killed by Odysseus during the siege of Troy.
