= Cleitus (mythology) =

Several figures in Greek mythology

In Greek mythology, Cleitus or Clitus (/ˈklaɪtəs/; Ancient Greek: Κλεῖτος or Κλειτός, romanized: Kleitos, lit. 'renowned' or 'famous') may refer to:

- Cleitus, also Clytus, an Egyptian prince as one of the 50 sons of King Aegyptus. His mother was a Tyria and thus full brother of Sthenelus and Chrysippus. In some accounts, he could be a son of Aegyptus either by Eurryroe, daughter of the river-god Nilus, or Isaie, daughter of King Agenor of Tyre. Clitus suffered the same fate as his other brothers, save Lynceus, when they were slain on their wedding night by their wives who obeyed the command of their father King Danaus of Libya. He married the Danaid named Clite, daughter of Danaus and Memphis, or Autodice.
- Cleitus, son of Mantius, who was abducted by Eos because of his beauty. After his death, he was placed among other immortals. He was the father of Coeranus and grandfather of Polyeidos.
- Cleitus, son of Polyeidos, thus great-grandson of the precedent. He and his brother Euchenor fought in the war of the Epigoni and later the Trojan War.
- Cleitus, suitor of Pallene, daughter of Sithon of Thrace. He eventually won Pallene's hand and inherited Sithon's kingdom.
- Cleitus, a Sithonian king whose daughter Chrysonoe or Torone married Proteus.
- Cleitus, a minstrel at the court of Priamus.
- Cleitus, a Trojan, son of Peisenor, friend of Polydamas, killed by Teucer.
- Cleitus, another Trojan, son of Agamestor and a nymph, killed by Podalirius.
