= Aegyptus (mythology) =

Set of mythological Greek characters

In Greek mythology, Aegyptus or Ægyptus (/ɪˈdʒɪptəs/; Ancient Greek: Αἴγυπτος, romanized: Aíguptos) may refer to the following related characters:

- Aegyptus, son of Zeus and Thebe and thus, can be considered brother of the earlier Heracles. Aegyptus was the father of Carcho from whom the island of Carthage was named after. This Aegyptus may be the same or different with the one below.
- Aegyptus, king of Egypt and son of King Belus and the naiad Achiroe.
- Aegyptus, an Egyptian prince as one of the sons of above King Aegyptus. His mother was Gorgo and thus full brother of Periphas, Oeneus, Menalces, Lampus and Idmon. In some accounts, he could be a son of Aegyptus either by Eurryroe, daughter of the river-god Nilus, or Isaie, daughter of King Agenor of Tyre. Aegyptus suffered the same fate as his other brothers, save Lynceus, when they were slain on their wedding night by their wives who obeyed the command of their father King Danaus of Libya. He married the Danaid Dioxippe, daughter of Danaus and Pieria, or the other Danaid Polyxena.
- Aegyptius, also transliterated as Aegyptus, the elderly Ithacan hero and father of Euronymus and Antiphus.
