= Oeneus (mythology) =

In Greek mythology, Oeneus (/ˈiː.niː.əs/; Ancient Greek: Οἰνεύς, romanized: Oineús, lit. 'wine-man' or 'winemaker') may refer to the following characters:

- Oeneus, an Egyptian prince as one of the sons of King Aegyptus. His mother was Gorgo and thus full brother of Periphas, Aegyptus, Menalces, Lampus and Idmon. In some accounts, his mother could either be Eurryroe, daughter of the river-god Nilus, or Isaia, daughter of King Agenor of Tyre. Oeneus suffered the same fate as his other brothers, saved Lynceus, when they were slain on their wedding night by their wives who obeyed the command of their father King Danaus of Libya. He married the Danaid Podarce, daughter of Danaus and Pieria.
- Oeneus, father of Perimede, mother of Astypalaea and Europe by Phoenix, son of Agenor.
- Oeneus, a bastard son of King Pandion of Athens. He was one of the heroes eponymoi at Athens who gave his name to the tribe of Oineis.
- Oeneus, king of Calydon and father of Meleager by Althaea.
- Oeneus, one of the captains who supported Dionysus in his conflict against Poseidon concerning Beroe. He was son of Ereuthalion.
- Oeneus, father of the naiad Oenone, first wife of Paris prior her abandonment on the account of Helen of Sparta.
