= Daiphron =

In Greek mythology, Daiphron (Ancient Greek: Δαΐφρων means "warlike" or "prudent") may refer to the following Egyptian brother-princes:

- Daiphron, one of the sons of King Aegyptus of Egypt. He suffered the same fate as his other brothers, save Lynceus, when they were slain on their wedding night by their wives who obeyed the command of their father King Danaus of Libya. Daiphron was the son of Aegyptus by Argyphia, a woman of royal blood and thus full brother of Lynceus, Proteus, Busiris, Lycus and Enceladus. He married the Danaid Scaea, daughter of Danaus and Europe.
- Daiphron, one of the youngest sons of Aegyptus and thus, brother of the above-mentioned character. His mother was called Hephaestine and brother to Idas, Pandion, Arbelus, Hyperbius, Hippocorystes. Daiphron married the Danaid Adiante who also killed him during their wedding night following the command of her father, King Danaus of Libya

In some accounts, these two sons of Aegyptus could be begotten by either Eurryroe, daughter of the river-god Nilus, or Isaie, daughter of King Agenor of Tyre.
