= Chrysippus (mythology) =

Various mythological characters

In Greek mythology, Chrysippus (/kraɪˈsɪpəs, krɪ-/; Ancient Greek: Χρύσιππος, romanized: Khrúsippos, lit. 'golden horse') may refer to the following individuals:

- Chrysippus, an Egyptian prince as one of the 50 sons of King Aegyptus. His mother was a Tyria and thus full brother of Clitus and Sthenelus. In some accounts, he could be a son of Aegyptus either by Eurryroe, daughter of the river-god Nilus, or Isaie, daughter of King Agenor of Tyre. Clitus suffered the same fate as his other brothers, save Lynceus, when they were slain on their wedding night by their wives who obeyed the command of their father King Danaus of Libya. He married the Danaid Chrysippe, daughter of Danaus and Memphis.
- Chrysippus of Elis, illegitimate son of Pelops abducted and raped by Laius.
- Chrysippus, a son of Aeolus.
- Chrysippus, eponymous founder of Chrysippa in Cilicia.
- Chrysippus, a warrior known only from a vase painting by the Brygos Painter, in which the Oceanid Zeuxo serves him wine.
