= Sthenelus =

Name attributed to several different individuals in Greek mythology

In Greek mythology, Sthenelus (/ˈsθɛnələs, ˈstɛn-/; Ancient Greek: Σθένελος Sthénelos, "strong one" or "forcer", derived from sthenos "strength, might, force") was a name attributed to several different individuals:

- Sthenelus, son of Perseus and Andromeda. He was the father of Eurystheus.
- Sthenelus, son of Capaneus and Evadne. He fought alongside Diomedes in the Iliad.
- Sthenelus, father of Cycnus and King of Liguria.
- Sthenelus or Sthenelās, king of Argos and son of Crotopus, son of Agenor, son of Triopas. He was the father of Gelanor.
- Sthenelus, an Egyptian prince as one of the 50 sons of King Aegyptus. His mother was a Tyria and thus full brother of Clitus and Chrysippus. In some accounts, he could be a son of Aegyptus either by Eurryroe, daughter of the river-god Nilus, or Isaie, daughter of King Agenor of Tyre. Clitus suffered the same fate as his other brothers, save Lynceus, when they were slain on their wedding night by their wives who obeyed the command of their father King Danaus of Libya. He married the Danaid Sthenele, daughter of Danaus and Memphis.
- Sthenelus, son of Actor and a companion of Heracles, whom he accompanied to the land of the Amazons to take Hippolyte's girdle. Ammianus Marcellinus wrote that Sthenelus was killed during the war with the Amazons.
- Sthenelus, son of Androgeos, and grandson of Minos. During Heracles' journey to retrieve the belt of Hippolyte, while at the city of Paros two of his companions are murdered by sons of Minos, enraging the hero. He kills the sons of Minos responsible for the act, and only ceases the destruction when he is offered to take two hostages, with him choosing Sthenelus, along with his brother Alcaeus.

Regnal titles
Preceded by Crotopus	King of Argos	Succeeded by Gelanor
