= Enceladus (son of Aegyptus) =

Egyptian prince in Greek mythology

In Greek mythology, Enceladus (Ancient Greek: Ἐγκέλαδος Enkélados) was an Egyptian prince as one of the sons of King Aegyptus.

== Family ==
Enceladus's mother was Argyphia, a woman of royal blood and thus full brother of Lynceus, Proteus, Busiris, Lycus and Daiphron. In some accounts, he could be a son of Aegyptus either by Eurryroe, daughter of the river-god Nilus, or Isaie, daughter of King Agenor of Tyre.

== Mythology ==
Enceladus suffered the same fate as his other brothers, save Lynceus, when they were slain on their wedding night by their wives who obeyed the command of their father King Danaus of Libya. He either married the Danaid Trite or Amymone, daughter of Danaus and Europe.
