= Busiris (mythology) =

Set of Greek mythological characters

In Greek mythology, Busiris (Ancient Greek: Βούσιρις) was the name shared by two figures:

- Busiris, an Egyptian prince as one of the sons of King Aegyptus. He suffered the same fate as his other brothers, save Lynceus, when they were slain on their wedding night by their wives who obeyed the command of their father King Danaus of Libya. Busiris was the son of Aegyptus by Argyphia, a woman of royal blood and thus full brother of Lynceus, Proteus, Enceladus, Lycus and Daiphron. In some accounts, he could be a son of Aegyptus either by Eurryroe, daughter of the river-god Nilus, or Isaie, daughter of King Agenor of Tyre. Busiris married the Danaid Automate, daughter of Danaus and Europe.
- Busiris, a king of Egypt, who used to sacrifice strangers and was killed by Heracles.
