= Herse =

Characters in Greek mythology

In Greek mythology, Herse (Ancient Greek: Ἕρση, romanized: Hérsē, lit. 'dew') may refer to the following figures:

- Herse, daughter of Selene by Zeus, see Ersa.
- Herse, daughter of Cecrops.
- Herse, one of the many consorts of King Danaus of Libya and mother of his daughters Hippodice and Adiante. These daughters wed and slew their cousin-husbands, sons of King Aegyptus of Egypt and Hephaestine during their wedding night. According to Hippostratus, Danaus had all of his progeny by a single woman, Europe, daughter of the river-god Nilus. In some accounts, he married his cousin Melia, daughter of Agenor, king of Tyre.
- Herse, the mother of Cephalus, whom Eos carried off, by Hermes.
