= Lycus (mythology) =

Various Greek mythological figures

Lycus (/ˈlaɪkəs/ LY-kəs; Ancient Greek: Λύκος, romanized: Lúkos, lit. 'wolf') is the name of multiple people in Greek mythology:

- Lycus, one of the Telchines who fought under Dionysus in his Indian campaign. He is otherwise said to have erected a temple to Apollo Lycius on the banks of Xanthus river.
- Lycus, son of Prometheus and Celaeno, brother of Chimaerus. The brothers are said to have had tombs in the Troad; they are otherwise unknown.
- Lycus of Athens, a wolf-shaped herο, whose shrine stood by the jurycourt, and the first jurors were named after him.
- Lycus, an Egyptian prince as one of the sons of King Aegyptus. He suffered the same fate as his other brothers, save Lynceus of Argos, when they were slain on their wedding night by their wives who obeyed the command of their father King Danaus of Libya. Lycus was the son of Aegyptus by Argyphia, a woman of royal blood and thus full brother of Lynceus, Proteus, Enceladus, Busiris and Daiphron. In some accounts, he could be a son of Aegyptus either by Eurryroe, daughter of the river-god Nilus, or Isaie, daughter of King Agenor of Tyre. Lycus married the Danaid Agave, daughter of Danaus and Europe.
- Lycus, son of Poseidon and Celaeno.
- Lycus, the "loudvoiced" satyr herald of Dionysus during the Indian War. In secret union, Hermes fathered him, Pherespondus and Pronomus, by Iphthime, daughter of Dorus. Eiraphiotes (i.e. Dionysus) entrusted to these three satyr brothers the dignity of 'the staff of their wisdom-fostering father, the herald of heaven'.
- Lycus, son of Arrhetus and Laobie, who, together with his father and brothers, fought under Deriades against Dionysus.
- Lycus, son of Pandion II and brother of King Aegeus of Athens.
- Lycus, son of Hyrieus and Clonia, and brother of Nycteus. He became the guardian of Labdacus and Laius. Nycteus, unable to retrieve his daughter Antiope from Epopeus of Sicyon, sent his brother Lycus to take her. He invaded Sicyon, killed Epopeus and gave Antiope as a slave to his own wife, Dirce.
- Lycus, a descendant of the above Lycus, said to have usurped the power over Thebes.
- Lycus, son of Dascylus of Mysia or Mariandyne. He was hospitable towards the Argonauts and Heracles, who conquered the land of the Bebryces (Heraclea Pontica). He is apparently identical with the Lycus given as a son of Titias, brother of Priolaus and eponym of a city.
- Lycus, same as Lycurgus (of Nemea).
- Lycus, the mortal lover of Coronis, mother of Asclepius. He is otherwise commonly known as Ischys, son of Elatus.
- Lycus, a Thracian killed by Cycnus in single combat.
- Lycus, a centaur at the wedding of Pirithous and Hippodamia, was killed by Pirithous.
- Lycus, a defender of Thebes in the war of the Seven against Thebes.
- Lycus and Pernis are listed by Hyginus as parents of Ascalaphus and Ialmenus, who are otherwise known as sons of Ares and Astyoche.
- Lycus, son of Ares and a Libyan king.
- Lycus, a Cretan prince as the son of King Idomeneus and Meda, probably the brother of Orsilochus, Cleisithyra and Iphiclus. Together with the latter, they were slain by the usurper Leucus.
- Lycus, one of the companions of Diomedes that were changed into birds in Italy
- Lycus, a lost companion of Aeneas
- Lycus, another companion of Aeneas, killed by Turnus.
- Lycus and Termerus were two notorious brigands in Caria.
