= Andromachus (mythology) =

In Greek mythology, Andromachus (Ancient Greek: Ἀνδρόμαχον, lit. 'fighting with men') may refer to the following characters:

- Andromachus, an Egyptian prince and one of the sons of Aegyptus. He married the Danaid Hero and suffered the same fate along with his brothers, except Lynceus, when their brides treacherously killed them during their wedding night.
- Andromachus, a Cretan warrior who was killed by Aeneas during the Trojan War. He was from Knossos.
