= Physadeia =

Name in Greek mythology

Physadeia (Ancient Greek: Φυσάδεια) is a name in Greek mythology that may refer to:

- Physadeia, a Libyan princess as one of the Danaids, daughters of King Danaus, who, like her sister Amymone, gave her name to a freshwater source (The well of Physadeia near Argos).
- Physadeia, sister of Pirithous. When the Dioscuri had taken Helen back to Sparta, they had taken captive Physadeia and Aethra, Theseus' mother. These women became handmaidens of Helen and later followed her to Troy.
