= Eurydice (mythology) =

Set of Greek mythological characters

In Greek mythology, Eurydice (/jʊəˈrɪdɪsi/; Ancient Greek: Εὐρυδίκη, romanized: Eurydíkē, lit. 'wide justice', derived from εὐρύς, eurýs, 'wide' and δίκη, díkē, 'justice'), may refer to the following characters:

- Eurydice, one of the 50 Nereids, sea-nymph daughters of the 'Old Man of the Sea' Nereus and the Oceanid Doris.
- Eurydice, wife of King Aeolus of Aeolia and mother of his sons, Sisyphus, Salmoneus and Cretheus. She may be identical to Enarete, the daughter of Deïmachus, who was commonly called the mother of these progeny.
- Eurydice, a Libyan princess as one of the 50 Danaïdes, daughter of King Danaus and the naiad Polyxo, who married (and murdered) Dryas.
- Eurydice, one of the Cadmiades, the six daughters of Cadmus and Harmonia in a rare version of the myth. Her sisters were Ino, Agaue, Semele, Kleantho and Eurynome.
- Eurydice, a Spartan princess as the daughter of King Lacedaemon. She was the mother of Danae by her husband King Acrisius of Argos.
- Eurydice, daughter of Adrastus, wife of Ilus, and mother of King Laomedon.
- Eurydice, wife of Neleus, mother of Thrasymedes.
- Eurydice, an Elean princess as the daughter of King Pelops of Pisa. She was the wife of Electryon, and grandmother of Heracles.
- Eurydice, wife of Orpheus who attempted to bring her back from the Underworld.
- Eurydice, wife of King Creon of Thebes and mother of Haemon, Menoeceus and Megara.
- Eurydice, eldest daughter of Clymenus and wife of Nestor.
- Eurydice, an Argive princess as the daughter of King Amphiaraus and Eriphyle, and thus, sister to Alcmaeon, Amphilochus, Demonassa, Alcmena and Alexida.
- Eurydice, wife of King Lycurgus (of Nemea) and mother of Opheltes.
- Eurydice, wife of Aeneas, according to Lescheos and writer of the epic poem Cypria.
