= Polyxo =

Several figures in Greek mythology

Polyxo (/pəˈlɪksoʊ/; Ancient Greek: Πολυξώ, romanized: Poluxṓ or Polyxô) is the name of several figures in Greek mythology:

- Polyxo, one of the 3,000 Oceanids, water-nymph daughters of the Titans Oceanus and his sister-wife Tethys.
- Polyxo, one of the Hyades.
- Polyxo, a Naiad of the river Nile, presumably one of the daughters of the river-god Nilus. She was one of the wives of King Danaus of Libya and bore him twelve daughters: Autonoe, Theano, Electra, Cleopatra, Eurydice, Glaucippe, Anthelea, Cleodora, Euippe, Erato, Stygne, and Bryce. They married twelve sons of King Aegyptus of Egypt and Caliadne, Polyxo's sister, and murdered them on their wedding night. According to Hippostratus, Danaus had all of his progeny by a single woman, Europe, also daughter of Nilus. In some accounts, he married Melia, daughter of his uncle Agenor, king of Tyre.
- Polyxo, mother of Antiope and possibly Nycteis by Nycteus.
- Polyxo, mother of Actorion. She came to invite Triopas and Erysichthon to her son's wedding, but Erysichthon's mother had to answer that her own son was not coming, as he had been wounded by a boar during hunt. The truth was that Erysichthon was dealing with the insatiable hunger sent upon him by the angry Demeter.
- Polyxo, a Lemnian, nurse of Hypsipyle and a seeress. She advised that the Lemnian women conceive children with the Argonauts, as all the men on the island had previously been killed.
- Polyxo, a native of Argos, who married Tlepolemus. She received Helen after the latter had been driven out of Sparta, but when Helen was bathing, several handmaidens sent by Polyxo, seized her and hanged her from a tree.
- Polyxo, a Maenad in the retinue of Dionysus who attempted to kill Lycurgus of Thrace.
- Polyxo (or Polyzo), a sister of Meleager.
