= Scylla (mythology) =

Several women in Greek mythology

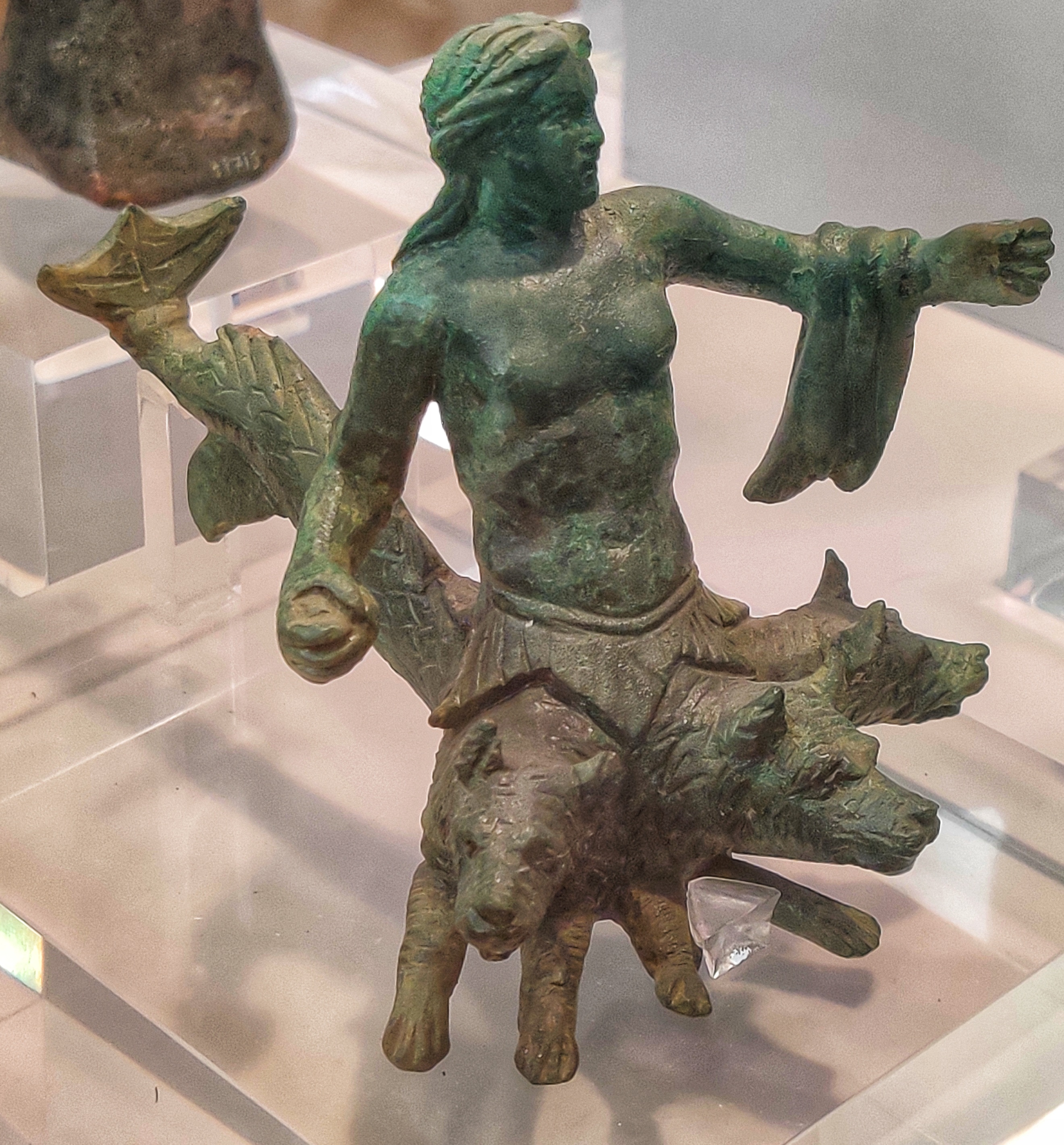
Bronze Scylla figurine, late 4th century BC, in the National Archaeological Museum of Athens.

In Greek and Roman mythology, Scylla (/ˈsɪlə/, SIL-ə; Ancient Greek: Σκύλλα, romanized: Skúlla) can refer to the following women:

- Scylla, a legendary man-eating beast who devoured six of Odysseus' men while they sailed past her during their journey back home.
- Scylla, a princess of Megara and daughter of Nisus who sabotaged her own father and betrayed her city out of love for Minos, the besieger of Megara, or because of a bribe of gold.
- Scylla, one of the Danaids, the fifty daughters of Danaus. She married and killed her cousin Proteus, the son of Aegyptus, on her father's orders.

== Bibliography ==
- Aeschylus, The Libation Bearers in Aeschylus, with an English translation by Herbert Weir Smyth, Ph. D. in two volumes. 2. Libation Bearers. Herbert Weir Smyth, Ph. D. Cambridge, MA. Harvard University Press. 1926. Available online on Perseus Digital Library.
- Homer; The Odyssey with an English Translation by A.T. Murray, PH.D. in two volumes. Cambridge, MA., Harvard University Press; London, William Heinemann, Ltd. 1919. Online version at the Perseus Digital Library.
- Gaius Julius Hyginus, The Myths of Hyginus translated and edited by Mary Grant. University of Kansas Publications in Humanistic Studies. Online version at the Topos Text Project.
- Ovid (2000). Metamorphoses. Translated by Anthony S. Kline. Borders Classics. ISBN 9781587261565.
