= Scaea =

In Greek mythology, Scaea (Ancient Greek: Σκαιά, romanized: Skaia, lit. 'left' or 'on the left hand') was one of the 50 Danaids.

== Family ==
Scaea was the daughter of Danaus, king of Libya (and later Argos) and Europe, a queen. She was the full sister of other Danaids namely Automate, Amymone and Agave. Scaea was married to Daiphron, son of Aegyptus and later to Archander of whom she had begotten a son, Metanastes.

== Mythology ==
Scaea like her other sisters, except Hypermnestra, killed their husbands on their wedding night at the behest of their father Danaus. Later on, because of the murder, Scaea and her sisters were punished in afterlife, being forced to carry a jug to fill a bathtub (pithos) without a bottom to wash their sins off. The water was always leaking that they would forever try to fill the tub.

In some accounts, Scaea remarried Archander while her sister Automate took as husband his brother Architeles. These two were sons of Achaeus, coming from Phthiotis to settle in Argos.
