= Eurysthenes (disambiguation) =

Eurysthenes may refer to:

- Eurysthenes, a Heraclid, one of the two first kings of Sparta, father of the founder of the Agiad line
- Eurysthenes, one of the sons of Aegyptus killed by his wife, one of the Danaïdes
- Eurysthenes (Pergamon), a descendant of the deposed Spartan king, Demaratus
- Adhemarius eurysthenes, a species of moth
