= Amymone =

Danaid in Greek mythology

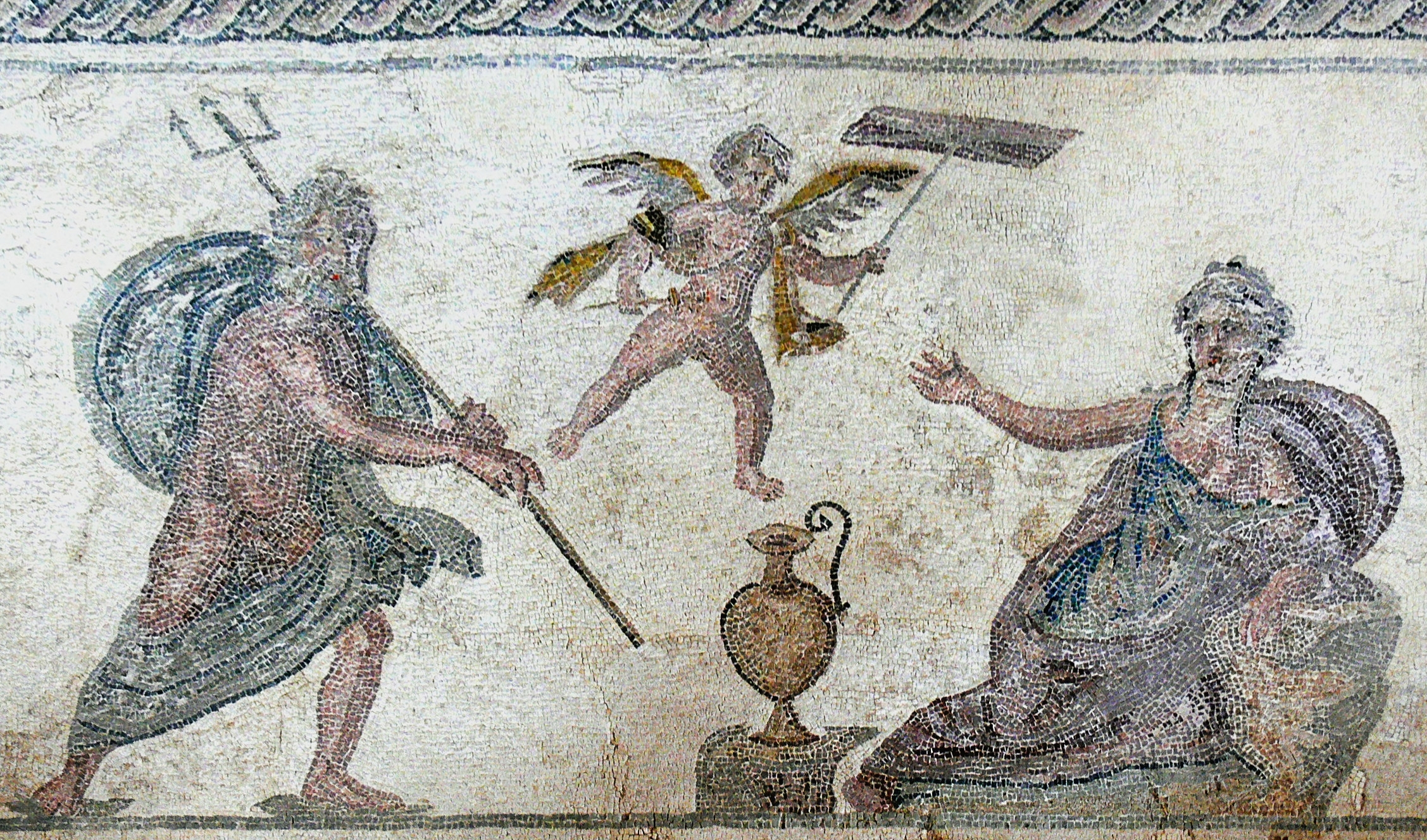
Poseidon approaches Amymone, whose identity is symbolized by the water jug. Cupid above represents the erotic motive of the scene (Roman-era mosaic, House of Dionysos at Nea Paphos in Cyprus.)

In Greek mythology, Amymone (/æmɪˈmoʊniː/; Ancient Greek: Ἀμυμώνη, romanized: Amymóne, lit. 'blameless' or 'innocent') was one of the 50 Danaids as a daughter of Danaus, king of Libya. As the "blameless" Danaid, her name identifies her as, perhaps, identical to Hypermnestra ("great wooing" or "high marriage"): the one Danaid who did not assassinate her husband on their wedding night.

== Family ==
Apollodorus names Amymone as one of the four daughters of Danaus and his consort Europa, the queen of an unnamed country. Amymone's only full sisters are Automate, Agave, and Scaea. She was either the wife of Enceladus or Lynceus, both one of the 50 sons of the Egyptian king Aegyptus.

== Mythology ==
=== Encounter with Poseidon ===
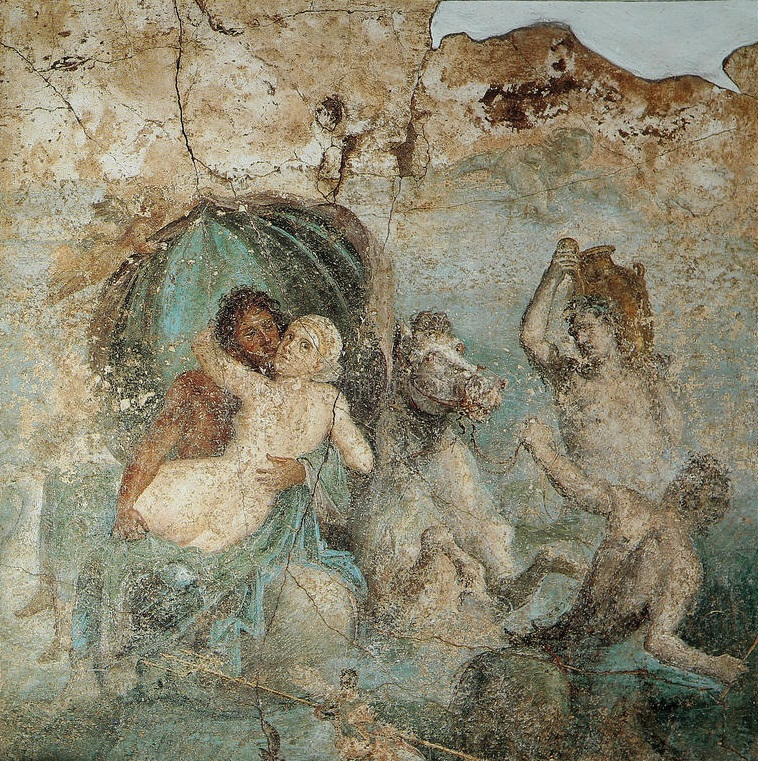
Neptune and Amymone, fresco in Stabiae, Italy, 1st century

Amymone is the subject of multiple, sometimes conflicting myths. She is most well-known for her involvement with Poseidon. In one common telling, Poseidon dried up all the springs around Argos due to Inachus, the first king of Argos, making a sacrifice to Hera and claiming the lands belonged to her instead of Poseidon, whose cult preceded hers in the region. One day, Amymone was sent out to fetch water. On her trip, she spotted a stag and shot an arrow at it. However, she missed and accidentally struck a satyr who began to pursue her. Seeing this, Poseidon intervened and took her for himself; afterwards the god revealed the springs of Lerna to her, a cult site of great antiquity near the shores of the Argolid.

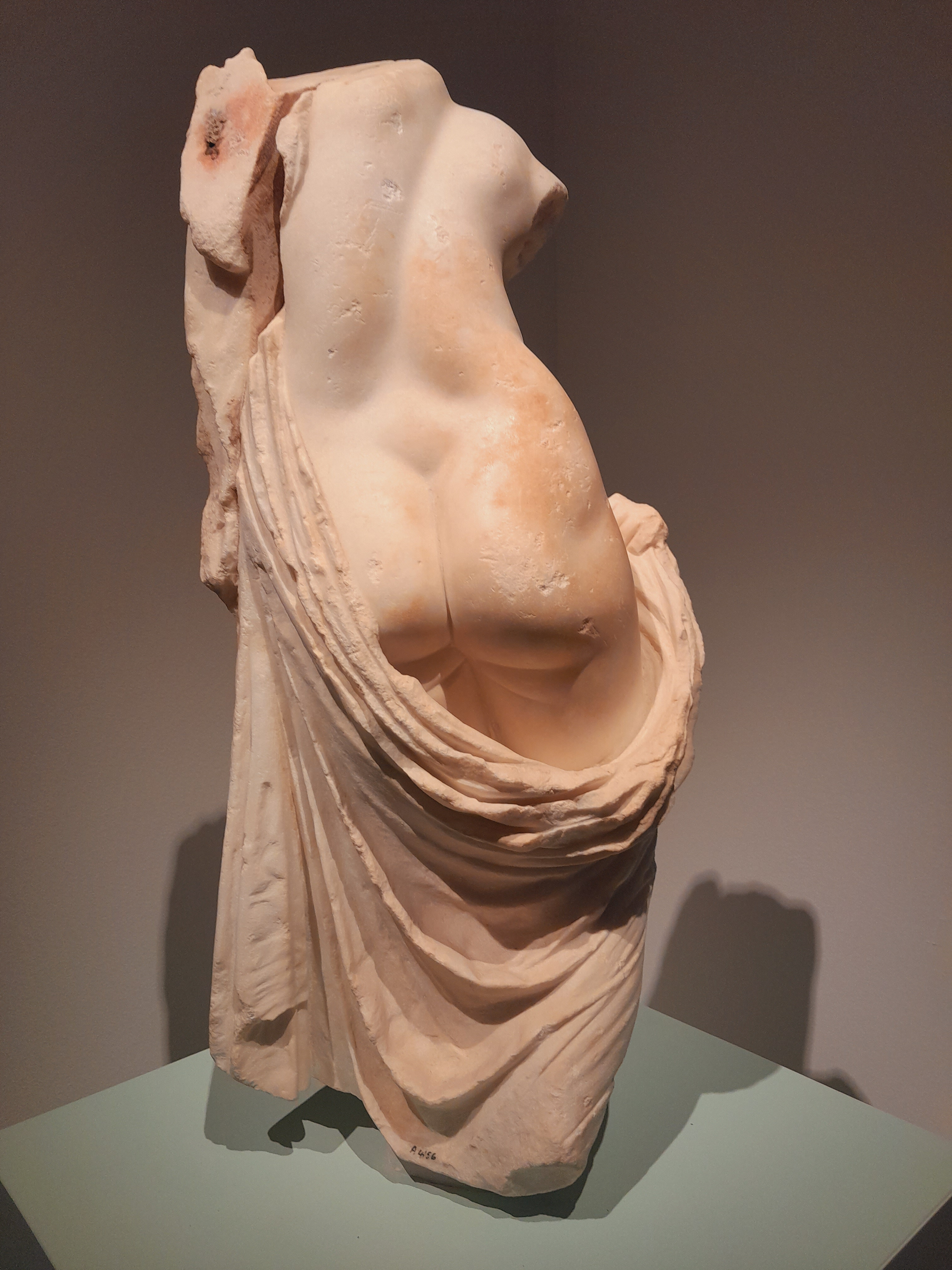
Marble torso of Amymone from a larger group that would have included Poseidon. 2nd-century BC, Archaeological Museum of Delos, Greece.

In another version of the myth, Amymone fell asleep when she was out to fetch water and was attacked by a satyr. Poseidon then intervened and scared the satyr away by throwing his trident, and lodged it in a rock. Poseidon questioned why she was there, and after hearing the reason— to fetch water— he had Amymone remove his trident from the rock, where a spring then gushed forth. This fountain, river, or spring created by and named after Amymone is mentioned by multiple ancient authors including Pliny, Ovid, and Apollodorus. They claim the spring is near to the lake of Lerna where the hydra lived. However, authors such as Pausanias claim that the hydra instead lived in the river Amymone.

After Poseidon saved her, he had sex with her. She gave birth to Naupilus, a renowned seafarer and navigator who gave his name to the port city of Nafplio (Nauplia).

Aeschylus wrote a now lost satyr play called Amymone about the seduction of Amymone by Poseidon, which followed the trilogy that included The Suppliants.

=== As a Danaid ===
According to Apollodorus, she is the wife of Prince Enceladus, whom she slew on their wedding night. This would have made her one of the 49 Danaids who killed their husbands, with only Hypermnestra refusing. However, she has also been named as the innocent Danaid who refused to kill her husband, therefore either making Amymone and Hypermnestra the same figure, or replacing Hypermnestra. In this version of the myth, her husband would have been Lynceus and she would have given birth to Abas, the first of the Danaid Dynasty that led to Perseus, the legendary founder of Mycenae.

Amymone is represented by a water pitcher, a reminder of the sacred springs and lake of Lerna and of the copious wells that made Argos the "well-watered" and, by contrast, a reminder that her sisters were forever punished in Tartarus for their murderous crimes by being forever forced to carry a jug to fill a bathtub (pithos) without a bottom (or with a leak) to wash away their sins.

== Daughter of Inachus ==
A naiad daughter of Inachus, sister of Messeis, Io and Hyperia, shares her name. The two Amymone might have been conflated at a time.
