= Polydector =

In Greek mythology, Polydector (Ancient Greek: Πολυδέκτωρ, romanized: Polydektor, lit. 'receiver of many', 'much-receiving' or 'welcoming many') may refer to the following characters:

- Polydector, an Egyptian prince and one of the sons of Aegyptus. He married the Danaid Oeme and suffered the same fate along with his brothers, except Lynceus, when their brides treacherously killed them during their wedding night.
- Polydector or Polydectus, son of Phineus and Cleopatra, and brother of Polydorus. These two sons by his first wife were blinded by Phineus because of the instigation of their stepmother, Idaea who accused them of corrupting her virtue.
