= Philomela (mythology) =

In Greek mythology, Philomele (Ancient Greek: Φιλομήλη, romanized: Philomḗlē) or Philomela (/ˌfɪləˈmiːlə/; Ancient Greek: Φιλομήλα, romanized: Philomḗla, lit. 'lover of song' or 'lover of melody') may refer to the following women:

- Philomela, the Athenian daughter of King Pandion of Athens and Zeuxippe. She got her tongue cut out by Tereus who also raped her and, by weaving characters in a robe, revealed her own sorrows to her sister Procne, wife of Tereus. Philomela was turned into a swallow or into a nightingale.
- Philomela, daughter of King Danaus of Argos as one of the 50 Danaids. She married her paternal cousin Panthius, son of Aegyptus, and eventually killed him on their wedding night following the instructions of her father.
- Philomela, daughter of Actor and the wife of Peleus, by whom she is said to have been the mother of Achilles.
- Philomela, wife of Menoetius and mother of Patroclus.
- Philomela, appeared on the list of children of King Priam of Troy.
- Philomela, one of the Maenads, female followers of Dionysus.
