= Las Danaides =

Fountain and sculpture in Mexico City, Mexico

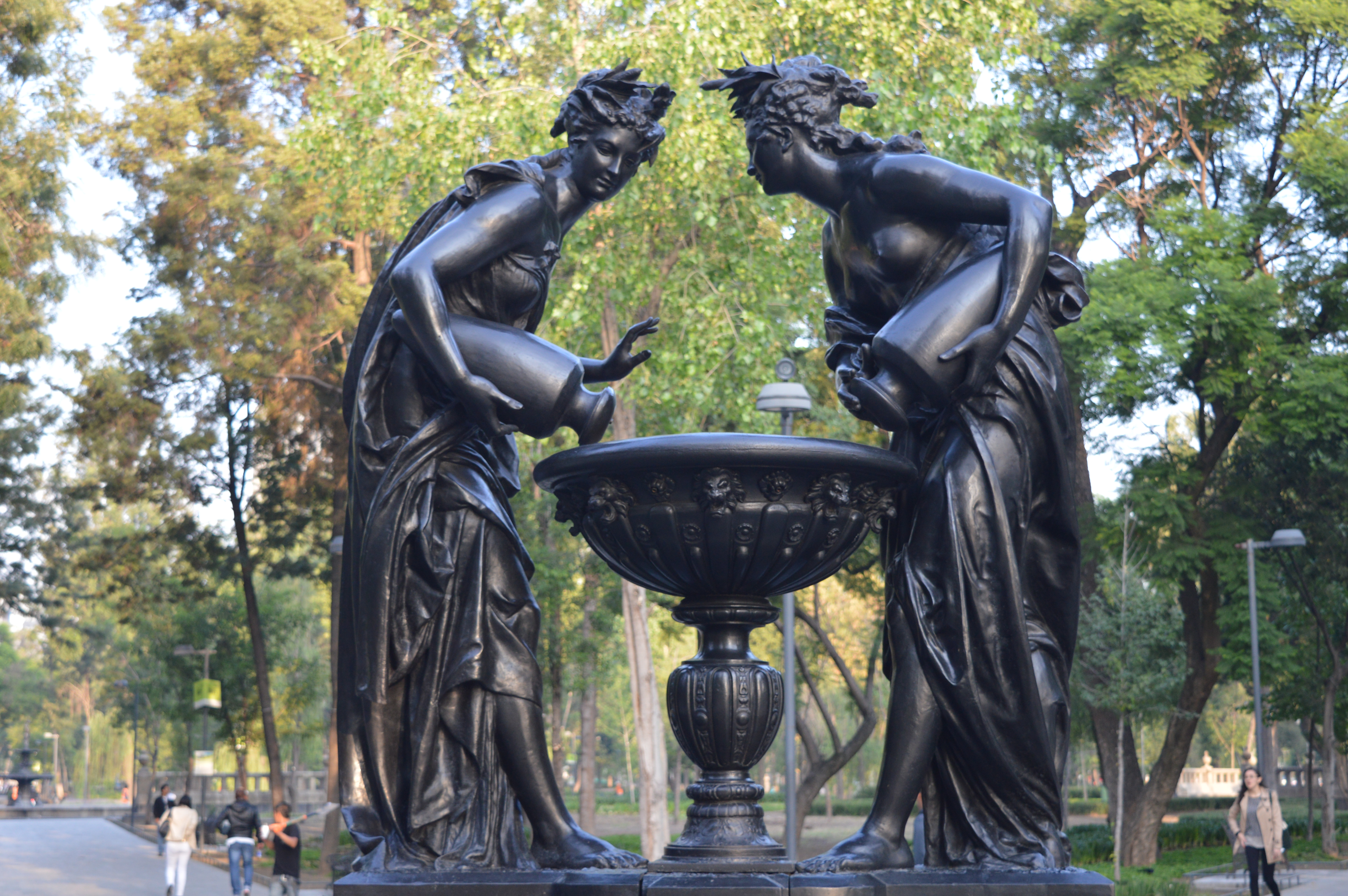
- The fountain's statues in 2015
- Location: Mexico City, Mexico
- 19°26′9.3″N 99°8′34.6″W

Las Danaides is a fountain and sculpture in Mexico City's Alameda Central, in Mexico. The statue depicts two women representing the 50 daughters of Danaus (Danaïdes).
