= Gorgo (mythology) =

Women in Greek mythology

In Greek mythology, Gorgo (Ancient Greek: Γοργώ, romanized: Gorgṓ, lit. 'grim', 'fierce', 'terrible' or 'dreadful') can refer to the following individuals:

- Gorgo, one of the multiple women of Aegyptus, king of Egypt. By the latter, she became the mother of six princes: Periphas, Oeneus, Aegyptus, Menalces, Lampus and Idmon. Her sons were wed and slayed by their cousin-wives, daughters of King Danaus of Libya and Pieria during their wedding night. According to Hippostratus, Aegyptus had his progeny by a single woman called Eurryroe, daughter of the river-god Nilus. In some accounts, he consorted with his cousin Isaia, daughter of Agenor, king of Tyre.
- Gorgo, a Cretan woman, wooed by many men, among them her kinsman Asander, who had lost all his wealth. During his funeral she looked out of the window to get a glimpse, and was turned into stone, paralleling the Cypriot myths of Arsinoe and Anaxarete.
- Gorgo, listed as one of Actaeon's dogs who mangled him after being transformed into a stag by Artemis.
