= Sthenele =

Two figures in Greek mythology

In Greek mythology, the name Sthenele (Ancient Greek: Σθενέλη) may refer to:

- Sthenele, daughter of Danaus and Memphis, who married (and killed) Sthenelus, son of Aegyptus and Tyria.
- Sthenele, daughter of Acastus, King of Iolcus. She was the mother of Patroclus by Menoetius of Opus. Other possible mothers of Patroclus are Polymele, Periopis, and Philomela.
