= Stygne =

Figure in Greek mythology

In Greek mythology, Stygne (Ancient Greek: Στύγνη, lit. 'hated' or 'abhorred') was one of the Danaïdes, daughter of King Danaus of Libya (and later Argos) and Polyxo. Following the orders of her father, she married (and eventually murdered) her cousin–husband Polyctor, son of Aegyptus and Caliadne.
