= Elasioi =

According to Plutarch, in Greek mythology, the Elasioi (Ancient Greek: Ἐλάσιοι, meaning 'Averters' or 'Expellers'; in Latin, 'Elasii') were thought in Argos to be the descendants of Alexida, daughter of Amphiaraus, with the power to avert epileptic attacks.

Theodor Panofka and Leonard Schmitz call them 'divinities'. Temkin Owsei describes them as healers 'probably of a magic type', whilst Eduard Thraemer calls them Heilheroen ('healing heroes'). Outside of the brief reference in Plutarch, they are not mentioned in surviving sources.
