= Cleite =

Several figures in Greek mythology

In Greek mythology, the name Clite or Cleite (Ancient Greek: Κλείτη, lit. 'renowned, famous') may refer to:

- Clite, daughter of Danaus and Memphis, married and killed Cleitus, son of Aegyptus and Tyria.
- Clite, a maenad who followed Dionysus on his Indian campaign.
- Clite, daughter of Merops of Percote and wife of Cyzicus. When her husband was unwittingly killed by the Argonauts, she hanged herself in grief. A spring was named Cleite after her or she turned into one.
- Clite, mother of Meilanion by Erylaus. Her son was among the defenders of Troy and was killed by Antiphus.
