= Iphimedusa =

In Greek mythology, Iphimedusa or Iphimedousa (Ancient Greek: Ἰφιμέδουσα, lit. 'strong ruler' or 'mighty protectress') one of the 50 Danaids as a daughter of King Danaus of Libya (and later Argos) either by the hamadryads Atlantia or Phoebe. She married and eventually murdered her cousin Euchenor, son of the Egyptian king Aegyptus by an Arabian woman, following the orders of her father Danaus.

Because of the murder, later on, Iphimedusa and her sisters were punished in afterlife, being forced to carry a jug to fill a bathtub (pithos) without a bottom (or with a leak) to wash their sins off. The water was always leaking that they would forever try to fill the tub.
