= Gorgophone =

Characters in Greek mythology

In Greek mythology, Gorgophone (Ancient Greek: Γοργοφόνη, lit. 'Gorgon-slayer') was the name of two different women.

- Gorgophone, daughter of Perseus.
- Gorgophone, a Libyan princess as one of the 50 Danaïdes. She married and murdered Proteus, son of King Aegyptus of Egypt, on their wedding night obeying the command of their father, King Danaus. Her mother was Elephantis and thus full sister of Hypermnestra, who saved her husband Lynceus and became the ancestress of the Argead dynasty.
