= Antheleia =

Antheleia or Anthelea (Ancient Greek: Ἀνθήλεια, lit. 'flowery' or 'blossom'), in Greek mythology, was one of the 50 Danaïdes as a daughter of King Danaus of Libya (and later Argos) and the naiad Polyxo. On the orders of her father, she married and murdered her cousin–husband Cisseus, son of King Aegyptus of Egypt and the naiad Caliadne.
