= Myrmidone =

In Greek mythology, the name Myrmidone (Ancient Greek: Μυρμιδών, romanized: Myrmidón) may refer to:

- Myrmidone, one of the Danaïdes, who married and killed Mineus, a son of Aegyptus.
- Myrmidone of Lemnos, who killed Hypsipyle's two half-brothers, Cydon and Crenaeus, and Hypsipyle's fiancé Gyas on the night the Lemnian men were massacred by their women.
