= Obrimus (disambiguation) =

- Obrimus is a genus of phasmids in the family Heteropterygidae

Obrimus or Obrimos may also refer to:

- Obrimus, possible name for Bromius (son of Aegyptus)
- Obrimos, a faction from the role-playing game Mage: The Awakening
