= Pieria (mythology) =

Wife of Danaus

In Greek mythology, Pieria (/ˌpaɪˈɪəriə/; Ancient Greek: Πιερία, romanized: Piería) was one of the multiple wives of King Danaus of Libya. By the latter, she bore six princesses: Actaea, Podarce, Dioxippe, Adite, Ocypete and Pylarge. These Danaides married their cousins, sons of King Aegyptus of Egypt and Gorgo. Later on, these women slayed their husbands on their first wedding night under the command of their father. The legendary punishment for them was to try to fill up a hollow tank in Tartarus.

According to Hippostratus, Danaus had all of his progeny by a single woman, Europe, daughter of the river-god Nilus. In some accounts, he married his cousin Melia, daughter of Agenor, king of Tyre.
