= Astypalaea =

Sister of Europa in Greek mythology

In Greek mythology, Astypalaea or Astypalaia ([astiˈpalea]; Ancient Greek: Ἀστυπάλαια, lit. 'old city' or 'ancient town') or Astypale was a Phoenician princess as the daughter of King Phoenix and Perimede, daughter of Oeneus; thus she was the sister of Europa. In some accounts, her mother was called Telephe and her siblings were Peirus and again Europe. Astypale was a lover of Poseidon who seduced her, and had two sons by him: Ancaeus, King of Samos, and Eurypylos, King of Kos.

The island of Astypalaia was believed to have been named after her.
