= Glaucippe =

Glaucippe (Ancient Greek: Γλαυκίππη, romanized: Glaukippe, lit. 'gray horse' or 'gleaming mare'), in Greek mythology, is a name that may refer to:

- Glaucippe, a Libyan princess as one of the Danaïdes, 50 daughters of King Danaus of Libya (and later Argos) and the naiad Polyxo. On the orders of her father, she married (and eventually murdered) her cousin–husband Potamon, son of King Aegyptus of Egypt and the naiad Caliadne. This Glaucippe is also mentioned by Hyginus — due to his list of Danaids and Aegyptiads being poorly preserved, her husband's name is almost illegible here: *Niavius.
- Glaucippe, daughter of Xanthus and possible mother of Hecuba.
