= Pelasgus (king of Argos) =

Greek mythological figure

In Greek mythology, Pelasgus (Ancient Greek: Πελασγός, Pelasgós) also known as Gelanor, was an Inachid king of Argos.

== Family ==
Pelasgus was the son of Sthenelas, son of Crotopus, son of Agenor, son of Triopas. In some accounts, his father was the autochthon Palaechthon.

== Mythology ==
Pelasgus welcomed Danaus and the Danaïdes when they fled from Aegyptus.

=== In The Suppliants ===
In Aeschylus' play The Suppliants the Danaïdes fleeing from Egypt seek asylum from King Pelasgus of Argos, who rules a broad territory bordered by the territory of the Paeonians to the north, the Strymon (river) to the east, and Dodona, the slopes of the Pindus mountains, and the sea to the west;, that is, a territory including or north of the Thessalian Pelasgiotis. The southern boundary is not mentioned; however, Apis is said to have come to Argos from Naupactus "on the farther shore," (on the north coast of the Gulf of Corinth) implying that Pelasgus' kingdom includes all of Greece from the north of Thessaly west of the Strymon to the shores of Peloponnesian Argos where the Danaïdes landed. He claims to rule the Pelasgians and to be the "child of Palaichthon ('ancient earth') whom the earth brought forth."

The Danaïdes call the country the "Apian hills" and claim that it understands the karbana audan, which many translate as "barbarian speech" but Karba (where live the Karbanoi) is in fact a non-Greek word. They claim to descend from ancestors in ancient Argos even though they are of a "dark race" (melanthes... genos). Pelasgus admits that the land was once called Apia but compares them to the women of Libya and Egypt and wants to know how they can be from Argos on which they cite descent from Io.

In a lost play by Aeschylus, Danaan Women, he defines the original homeland of the Pelasgians as the region around Mycenae.
