= Hephaestine =

Wife of Aegyptus

In Greek mythology, Hephaestine (Ancient Greek: Ἡφαιστίνης) was one of the various spouses of Aegyptus, king of Egypt. By the latter, she became the mother of the youngest princes: Idas, Daiphron, Pandion, Arbelus, Hyperbius and Hippocorystes. Her sons were wed and slayed by their cousin-wives, daughters of King Danaus of Libya during their wedding night.

According to Hippostratus, Aegyptus had his progeny by a single woman called Eurryroe, daughter of the river-god Nilus. In some accounts, he consorted with Isaie, daughter of his uncle Agenor, king of Tyre.
