= Genesium =

Ancient town in Argolis, Greece

Coordinates: 37°30′52″N 22°43′56″E

Genesium or Genesion (Ancient Greek: Γενέσιον) or Genese (Γενέση) was a town of ancient Argolis upon the Argolic Gulf, south of Lerna, and north of the mountain pass, called Anigraea, leading into the Thyreatis. Pausanias also calls the place Genethlium or Genethlion (Γενέθλιον), and says less correctly that near it was the spring of fresh water rising in the sea, called Dine; whereas this spring of fresh water is to the south of the Anigraea. By the sea is a small sanctuary of Poseidon Genesius (Γενεσίου Ποσειδῶνος). Apobathmi was next to Genesium.

The surrounding country was called Pyramia (Πυράμια), from the monuments in the form of pyramids found here.

Its site is located near the modern Kiveri.
