= Bebryce (mythology) =

Danaid in ancient Greek mythology

Bebryce (Ancient Greek: Βεβρύκη) was in Greek mythology one of the Danaïdes, whom the 3rd-century BCE mythographer Apollonius of Rhodes called "Bryce", and from whom the Bebryces in Bithynia were believed to have derived their name. Others however derived the Bebryces from a hero, "Bebryx".

In the story of the Danaïdes, all of them were commanded to slay their husbands by Danaus, and all but Hypermnestra complied. A later tradition -- not attested before Eustathius of Thessalonica in the 12th century CE -- has it that Bebryce also refused to kill her husband, Hippolytus.
