= Phineus (son of Belus) =

Figure in Greek mythology

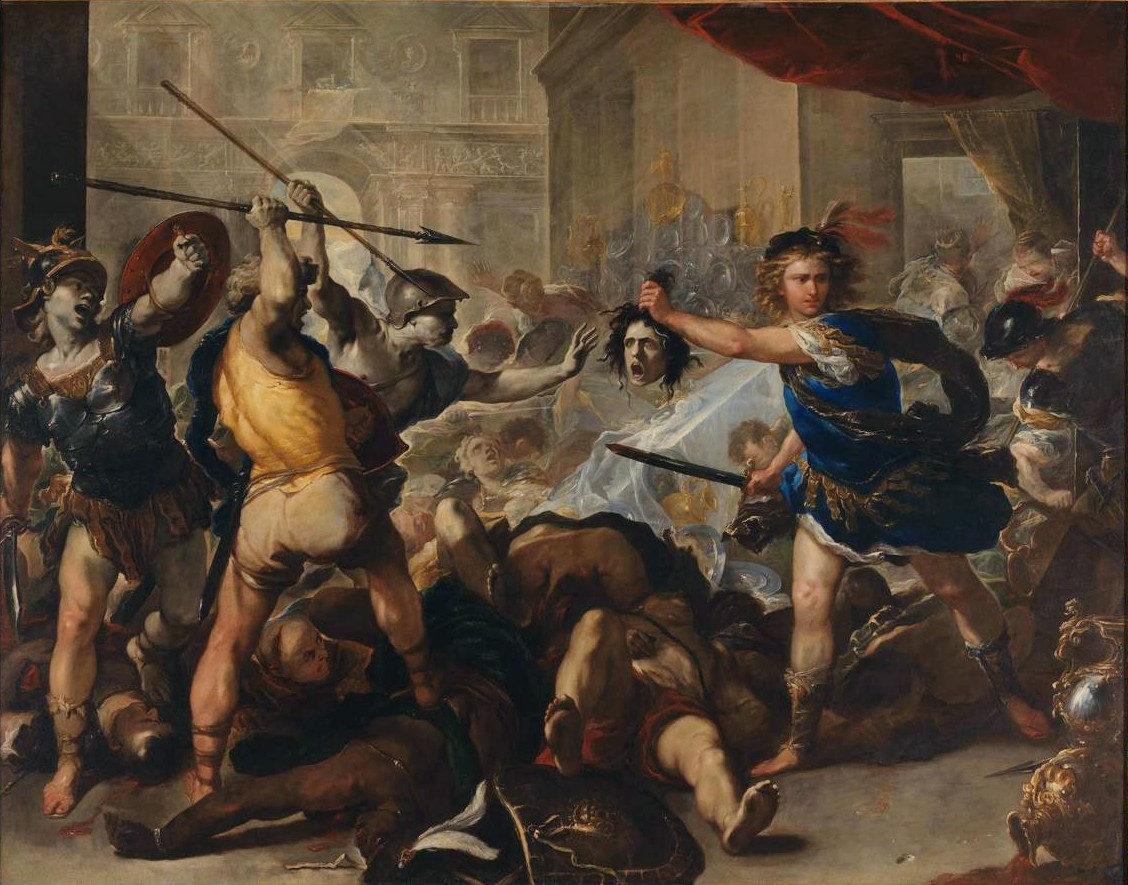
Perseus turns Phineus and his followers to stone (Luca Giordano, 17th century)

In Greek mythology, Phineus (/ˈfɪniəs, ˈfɪn.juːs/; Ancient Greek: Φινεύς, Ancient: [pʰiːněws]) was a son of Belus by Anchinoe and thus brother to Aegyptus, Danaus and Cepheus.

== Mythology ==
Phineus had been engaged to Cepheus' daughter Andromeda before she wed Perseus, and Phineus plotted against him, leading Perseus to turn him and his co-conspirators into stone by showing them the head of Medusa. The affair appears to have formed part of Euripides' lost Andromeda, and receives a single line in Apollodorus' Bibliotheca, but the only extensive ancient treatment is found in Ovid's Metamorphoses.

In Ovid's account Perseus asked for Andromeda's hand in return for saving the girl from the sea-monster Cetus, to whom an oracle had ordained Andromeda be sacrificed as punishment for her mother Cassiopeia's boast that she was more beautiful than the Nereids. Perseus was successful, but as he recounted his deeds to the court, a spear-brandishing Phineus interrupted him, angry that he was being deprived of the woman who had been betrothed to him. Cepheus scolded his brother for this outburst, pointing out that he had done nothing to help Andromeda in the crisis, but Phineus still attacked. Phineus's spear missed, and Perseus responded in kind. A bloody battle ensued until Perseus held up the head of the Gorgon, turning all his remaining enemies - except for Phineus - to stone. Amazed by this, Phineus pleaded for his life with his gaze averted, but Perseus approached him and held the head before his eyes, turning Phineus to stone as well.

== Bibliography ==
- Collard, C.; Cropp, M. (2008), Euripides VII: Fragments. Aegeus–Meleager, Loeb Classical Library, Cambridge, MA, ISBN 9780674996250.
- Dräger, P. (2007), "Phineus", in H. Cancik; H. Schneider (eds.), Brill's New Pauly: Antiquity, vol. 11 (Phi–Prok), ISBN 9789004142169.
- Kannicht, R. (2004), Tragicorum Graecorum Fragmenta, vol. V, Göttingen, ISBN 3525257554.
- Pseudo-Apollodorus, Apollodorus, The Library, with an English Translation by Sir James George Frazer, F.B.A., F.R.S. in 2 Volumes. Cambridge, MA, Harvard University Press; London, William Heinemann Ltd. 1921.
