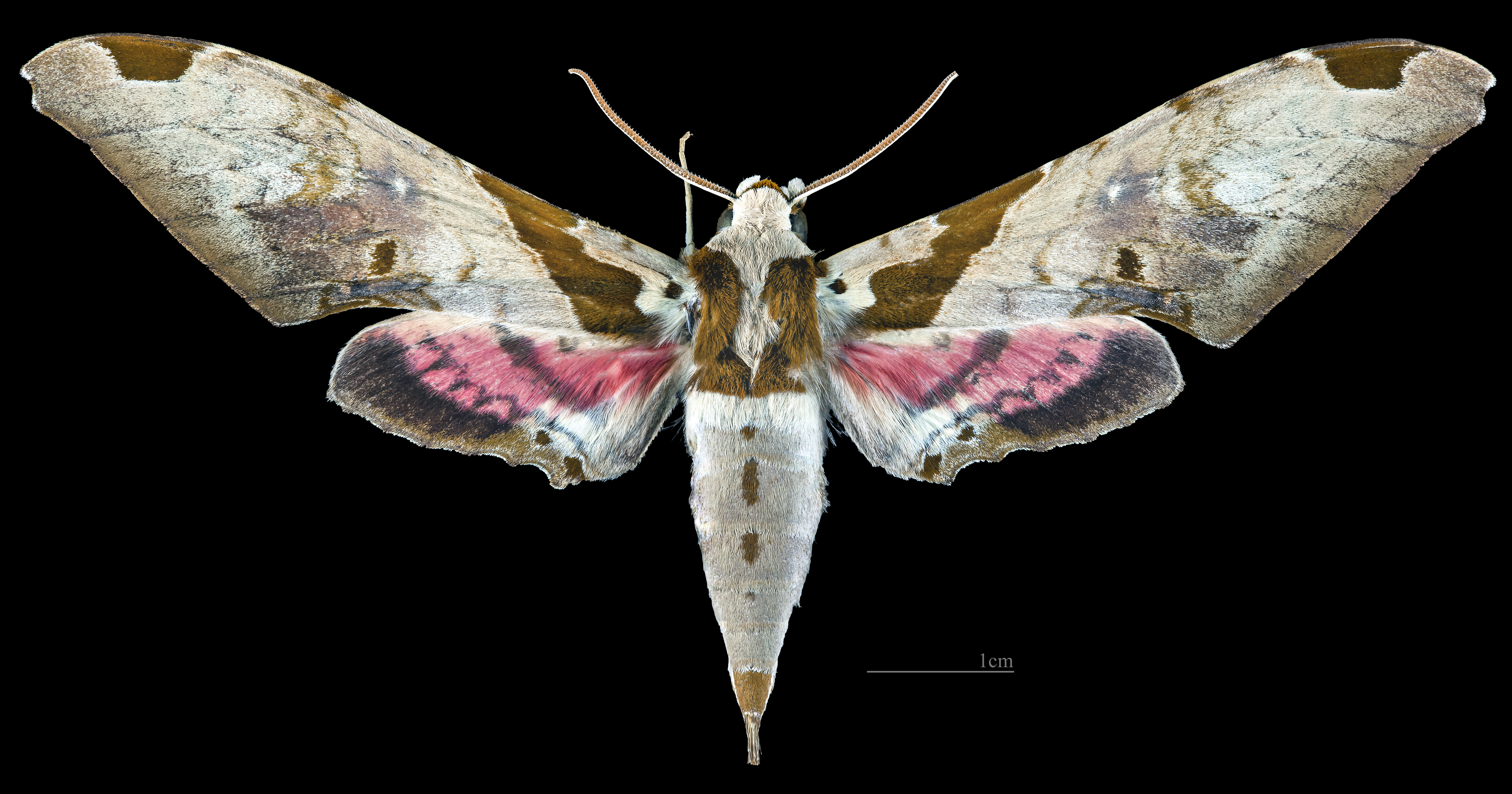
- Male, upperside
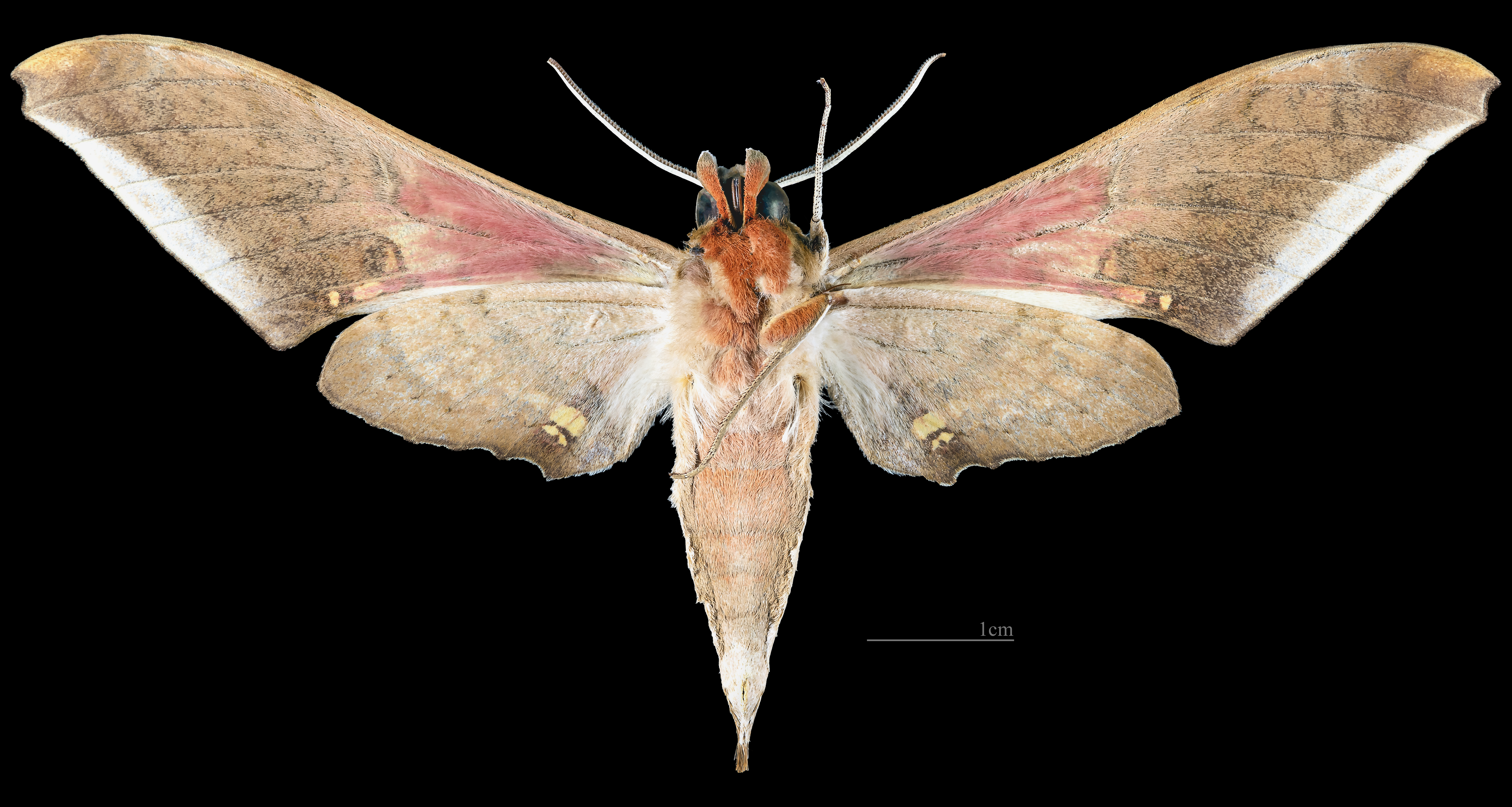
- Female, upperside

Scientific classification
- Domain: Eukaryota
- Kingdom: Animalia
- Phylum: Arthropoda
- Class: Insecta
- Order: Lepidoptera
- Family: Sphingidae
- Genus: Adhemarius
- Species: A. eurysthenes

Binomial name
- Adhemarius eurysthenes (R. Felder, 1874)

Synonyms
- Ambulyx eurysthenes R. Felder, 1874; Ambulyx crethon Boisduval, 1875; Ambulyx schausi Rothschild, 1894

= Adhemarius eurysthenes =

Species of moth

Adhemarius eurysthenes is a species of moth in the family Sphingidae. It was described by Rudolf Felder in 1874, and is known from Brazil, Colombia and Paraguay.

It is similar to Adhemarius palmeri, but the forewing upperside subbasal band is complete and irregular along proximal margin, the antemedian oblique line is very narrow, almost transverse and reaching the costa just distal to the subbasal band and the subapical patch is smaller and bluntly triangular. The hindwing upperside marginal band is also narrower.

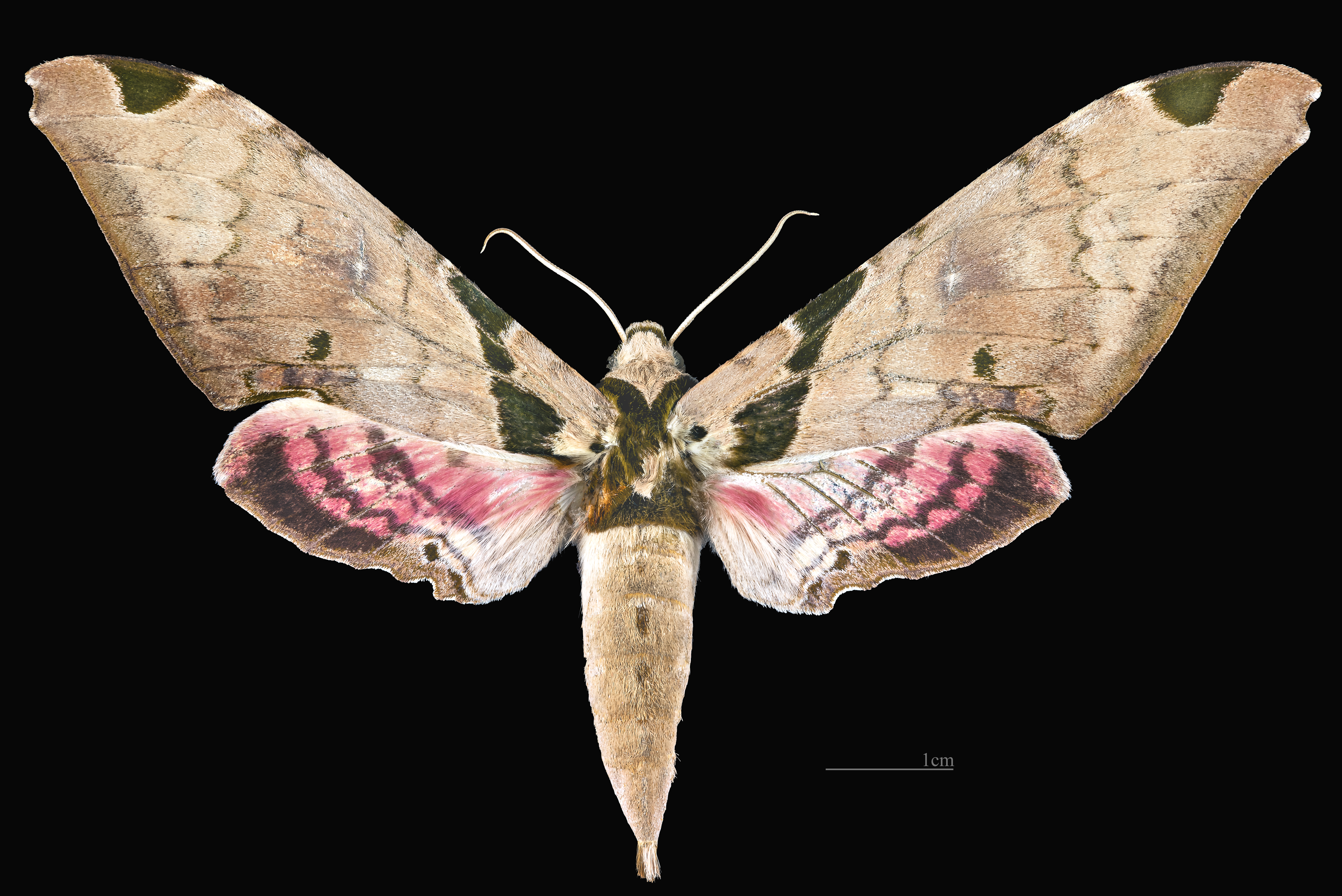
Female dorsal

There are probably at least two generations per year with peak flights in February and from July to August.

The larvae probably feed on Ocotea (such as Ocotea veraguensis, Ocotea atirrensis and Ocotea dendrodaphne) and Persea species.
