= Apobathmi =

Ancient town in Argolis, Greece

Apobathmi (Ἀπόβαθμοι) was a small town in ancient Argolis, next to the Genesium.

It took its name from Danaus landing at this spot. The surrounding country was called Pyramia (Πυράμια), from the monuments in the form of pyramids found here.
