= Memphis (mythology) =

In Greek mythology, Memphis (Ancient Greek: Μέμφις, romanized: Mémfis or Mémphis; ) was the female eponym of Memphis in Egypt. The name was attributed to several distinct characters, namely:

- Memphis, daughter of Nilus and wife of Epaphus.
- Memphis, one of the many consorts of King Danaus of Libya and mother by him of the three Danaïdes: Chrysippe, Sthenele and Cleite. These daughters wed and slew their cousin-husbands, sons of King Aegyptus of Egypt and Tyria during their wedding night. According to Hippostratus, Danaus had all of his progeny by a single woman, Europe, daughter of the river-god Nilus. In some accounts, he married his cousin Melia, daughter of Agenor, king of Tyre.
- Memphis, daughter of the Egyptian king Uchoreus, who was said to have founded the city and named it after her, and mother by Neilus of Aegyptus, the eponym of Egypt (apparently distinct from Aegyptus, brother of Danaus).
