= Alexida =

Ancient Greek mythological figure

In Greek mythology, Alexida (Ancient Greek: Ἀλεξίδη) was a daughter of Amphiaraus, from whom the Elasioi (Ἐλάσιοι), i. e. the averters of epileptic fits) were believed to be descended.
