= Automate (mythology) =

Ancient Greek mythological figure

In Greek mythology, Automate (Ancient Greek: Αὐτομάτη, lit. 'acting of one's own will' or 'of oneself') was one of the 50 Danaids as daughter of King Danaus of Libya (and later Argos) and Europa. On the orders of her father, she eventually killed on the wedding night her cousin–husband Busiris, son Aegyptus, who was betrothed to her. In another version of the myth, she was married to Architeles, the son of Achaeus, who emigrated from Phthiotis in Thessaly to Argos with his brother Archander.
