= Agave (mythology) =

Various figures in Greek Mythology

In Greek mythology, Agave (/əˈɡeɪviː/; Ancient Greek: Ἀγαύη, romanized: Agaúē, lit. 'illustrious, noble' or 'high-born') may refer to the following characters:

- Agave or Agaue one of the 50 Nereids, sea-nymph daughter of the 'Old Man of the Sea' Nereus and the Oceanid Doris. Agave and her other sisters appeared to Thetis when she cries out in sympathy for the grief of Achilles for Patroclus.
- Agave, one of the 50 Danaïdes, as daughter of Danaus, king of Libya (and later Argos) and Europa, a queen. Following the instructions of her father, she married and eventually killed her cousin–husband Lycus, son of Aegyptus and Argyphia.
- Agave, daughter of Cadmus and mother of Pentheus and Epirus.
- Agave, an Amazon.
