= Idas (mythology) =

Greek mythological figure

In Greek mythology, Idas (/ˈiːdəs/, Ancient Greek: Ἴδας, translit. Ídas) may refer to the following individuals:

- Idas, son of Aphareus
- Idas, one of the Dactyls.
- Idas, an Egyptian prince as son of Aegyptus and Hephaestine. He married Hippodice, daughter of Danaus who killed him during their wedding night.
- Idas, one of the Ethiopian Chiefs, was in the court of Cepheus when the fight broke between Perseus and Phineus. He kept neutral, but was nevertheless accidentally killed by Phineus.
- Idas, son of Clymenus and Epicaste, brother of Harpalyce and Therager.
- Idas, an Athenian son of Arcas and one of the Sacrificial victims of the Minotaur.
- Idas, an Elean from Pisa who participated in the foot-race at Opheltes' funeral games. During the war of the Seven against Thebes he came in succour of Hippomedon, one of the Seven.
- Idas, a man from Onchestus. He was a defender of Thebes in war of the Seven against Thebes and was slain by Tydeus.
- Idas, one of those comrades of Diomedes in Italy who turned into birds.
- Idas, one of the soldiers of Aeneas in Italy. He was killed by Turnus, the man who opposed Aeneas in Italy.
