= Argyphia (mythology) =

Wife of Aegyptus

In Greek mythology, Argyphia (Ancient Greek: Ἀργυφίη) was one of the multiple consorts of Aegyptus, king of Egypt. She was a woman of royal blood and by the latter became the mother of six princes: Lynceus, Proteus, Busiris, Enceladus, Lycus and Daiphron. Her sons (except Lynceus) were married and murdered by their cousin-wives, daughters of King Danaus of Libya during their wedding night. The spared prince coupled with Hypermnestra and became the ancestors of famous Argives: Acrisius, Danae, Perseus, Heracles, etc.

According to Hippostratus, Aegyptus had his progeny by a single woman called Eurryroe, daughter of the river-god Nilus. In some accounts, he consorted with Isaie, daughter of his uncle Agenor, king of Tyre.
