= Idmon =

Disambiguation article

In Greek mythology, Idmon (Ancient Greek: Ἴδμων, lit. 'having knowledge of' or 'the knowing') may refer to the following individuals:

- Idmon, one of the fifty sons of King Aegyptus of Egypt and Gorgo, who married and was killed by her cousin–wife Danaid Pylarge.
- Idmon, father of Arachne, and perhaps her brother Phalanx too.
- Idmon, an Argonaut seer and son of Apollo or Abas, and Princess Cyrene.
- Idmon, herald of Turnus.
- Idmon, a figure briefly mentioned in Statius' Thebaid. He came from Epidaurus and was portrayed in the poem cleansing Tydeus' wounds after a battle.
