= Hyperbius =

In Greek mythology, the name Hyperbius (Ancient Greek: Ὑπέρβιος Ὑpérvios means "of overwhelming strength") may refer to:

- Hyperbius, son of Ares, reputedly the first to have killed an animal.
- Hyperbius, son of Aegyptus, who married and was killed by the Danaid Celaeno, or by Eupheme.
- Hyperbius, son of Oenops, a defender of Thebes in the war of the Seven against Thebes, appointed by Eteocles to defend the Oncaidian Gate against Hippomedon. He had an image of Zeus on his shield.
- Hyperbius, an Athenian, brother of Agrolas or Euryalus. The two brothers were credited with inventing the technique of building with bricks, and with construction of the first brick houses in Athens, as well as of the wall around Acropolis.
- Hyperbius, a Corinthian credited with invention of the potter's wheel.
