= Tyria (mythology) =

Wife of Aegyptus

In Greek mythology, Tyria (Ancient Greek: Τυρία) was one of the various consorts of Aegyptus, king of Egypt. By the latter, she became the mother to three princes: Clitus, Chrysippus and Sthenelus. Her sons were wed and slain by their cousin-wives, daughters of King Danaus of Libya and Memphis during their wedding night. Tyria was probably a Phoenician woman as her name suggests.

According to Hippostratus, Aegyptus had his progeny by a single woman called Eurryroe, daughter of the river-god Nilus. In some accounts, he consorted with Isaie, daughter of his uncle Agenor, king of Tyre.
