= Isaia (mythology) =

In Greek mythology, Isaia or Isaie (Ancient Greek: Iσαίη) was a Phoenician princess as the daughter of King Agenor of Tyre.

== Mythology ==
Isaie’s mother was Damno, daughter of King Belus of Egypt, and the sister of Phoenix and Melia. With the latter, they became the wives of their first cousins (and uncles) Danaus and Aegyptus, the sons of Belus.

Together with Aegyptus, Isaia gave birth to all of his male progeny. Otherwise, the mother of these 50 sons was the naiad Eurryroe, daughter of the river-god Nilus, according to Hippostratus. In one account, Aegyptus's children were born to different mothers including Argyphia, Tyria, the naiad Caliadne, Gorgo and Hephaestine.
