= Euryrrhoe =

Daughter of the Egyptian river-god Nilus

In Greek mythology, Euryrrhoe (Ancient Greek: Εùρυῥῤόης) was the daughter of the Egyptian river-god Nilus.

== Mythology ==
According to Hippostratus, Eurryroe was said to be the mother alone of the 50 sons of King Aegyptus of Egypt. Her sister Europa, also bore the Libyan king Danaus's 50 daughters.

Otherwise, the wives of Aegyptus and Danaus were their cousins (and nieces), Isaia and Melia, respectively. They were daughters of King Agenor and Damno, daughter of Belus. In one account, Aegyptus's children were bore to different mothers including Argyphia, Tyria, the naiad Caliadne, Gorgo and Hephaestine.
