= Europa (mythology) =

Disambiguation

In Greek mythology, Europa (/jʊəˈroʊpə, jə-/; Ancient Greek: Εὐρώπη, romanized: Eurṓpē; Attic Greek pronunciation: [eu̯.rɔ̌ː.pɛː]) or Europe is the name of the following figures:

- Europa, one of the 3,000 Oceanids, water-nymph daughters of the Titans Oceanus and his sister-spouse Tethys. In some accounts, her mother was called Parthenope and her sister was Thrace. Europa was the mother of Dodonaeus (Dodon) by Zeus.
- Europa, second wife of Phoroneus and mother of Niobe.
- Europa, a Phoenician princess from whom the name of the continent Europe was taken. She was the lover of Zeus.
- Europe, a queen in her country and one of the many consorts of Danaus, king of Libya. She conceived four of the Danaïdes namely: Amymone, Automate, Agave and Scaea. These women wed and slayed their cousin-husbands, sons of King Aegyptus of Egypt and Argyphia during their wedding night. According to Hippostratus, Europe was the daughter of the river-god Nilus and begotten all the 50 daughters of Danaus. In some accounts, Danaus later married Melia, daughter of his uncle Agenor, king of Tyre.
- Europa, daughter of the giant Tityos. She bore, beside the banks of the Cephisus, a son Euphemus to the god Poseidon.
- Europe, an Athenian maiden who was the daughter of Laodicus. She was sent by her people to Crete. as one of the sacrificial victims of Minotaur.
- Europe, a surname of Demeter.
