= Melia (mythology) =

Set index

In Greek mythology, Melia or Melie (Ancient Greek: Μελία or Μελίη, romanized: Meliê, lit. 'ash-tree') was the name of several figures. The name Melia comes from μελία, the ancient Greek word for ash-tree. In the plural, the Meliae were a class of nymphs associated with trees, particularly ash-trees. There were several other nymphs (or possible nymphs) named Melia, not necessarily associated with trees, these include:

- Melia, a Theban cult figure, who was the mother of Tenerus and Ismenus, by Apollo. She was said to be a daughter of Oceanus.
- Melia, mother of Phoroneus and Aegialeus, by her brother Inachus, the Argive river-god. She was also said to be a daughter of Oceanus.
- Melia, an Oceanid and a Bithynian nymph, who was the mother, by Poseidon, of Amycus, king of the Bebryces.
- Melia, the mother by Silenus of Dolion, the eponym of the Doliones. This is according to the third-century BC poet and grammarian Alexander Aetolus, as reported by the late first-century BC-early first-century AD geographer Strabo.
- Melia, the mother by Apollo of Keos, the eponym of the island Keos, according to the third-century BC poet Callimachus.

Two other personages named Melia, are known from scholia citing the fifth-century BC mythographer Pherecydes:

- Melia, daughter of King Agenor of Tyre and Damno (daughter of King Belus of Egypt), and the sister of Phoenix and Isaie. She and her sister became the wives of their first cousins (and uncles) Danaus and Aegyptus, sons of Belus.
- Melia, one of the Niobids, the children of Amphion and his wife Niobe. She and her sisters were slain by Artemis while her brothers were slain by Apollo, because of a boast by Niobe. According to the scholia, Pherecydes said she had seven brothers: Alalkomenus, Phereus, Eudoros, Lysippos, Xanthus, and Argeius, and six sisters: Chione, Clytie, Hore, Damasippe, and Pelopia.
