= Lynceus (mythology) =

Several men in Greek mythology

In Greek mythology, Lynceus (/ˈlɪnsiːəs, -sjuːs/; Ancient Greek: Λυγκεύς, romanized: Lunkeús, lit. 'lynx-like') may refer to the following personages:

- Lynceus, one of the 50 Sons of Aegyptus.
- Lynceus, a king in Thrace and husband of Lathusa, who was a friend of Procne. Procne's husband Tereus gave his own wife's sister Philomela to him after ravishing her, but Lathusa sent Philomela to Procne.
- Lynceus, son of Aphareus and one of the Argonauts.
- Lynceus, one of the companions of Aeneas in Italy who was beheaded by Turnus.
- Lynceus, one of the dogs of the hunter Actaeon.

Also, Lynceus is a crater on Janus (moon of Saturn), named after Lynceus of Messenia in the legend of Castor and Pollux.
