= Hippostratus =

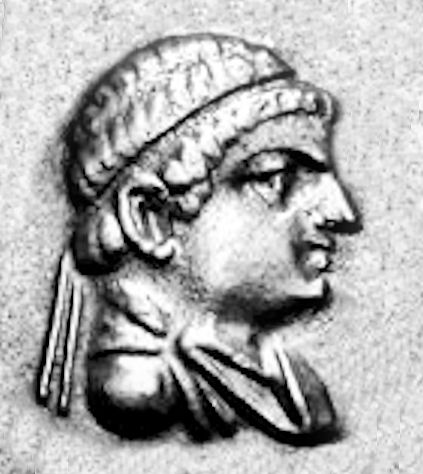
- Portrait of Hippostratus

Indo-Greek king
- Reign: 65–55 BC

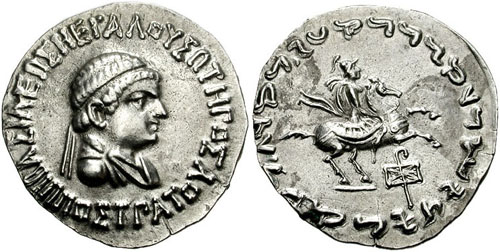
Tetradrachm of Hippostratus. Obv: Bust of Hippostratus with Greek legend ΒΑΣΙΛΕΩΣ ΜΕΓΑΛΟΥ ΣΩΤΗΡΟΣ ΙΠΠΟΣΤΡΑΤΟΥ "Of Great King Saviour Hippostratus". Rev: King on horseback, galloping. Kharoshthi legend: MAHARAJASA TRATASA MAHATASA JAYAMTASA HIPUSTRATASA "King Hippostratus, the Great Saviour and Conqueror.

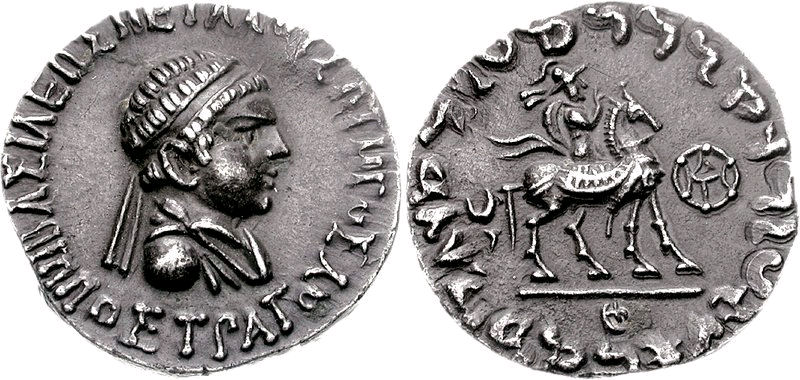
Tetradrachm of Hippostratos. Obv: Bust of Hippostratos with Greek legend BΑΣΙΛΕΩΣ ΜΕΓΑΛΟΥ ΣΩΤΗΡΟΣ ΙΠΠΟΣΤΡΑΤΟΥ "Great King Saviour Hippostratus". Rev: King on horseback, walking, making a gesture of benediction. Kharoshthi legend: MAHARAJASA TRATASA MAHATASA JAYAMTASA HIPUSTRATASA "King Hippostratus, the Great Saviour and Conqueror.

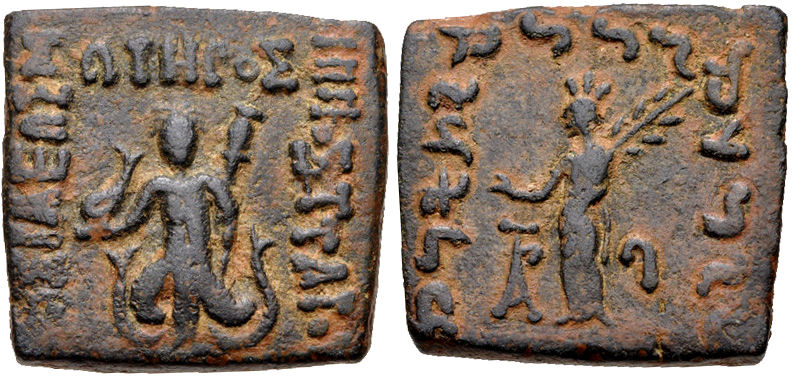
Hippostratus with Triton holding dolphin and rudder and Tyche.

Hippostratus (Ancient Greek: Ἱππόστρατος, romanized: Hippostratos, meaning "army of horses") was an Indo-Greek king who ruled central and north-western Punjab and Pushkalavati. Bopearachchi dates Hippostratus to 65 to 55 BC whereas R. C. Senior suggests 60 to 50 BC.

== Rule ==
In Bopearachchi's reconstruction Hippostratus came to power as the successor to Apollodotus II, in the western part of his kingdom, while the weak Dionysius ascended to the throne in the eastern part. Senior assumes that the reigns of Apollodotus II and Hippostratos overlapped somewhat; in that case Hippostratus first ruled a kingdom situated to the west of Apollodotus' dominions.

Just like Apollodotus II, Hippostratus calls himself Soter, "Saviour", on all his coins, and on some coins he also assumes the title Basileos Megas, "Great King", which he inherited from Apollodotus II. This may support Senior's scenario that Hippostratus extended his kingdom after Apollodotus' death. The relationship between these two kings remains uncertain due to lack of sources. Hippostratos did not, however, use the symbol of standing Athena Alkidemos, which was common to all other kings thought to be related to Apollodotus II. The two kings share only one monogram.

The quantity and quality of the coinage of Hippostratus indicate a quite powerful king. Hippostratus seems to have fought rather successfully against the Indo-Scythian invaders, led by the Scythian king Azes I, but was ultimately defeated and became the last western Indo-Greek king.

== Coinage ==
Hippostratus issued silver coins with a diademed portrait on the obverse, and three reverses. The first is the image of a king on prancing horse, a common type which was most frequently used by the earlier kings Antimachus II and Philoxenus. The second reverse also portrays a king on horseback, but the horse is walking and the king making a benediction gesture - this type resembles a rare type of Apollodotus II. The third is a standing goddess, perhaps Tyche.

Hippostratus struck several bronzes of types used by several kings:

- Serpent-legged deity (as used by Telephus) / standing goddess.
- Apollo/tripod (Apollodotus II, several earlier kings)
- Sitting Zeus-Mithras / horse, reminiscent of coins of Hermaeus.
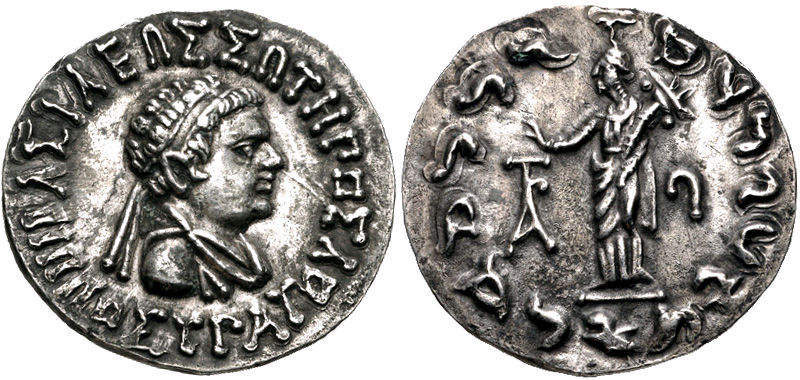
Hippostratus bareheaded with Tyche with Greek legend BΑΣΙΛΕΩΣ ΣΩΤΗΡΟΣ ΙΠΠΟΣΤΡΑΤΟΥ "Of King Saviour Hippostratus".

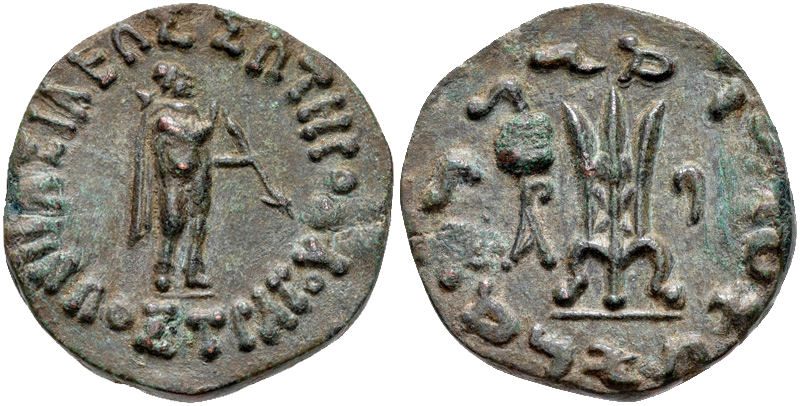
Hippostratus with standing Apollo and tripod with Greek legend BΑΣΙΛΕΩΣ ΣΩΤΗΡΟΣ ΙΠΠΟΣΤΡΑΤΟΥ "Of King Saviour Hippostratus".

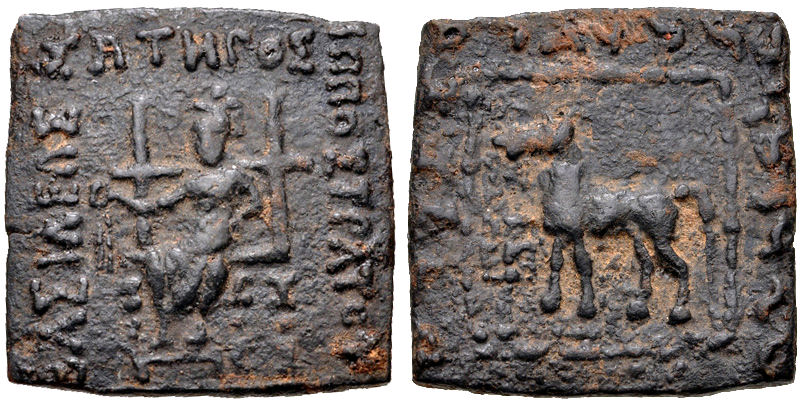
Hippostratus with Zeus-Mitra and horse with Greek legend BΑΣΙΛΕΩΣ ΣΩΤΗΡΟΣ ΙΠΠΟΣΤΡΑΤΟΥ "Of King Saviour Hippostratus".

=== Overstrikes ===
Azes I overstruck several of Hippostratus' coins.

== See also ==
- Indo-Greek Kingdom
- Greco-Buddhism
- Indo-Scythians

Preceded by Apollodotus II	Indo-Greek Ruler (in Western Punjab); 65 – 55 BC	Succeeded by Azes I (as Indo-Scythian King)

	Greco-Bactrian kings		Indo-Greek kings					
Territories/ dates	West Bactria	East Bactria	Paropamisade	Arachosia	Gandhara	Western Punjab	Eastern Punjab	Mathura
326-325 BCE	Campaigns of Alexander the Great in India						Nanda Empire	
312 BCE	Creation of the Seleucid Empire						Creation of the Maurya Empire	
305 BCE	Seleucid Empire after Mauryan war		Maurya Empire					
280 BCE	Foundation of Ai-Khanoum							
255–239 BCE	Independence of the Greco-Bactrian kingdom Diodotus I		Emperor Ashoka (268-232 BCE)					
239–223 BCE	Diodotus II							
230–200 BCE	Euthydemus I							
200–190 BCE	Demetrius I				Sunga Empire			
190-185 BCE	Euthydemus II							
190–180 BCE	Agathocles			Pantaleon				
185–170 BCE	Antimachus I							
180–160 BCE			Apollodotus I					
175–170 BCE	Demetrius II							
160–155 BCE			Antimachus II					
170–145 BCE	Eucratides I							
155–130 BCE	Yuezhi occupation, loss of Ai-Khanoum	Eucratides II; Plato; Heliocles I	Menander I					
130–120 BCE	Yuezhi occupation		Zoilus I		Agathoclea			Yavanarajya inscription
120–110 BCE			Lysias		Strato I			Yavanarajya inscription
110–100 BCE			Antialcidas		Heliocles II			Yavanarajya inscription
100 BCE			Polyxenus		Demetrius III			Yavanarajya inscription
100–95 BCE			Philoxenus					Yavanarajya inscription
95–90 BCE			Diomedes	Amyntas		Epander		Yavanarajya inscription
90 BCE			Theophilus	Peucolaus		Thraso		Yavanarajya inscription
90–85 BCE			Nicias	Menander II		Artemidorus		Yavanarajya inscription
90–70 BCE			Hermaeus	Archebius				Yavanarajya inscription
			Yuezhi occupation		Maues (Indo-Scythian)			
75–70 BCE				Vonones	Telephus	Apollodotus II		
65–55 BCE				Spalirises		Hippostratus	Dionysius	
55–35 BCE					Azes I (Indo-Scythians)		Zoilus II	
55–35 BCE					Vijayamitra/ Azilises		Apollophanes	
25 BCE – 10 CE				Gondophares	Zeionises	Kharahostes	Strato II; Strato III	
				Gondophares (Indo-Parthian)			Rajuvula (Indo-Scythian)	
			Kujula Kadphises (Kushan Empire)				Bhadayasa (Indo-Scythian)	Sodasa (Indo-Scythian)
