= Danaus =

Greek mythological king

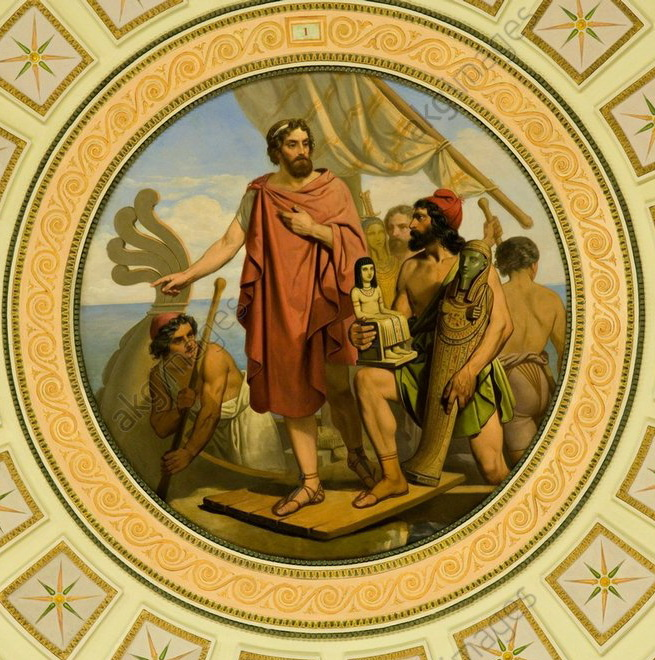

In Greek mythology, Danaus (/ˈdæneɪ.əs/, /ˈdæni.əs/; Ancient Greek: Δαναός, romanized: Danaós) was the king of Libya. His myth is a foundation legend of Argos, one of the foremost Mycenaean cities of the Peloponnesus. In Homer's Iliad, "Danaans" ("tribe of Danaus") and "Argives" commonly designate the Greek forces opposed to the Trojans.

== Family ==
=== Parents and siblings ===
Danaus, was the son of King Belus of Egypt and the naiad Achiroe, daughter of the river god Nilus, or of Sida, eponym of Sidon. He was the twin brother of Aegyptus, king of Egypt while Euripides adds two others, Cepheus, king of Ethiopia and Phineus, betrothed of Andromeda.

=== Danaides ===
Danaus had fifty daughters, the Danaides, twelve of whom were born to the naiad Polyxo; six to Pieria; two to Elephantis; four to Queen Europa; ten to the hamadryad nymphs Atlanteia and Phoebe; seven to an Aethiopian woman; three to Memphis; two to Herse and lastly four to Crino. According to Hippostratus, Danaus had all these progenies begotten by Europa, the daughter of Nilus. In some accounts, Danaus married Melia while Aegyptus consorted with Isaie, these two women were daughters of their uncle Agenor, King of Tyre, and their possible sister, Damno who was described as the daughter of Belus.

== Mythology ==
=== Flight from Aegyptus ===
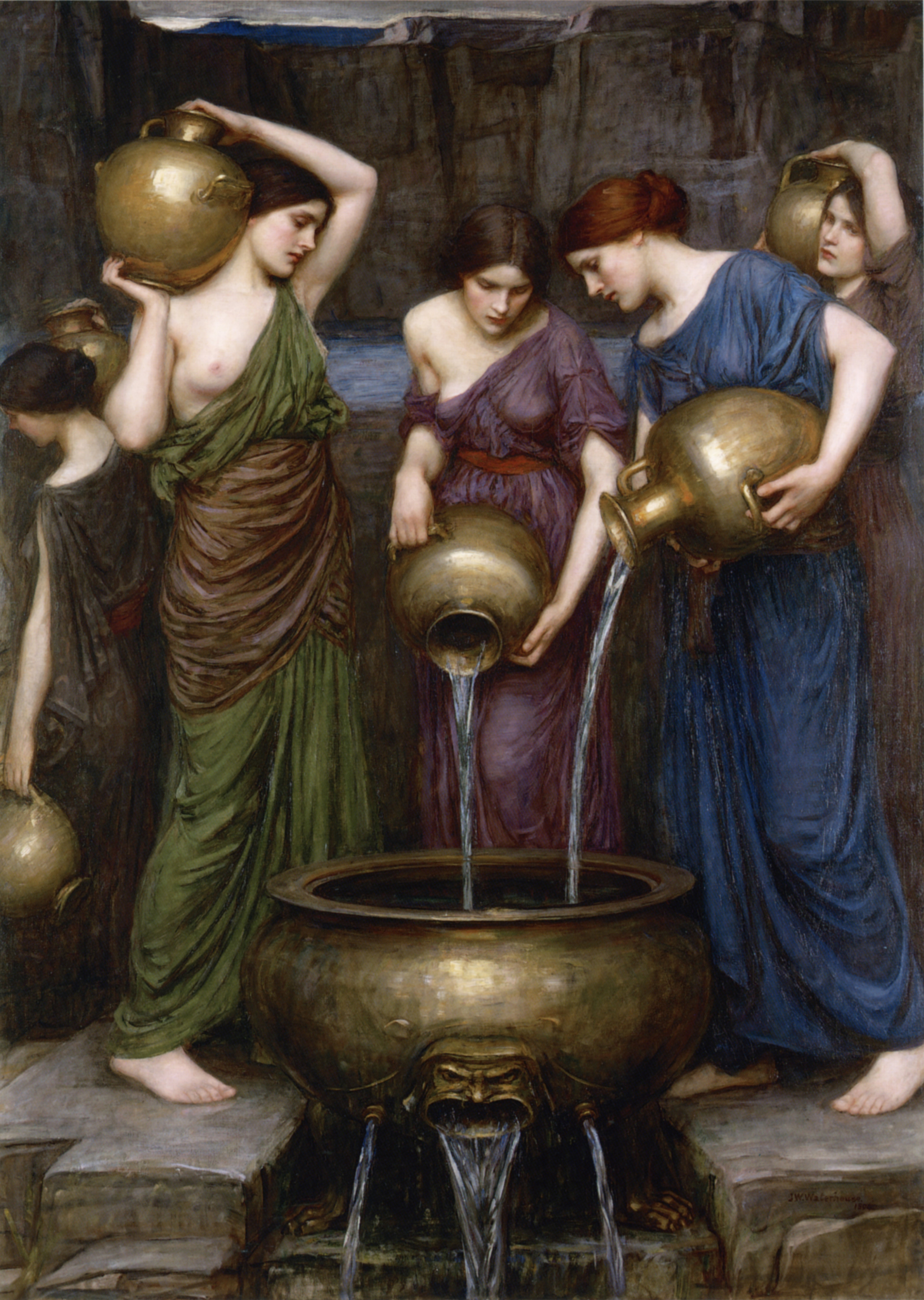
The Danaides (1904), a Pre-Raphaelite interpretation by John William Waterhouse

After Aegyptus commanded that his fifty sons should marry the Danaides, Danaus elected to flee instead. To that purpose, he built a ship on the advice of Athena, the first ship that ever was. In it, he fled to Argos, to which he was connected by his descent from Io, a priestess of Hera at Argos, who was wooed by Zeus and turned into a heifer and pursued by Hera until she found asylum in Egypt. Argos at the time was ruled by King Pelasgus, the eponym of all autochthonous [indigenous] inhabitants who had lived in Greece since the beginning, also called Gelanor ("he who laughs"). The Danaides asked Pelasgus for protection when they arrived, the event portrayed in The Suppliants by Aeschylus. Protection was granted after a vote by the Argives.

When Pausanias visited Argos in the 2nd century CE, he related the succession of Danaus to the throne, judged by the Argives, who "from the earliest times ... have loved freedom and self-government, and they limited to the utmost the authority of their kings":

"On coming to Argos he claimed the kingdom against Gelanor, the son of Sthenelus. Many plausible arguments were brought forward by both parties, and those of Sthenelas were considered as fair as those of his opponent; so the people, who were sitting in judgment, put off, they say, the decision to the following day. At dawn a wolf fell upon a herd of oxen that was pasturing before the wall, and attacked and fought with the bull that was the leader of the herd. It occurred to the Argives that Gelanor was like the bull and Danaus like the wolf, for as the wolf will not live with men, so Danaus up to that time had not lived with them. It was because the wolf overcame the bull that Danaus won the kingdom. Accordingly, believing that Apollo had brought the wolf on the herd, he founded a sanctuary of Apollo Lycius."

The sanctuary of Apollo Lykeios ("wolf-Apollo", but also Apollo of the twilight) was still the most prominent feature of Argos in Pausanias's time: in the sanctuary, the tourist might see the throne of Danaus himself, an eternal flame, called the fire of Phoroneus.

=== Murdered bridegrooms ===
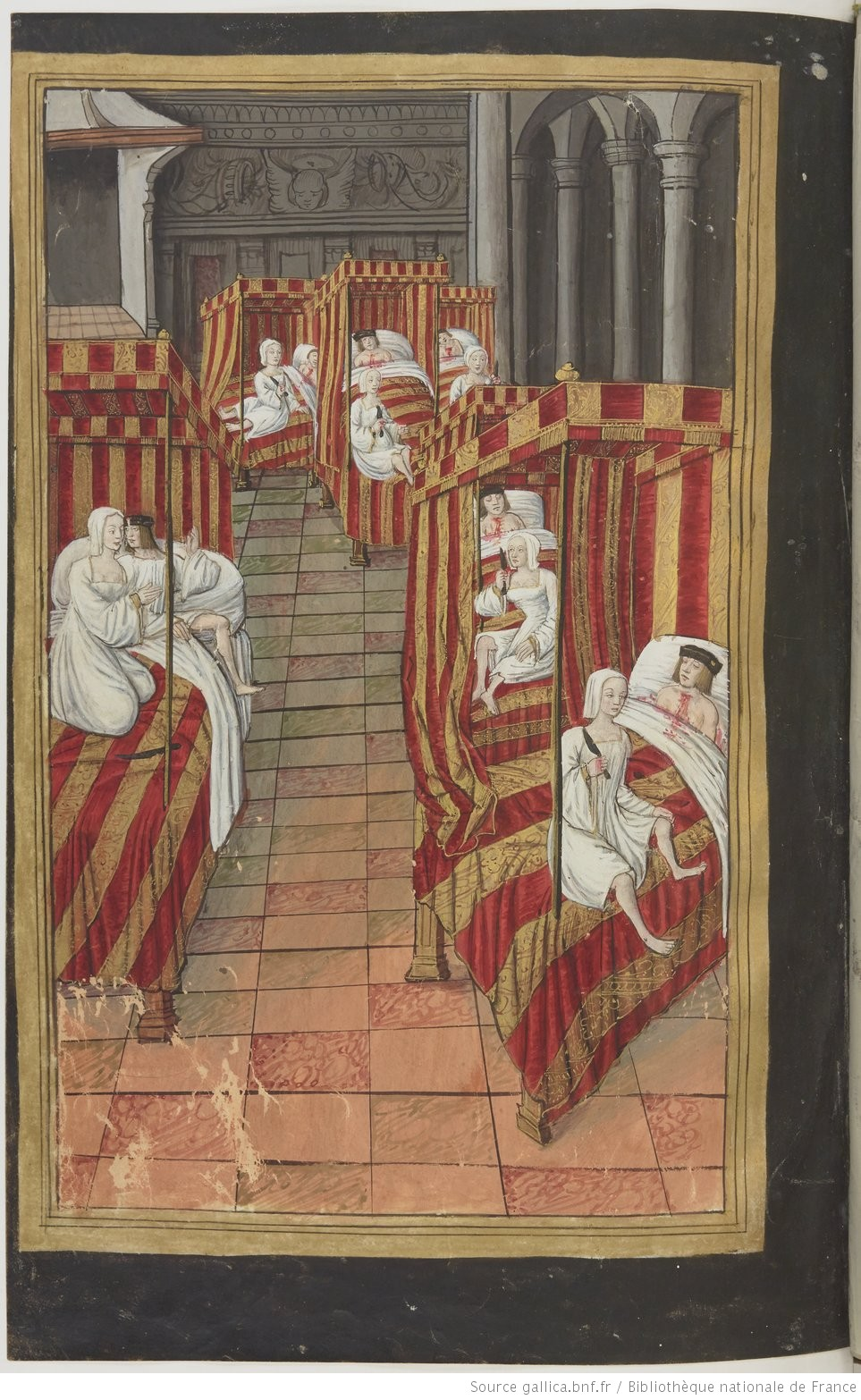
The Danaides kill their husbands, miniature by Robinet Testard.

When Aegyptus and his fifty sons arrived to take the Danaides, Danaus gave them in order to spare the Argives the pain of a battle. However, he instructed his daughters to kill their husbands on their wedding night. Forty-nine followed through and subsequently buried the heads of their bridegrooms in Lerna; but one, Hypermnestra, refused because her husband, Lynceus, honored her wish to remain a virgin. Danaus was angry with his disobedient daughter and threw her to the Argive courts. Aphrodite intervened and saved her. Lynceus and Hypermnestra then began a dynasty of Argive kings (the Danaid Dynasty). Some sources relate that Amymone, the "blameless" Danaid, and/or Bryce (Bebryce) also spared their husbands.

=== Aftermath ===
After his sons' deaths, Aegyptus escaped to Aroe in Greece and died there. His monument was shown in the temple of Serapis at Patrae.

In some versions, Lynceus later killed Danaus as revenge for the death of his brothers.

The remaining forty-nine Danaides had their grooms chosen by a common mythic competition: A foot-race was held, and the order in which the potential Argive grooms finished decided their brides (compare the myth of Atalanta). Two of the grooms were Archander and Architeles, sons of Achaeus: They married Scaea and Automate, respectively.

In later accounts, the Danaides were punished in Tartarus by being forced to carry water in a jug to fill a bath without a bottom (or with a leak) and thereby wash off their sins, but the bath was never filled because the water was always leaking out.

=== Danaus in Rhodes ===
Another account of the travels of Danaus gave him three daughters, Ialysos, Kamiros and Lindos, who were worshipped in the cities that took their names in the island of Rhodes, Ialysos, Kamiros and Lindos (but see also Cercaphus). According to Rhodian mythographers who informed Diodorus Siculus, Danaus would have stopped and founded a sanctuary to Athena Lindia on the way from Egypt to Greece. Herodotus heard that Danaus's daughters founded the temple at Lindos. Ken Dowden observes that once the idea is dismissed that myth is directly narrating the movements of historical persons, that the loci of Danaian institutions at Lindos in Rhodes as well as at Argos suggest a Mycenaean colony sent to Rhodes from the Argolid, a tradition, in fact, that Strabo reports.

=== Other feats ===
Danaus was credited as the inventor of wells and is said to have migrated from Egypt about 1485 B.C. into that part of Greece previously known as Argos Dipsion. Notes in Pliny the Elder's, Natural History also added that:

"He [i.e., Danaus] may have introduced wells into Greece, but they had, long before his time, been employed in Egypt and in other countries. The term "Dipsion," "thirsting," which it appears had been applied to the district of Argos, may seem to render it probable, that, before the arrival of Danaus, the inhabitants had not adopted any artificial means of supplying themselves with water. But this country, we are told, is naturally well supplied with water."

The town Apobathmi in ancient Argolis took its name from Danaus landing at this spot.

== The Danais ==
The epic Danais was written by one of the cyclic poets; the name of the author and the narration of these events does not survive, but the Danaid tetralogy of Aeschylus undoubtedly draws upon its material. It is represented in the table of epics in the received canon on the very fragmentary "Borgia table" as "Danaides".

A U.S. federal judge used the version of the legend in which the Danaides are forced to perform an impossible task as a simile for the judge's task of determining whether a case "arises under" the Constitution, laws, or treaties of the United States.

== Argive genealogy ==
Argive genealogy in Greek mythology

Oceanus	Tethys
Inachus	Melia
Zeus	Io	Phoroneus
Epaphus	Memphis
Libya	Poseidon
Achiroë	Belus	Agenor	Telephassa
Danaus	Elephantis	Aegyptus	Cadmus	Cilix	Europa	Phoenix
Mantineus	Hypermnestra	Lynceus	Harmonia	Zeus
Sparta	Lacedaemon	Ocalea	Abas	Polydorus	Agave	Sarpedon	Rhadamanthus
Eurydice	Acrisius	Autonoë	Ino	Minos
Zeus	Danaë	Semele	Zeus
Perseus	Dionysus

Colour key:

Male
Female
Deity

== Notes ==
Regnal titles
Preceded by Gelanor	King of Argos	Succeeded by Lynceus
