= Demonassa =

Several figures in Greek mythology

In Greek mythology, Demonassa or Demonassae (Ancient Greek: Δημώνασσα) was a name attributed to five women.

- Demonassa, mother of Eurydamas and Eurytion, king of Phthia, by Irus. Otherwise, Eurydamas parentage was given as Ctimenus from Dolopian Ctimene.
- Demonassa, wife of King Poeas of Meliboea, by whom she bore Philoctetes. Otherwise, the mother of the hero was called Methone.
- Demonassa, mother of Aegialeus by Adrastus.
- Demonassa, daughter of Amphiaraus, king of Argos and Eriphyle, and thus, sister to Alcmaeon, Amphilochus, Eurydice, Alcmena and Alexida. She married Thersander and had a son, Tisamenus.

== Namesake ==
In his Περί Τύχης Δεύτερος (On Fortune II) discourse, Greek orator, Dion Chrysostom, tells the story of a Cypriot stateswoman and lawgiver by that name. She enacted three strict laws, the first, if a woman was guilty of adultery her hair should be cut off and she should become a prostitute, the second, whoever commits suicide shall be cast out without a burial and the third law forbade the slaughter of a plough-ox with death of the perpetrator as punishment. Demonassa had three children, a daughter and two sons and each of them transgressed one of the laws their mother had enacted. Unable to live with her grief but also respecting her own laws, she leaped into molten copper
