= Argos Pelasgikon =

Homeric location of Thessaly

Argos Pelasgikon (Ancient Greek: Ἄργος Πελασγικόν) is a Homeric location of Thessaly mentioned in the "Catalogue of Ships" passage:

And with them were ranged thirty hollow ships. Now all those again that inhabited Pelasgian Argos, and dwelt in Alos and Alope and Trachis, and that held Phthia and Hellas, the land of fair women, and were called Myrmidons and Hellenes and Achaeans; of the fifty ships of these men was Achilles captain.

It has been interpreted to be a city in the Pelasgiotis district or an alternative name of Phthia, the kingdom of Peleus and Achilles or pertaining to the whole Thessaly. Strabo reports that: Some take the Pelasgian Argos as a Thessalian city once situated in the neighborhood of Larisa but now no longer existent; but others take it, not as a city, but as the plain of the Thessalians, which is referred to by this name because Abas, who brought a colony there from Argos, so named it. Strabo gives also the following post-classical meaning of the word 'argos': And in the more recent writers the plain, too, is called Argos, but not once in Homer. Yet they think that this is more especially a Macedonian or Thessalian usage.

Finally, although Homeric geography of Thessaly is not limited in this passage, the toponym "Thessalia" is absent in Homer. The unique element of the name is restricted to King Thessalus, son of Heracles, whose sons, Pheidippus and Antiphus appear as leaders from Dodecanesian insular kingdoms in the "Catalogue of Ships".
