= Alope (disambiguation) =

Alope (ancient Greek: Αλόπη) may refer to:

- Alope, a mythological figure
- Alope (spring), a spring and monument to Alope, the mythological figure
- Alope (Opuntian Locris), a town of ancient Locris
- Alope (Ozolian Locris), a town of ancient Locris
- Alope (Thessaly), a town of ancient Thessaly
- Alope, older name of Ephesus, an ancient city in Asia Minor
- Alope, older name of Lycia, a historical region in Asia Minor
- Alope (crustacean), a shrimp genus in the family Hippolytidae
