= Eurytion (king of Phthia) =

In Greek mythology, Eurytion (/jʊəˈrɪʃən/; Ancient Greek: Εὐρυτίων; gen.: Εὐρυτίωνος, romanized: Eurytiôn, lit. 'widely honoured') or Eurythion (/jʊəˈrɪθiən/; Ancient Greek: Εὐρυθίων) was a king of Phthia. He was also counted among the Argonauts and the Calydonian hunters. The writer Tzetzes called Eurytion as Eurytus.

== Family ==
Eurytion was the swift son of either of Irus and Demonassa, or of Kenethos and Cerion, and father of Antigone. His father was also called Actor, king of Phthia who otherwise known as his grandfather for Irus was the son of Actor. If Eurytion's father was Irus, he was the brother of Eurydamas, also an Argonaut.

Comparative table of Eurytus' family and fate
Relation	Names	Sources					
Relation	Names	Apollonius	Apollodorus	Hyginus	Antoninus	Orphic	Unknown
Parentage	Irus	✓			✓	✓	
Parentage	Irus and Demonassa			✓			
Parentage	Actor		✓				
Parentage	Kenethos and Cerion						✓
Brother	Eurydamas			✓			
Children	Antigone		✓	✓			
Death by Peleus		X	✓	?	✓	?	?

== Mythology ==
When Peleus fled away from Aegina because of the murder of his half-brother Phocus, he was received and purified by Eurytion at his Phthian court. In addition, the king also offered the son of Aeacus a third part of the kingdom to rule over and his daughter Antigone to marry.

In the times when the voyage of the Argonauts took place, Eurytion was known to let his hair grew until he was safe at home again. Together with his son-in-law, he also goes to Calydon to answer the call from King Oeneus to kill the Calydonian Boar which ravaged the said country. There, along with the other hunters, they were hospitably entertained by the king for ten days and during the hunt, Peleus forcefully thrown a spear that missed the giant wild hog but inadvertently struck his father-in-law. Eurytion died in the woods caused by that deadly wound in his chest while Peleus then fled from Phthia to Iolcus, where he was purified by King Acastus. Later on, the hero brought together many sheep and cattle and led them to Irus as blood money for the slaying of his son but Irus would not accept this price from Peleus and sent him away.
