= Irus (mythology) =

Greek mythological figure

In Greek mythology, Irus or Iros (/ɪrʌs/, Ancient Greek: Ἶρος, romanized: Íros, Ancient Greek pronunciation: ['i.ros]) may refer to two individuals:

- Irus, son of Actor and father of Eurytion and Eurydamas by Demonassa. When the hero Peleus brought together many sheep and cattle and led them to him as blood money for the slaying of his son, Eurytion, Irus would not accept this price and sent the hero away. As for Eurydamas, his father was called sometimes as Ctimenus from Dolopian Ctimene.
- Irus or Arnaeus, a character in The Odyssey.
