= Astydamia (wife of Acastus) =

Queen in Greek mythology

In Greek mythology, Astydamia (/əˌstɪdəˈmiːə/; Ancient Greek: Ἀστυδάμεια, romanized: Astudámeia, lit. 'tamer of the city'), also called Hippolyta and sometimes simply identified as Cretheis in a patronymic manner (Κρηθηίς, lit. 'the daughter of Cretheus'), is a princess and then queen of the ancient Greek city of Iolcus in Thessaly, the daughter of Cretheus and wife of Acastus. Astydamia fell in love with Peleus of Phthia and tried to seduce him during his short stay at Iolcus, but when her efforts failed she accused him of assault to her husband Acastus, an act that would make Peleus forever an enemy to the royal couple and their city.

== Family ==
Astydamia was the daughter of King Cretheus of Iolcus by one of his wives. Her (half-)siblings included Aeson, Pheres, Amythaon, Myrina and possibly Phalanna. She married Acastus, and was presumably the mother of his three daughters Sthenele, Laodamia and Sterope and his unnamed sons.

== Mythology ==
=== Classical sources ===
The earliest attestation of this episode is found in Pindar's fourth and fifth Nemean odes, written between 483 and 473 BC. Pindar writes in the fourth ode that Hippolyta's ‘crafty arts’ against Peleus, and Acastus’ attempt to kill him via animal ambush (which was only thwarted thanks to an intervention by the wise centaur Chiron) led to him waging a war against the city of Iolcus. He elaborates in the fifth ode that the deceitful queen Hippolyta reported a false story to her husband about Peleus supposedly making an attempt on her in Acastus' own bed, wishing to make Acastus a partner in her plot against Peleus, when the opposite was in fact true. Hippolyta had tried to seduce, begged and coaxed Peleus into becoming her illicit lover, but he had refused her advances again and again, evoking Zeus the god of hospitality in anger.

The story is further explained by a scholiast on those lines; the wife of Acastus, here called Cretheis, fell in love with Peleus, and tried to persuade him to sleep with her, but he would have none of that. In revenge, she lied to Acastus that Peleus had tried to rape her. After making up some excuse, Acastus led Peleus to some desolate area in Mount Pelion, where he intended to set wild animals upon Peleus while he left stealthily. But the gods pitied Peleus and his piousness, and sent Hephaestus to him, who gave him a large knife for Peleus to defend his life with. Some time later, Peleus would return to fight against Iolcus. In other authors, Hermes and Chiron arrived to give him a blade crafted by Hephaestus.

=== Later authors ===
The clearest and most detailed version of this story comes from Apollodorus, who calls the queen Astydamia. Astydamia married Acastus the heir of Pelias, until one day Peleus arrived at the court, seeking purification for his accidental murder of Eurytion during the hunt for the Calydonian Boar in Aetolia. Acastus gladly helped the remorseful man, but Astydamia grew deeply infatuated with Peleus, and tried to arrange meetings with him, even though both he and she were already married at the time. Peleus refused, and embittered by rejection Astydamia wrote a fraudulent letter to his wife Antigone in which she claimed that Peleus was about to marry Sterope, daughter of Acastus and princess of Iolcus; in despair, the broken-hearted Antigone hanged herself.

Furthermore, like in earlier versions Astydamia then went to Acastus and accused Peleus of attempting to stain her virtue. Acastus was not willing to directly kill the very man he had purified and was now hosting in his palace, so instead he hid Peleus' sword during a hunt and deserted him in the woods. Peleus would have perished to the attacking centaurs if it were not for Chiron's swift intervention.

Astydamia finally met her end many years later, when Peleus returned to conquer and sack Iolcus with the help of Jason and the Dioscuri. Peleus personally slew Astydamia, and cut her into pieces; he then marched the victorious army through her dismembered limbs. Scholia on Aristophanes' comic play The Clouds and several Attic ceramic pots also support the story.

== Background ==
The story of Astydamia follows a common folkloric structure, known primarily from the Biblical story of Joseph and Potiphar's wife, in which a wicked seductress fails to allure her object of desire and subsequently accuses him of sexual misconduct, whether attempt or assault. Similar stories in Greek myth include Phaedra with Hippolytus, Cleoboea with Antheus, and Stheneboea with Bellerophon. The archetype is also found in tales from India and China.

Astydamia being cut in pieces and then having the army march between her into the city perhaps indicates more than mere vengeance; it might have been a ritual of sacrifice or purification, in order to keep the army safe when among hostile enemies. Some ancient Greek states such as Boeotia and Macedonia had rites in which a dog was cut in two and the pieces placed left and right on the road so one might walk between them. Another example is of an old Algerian pirate custom to cut a sheep while at peril in the sea, extract its entrails, separate the body in two parts and toss both halves into the sea, each from opposite sides of the ship.

== See also ==
Other tales of rejected women accusing the men in question of assault:

- Tenes and Philonome
- Eunostus and Ochne
- Phoenix and Phthia

== Bibliography ==
- Apollodorus, Apollodorus, The Library, with an English Translation by Sir James George Frazer, F.B.A., F.R.S. in 2 Volumes. Cambridge, MA, Harvard University Press; London, William Heinemann Ltd. 1921. Includes Frazer's notes. Online version at Perseus.tufts Project.
- Bell, Robert E. (1991). Women of Classical Mythology: A Biographical Dictionary. ABC-Clio. ISBN 9780874365818.
- Gantz, Timothy (1993). Early Greek Myth: A Guide to Literary and Artistic Sources. Vol. 1. Johns Hopkins University Press. ISBN 978-0-8018-5360-9.
- Grimal, Pierre (1987). The Dictionary of Classical Mythology. Wiley-Blackwell. ISBN 0-631-13209-0.
- Homer, The Odyssey with an English Translation by A.T. Murray, Ph.D. in two volumes. Cambridge, MA., Harvard University Press; London, William Heinemann, Ltd. 1919. Online text available at Perseus.tufts project.
- March, Jennifer R. (May 31, 2014). Dictionary of Classical Mythology. Oxbow Books. ISBN 978-1-78297-635-6.
- Pindar, Nemean Odes in Odes, with an English translation and notes by Diane Arnson Svarlien. Yale University Press. 1990. Text available online at Perseus.tufts Project.
- Plutarch, Moralia, Volume IV: Roman Questions. Greek Questions. Greek and Roman Parallel Stories. On the Fortune of the Romans. On the Fortune or the Virtue of Alexander. Were the Athenians More Famous in War or in Wisdom? Translated by Frank Cole Babbitt. Loeb Classical Library 305. Cambridge, MA: Harvard University Press, 1936.
- Rose, Herbert J. (2004). A Handbook of Greek Mythology (6th ed.). London, New York: Routledge. ISBN 0-415-04601-7.
- Rutherford, William Gunion (1896). Scholia Aristophanica. Vol. I. London, New York: Macmillan and Co.
- Scholia in Pindarum. Scholia Vetera in Pindari Carmina, Volume 3. Drachmann, A.B., editor. Leipzig: Teubner, 1927.
- Scholia vetera in Apollonium Rhodium from the Paris codex, volume II. Leipzig: Fleischer publications, 1813. Online text at google books.
- Smith, William (1873). A Dictionary of Greek and Roman Biography and Mythology. London, UK: John Murray, printed by Spottiswoode and Co. Online version at the Perseus.tufts library.
- Stephanus of Byzantium, Ethnica edited by August Meineike (1790–1870), published 1849. The Greek text in the public domain. A few entries from this important ancient handbook of place names have been translated by Brady Kiesling. Online text at ToposText.
- Trenkner, Sophie (1958). The Greek Novella in the Classical Period. Cambridge, UK: Cambridge University Press. ISBN 978-1-107-43825-5.
- Tripp, Edward (June 1970). Crowell's Handbook of Classical Mythology (1st ed.). Thomas Y. Crowell Co. ISBN 069022608X.
- Turner, Dawson William (1872). The Odes of Pindar: Literally Translated Into English Prose. Bell & Daldy.
- Tzetzes, John, Lycophronis Alexandra. Vol. II: Scholia Continens, edited by Eduard Scheer, Berlin, Weidmann, 1881. Internet Archive.
