= Ctimenus =

Greek myth: Ctimenus, father of Argonaut Eurydamas from Dolopian Ctimene

In Greek mythology, Ctimenus (Ancient Greek: Κτιμένου), from Dolopian Ctimene in Thessaly, was the father of the Argonaut Eurydamas. Otherwise, the latter was the son of Irus and Demonassa.
