= Dorium (mythology) =

In Greek mythology, Dorium or Dorion (Ancient Greek: Δωρίων, romanized: Dōríōn, lit. 'gift') was one of the 50 Danaïdes, daughters of Danaus, king of Libya (and later of Argos).

== Family ==
Dorion's mother was an Ethiopian woman and thus, sister to Pirene, Phartis, Mnestra, Evippe, Anaxibia and Nelo.

== Mythology ==
On the orders of her father, Dorium married and eventually murdered her cousin–husband Cercetes, son of King Aegyptus of Egypt by a Phoenician woman. Later on, because of the murder, she and her sisters — saved Hypermnestra — were punished in afterlife, being forced to carry a jug to fill a bathtub (pithos) without a bottom to wash their sins off. The water was always leaking that they would forever try to fill the tub.
