= Antigone (wife of Peleus) =

Character in Greek mythology

The Greek mythological character of Antigone (/ænˈtɪɡəni/ ann-TIG-ə-nee; Greek: Ἀντιγόνη), was a Phthian princess who was the daughter of Eurytion, and the wife of Peleus. The meaning of the name is, as in the case of the masculine equivalent Antigonus, "worthy of one's parents" or "in place of one's parents".

== Mythology ==
Peleus was the son of Aeacus, king of the island of Aegina. Peleus and his brother Telamon killed their half-brother Phocus, possibly accidentally. To escape punishment they fled from Aegina. At Phthia, Peleus was purified by Eurytion, king of Phthia, and married Eurytion's daughter, Antigone. Peleus and Antigone had a daughter, Polydora who became the mother of Menesthius by the river god Spercheus.

During the hunt for the Calydonian Boar, Peleus accidentally killed Eurytion and fled Phthia. Arriving in Iolcus, Peleus was purified of the murder of Eurytion by Acastus, the king of Iolcus.

Acastus' wife, Astydamia, made amorous advances to Peleus, which he rejected. Bitter, she sent a message to Antigone falsely accusing Peleus of infidelity, whereupon Antigone hanged herself.
