= Mnestra (mythology) =

In Greek mythology, Mnestra (Ancient Greek: Μνήστρα) may refer to the following women:

- Mnestra, possibly the accurate name of Monuste, one of the 50 Danaids as a daughter of King Danaus of Libya (and later Argos) by an Ethiopian woman. She was the sister of Pirene, Dorion, Phartis, Evippe, Anaxibia and Nelo. Mnestra married and eventually murdered her cousin Aegius, son of Aegyptus by a Phoenician woman, following the orders of her father Danaus. If she was known as Monuste, her groom was instead called Eurysthenes.
- Mnestra, modern version of the name Mestra, the shapeshifting daughter of Erysichthon.
