= Ctimene (Thessaly) =

Town and polis in ancient Thessaly

Coordinates: 39°03′59″N 21°59′01″E

Map showing ancient Thessaly. Ctimene is shown in the lower left in Dolopia.

Ctimene or Ktimene (Ancient Greek: Κτιμένη), was a town and polis in ancient Thessaly, on the borders of Dolopia and Phthia, near the Lake Xynias. It is cited by Apollonius of Rhodes as the place of origin of one of the argonauts, Eurydamas, and relates it to the tribe of the Dolopes.

Livy relates that the retreat of Philip V of Macedon after the Battle of the Aous (198 BC) allowed the Aetolians to occupy much of Thessaly, and these latter devastated the town called Cymene and its neighbour, Angeia. William Smith treats the reference to Cymene as a probable corruption of Ctimene. Stephanus of Byzantium mentions a tradition that Ctimene had been given by Peleus to Phoenix. The editors of the Barrington Atlas of the Greek and Roman World identify the site of Ctimene with the modern village of Rentina, which is tentative accepted by others.
