= Polyidus (disambiguation) =

Polyidus (Ancient Greek: Πολύειδος, Πολύϊδος) may refer to:

- Polyidus, a Corinthian seer of Greek mythology
- Polyidus (poet), a Greek poet and painter of the fifth century B.C.
- Polyidus of Thessaly, a Greek engineer of the fourth-century B.C.
- two other characters as detailed in Polyidus (mythology)
