= Dolopia =

Dolopia Δολοπία
- Region of Ancient Greece
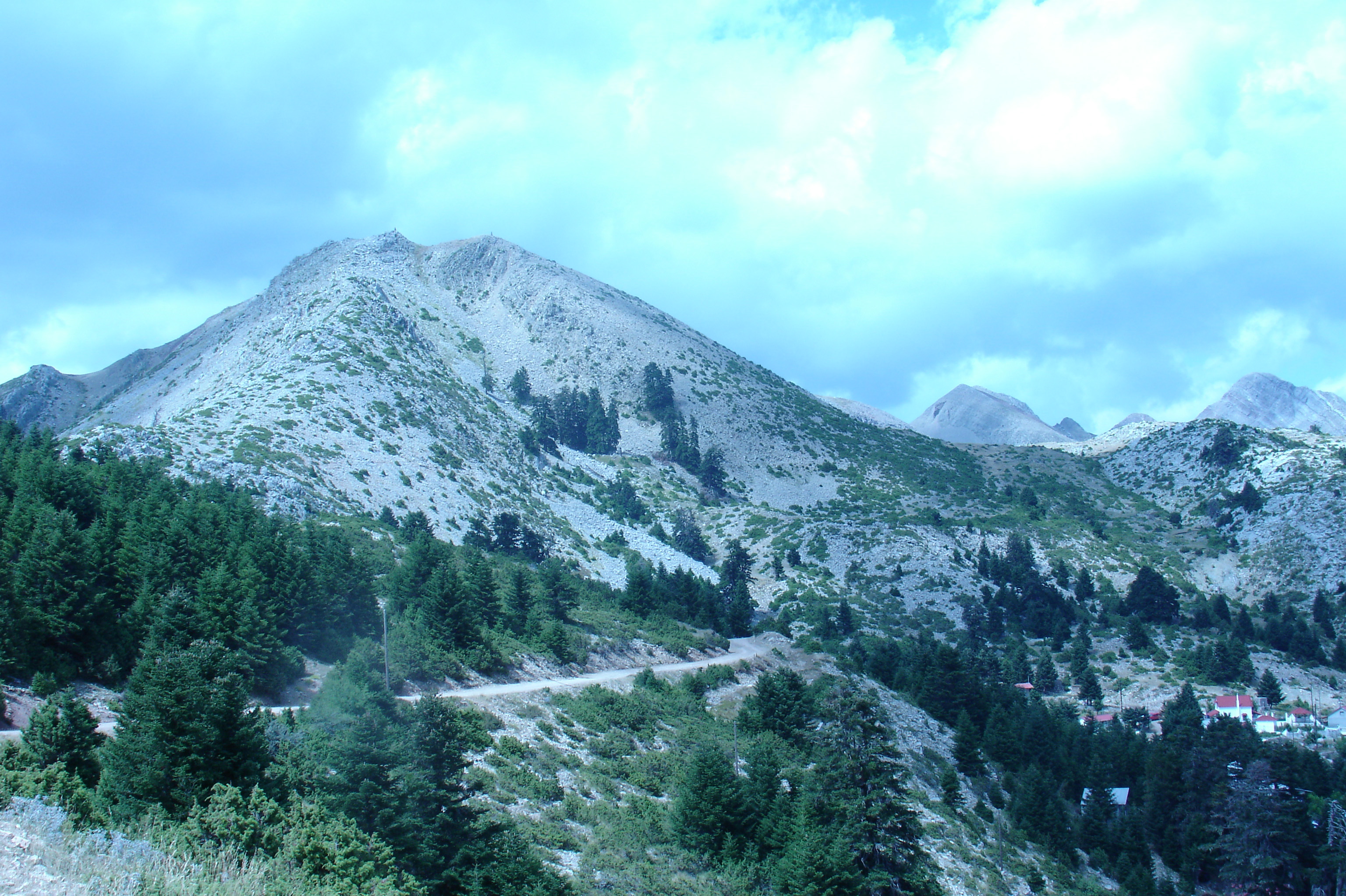
- Now Evrytania

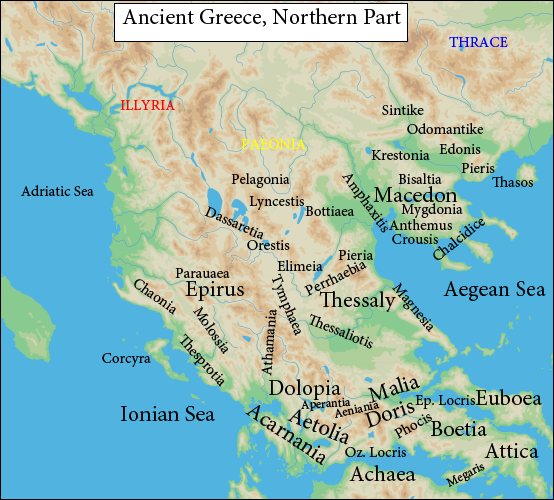
- Map of ancient Dolopia & environs
- Location: Western Greece
- Dialects: Doric

Dolopia (Ancient Greek: Δολοπία) is a mountainous region of Greece, located north of Aetolia.

== Geography ==
Dolopia was located between Epirus and Thessaly, eventually absorbed into the latter. It was a mountainous district in the southwestern corner of Thessaly, lying between Mount Tymphrestus, a branch of Pindus, on the one side, and Mount Othrys on the other. The Dolopes were, like the Magnetes, an ancient Hellenic people, and members of the Amphictyonic League. They are mentioned by Homer as included in Phthia, but were governed by a subordinate chieftain of their own. Though nominally belonging to Thessaly, they seem practically to have been independent: and their country was at a later period a constant subject of contention between the Aetolians and the kings of Macedonia. The only place in Dolopia of the slightest importance was Ctimene. Other of their cities were, Angeia and Dolopeis, close to lake Xynius.

== Mythology and history ==
According to Stephanus of Byzantium, the Dolopes (Greek: Δόλοπες) were named after a certain Dolops. They were considered Thessalians, or sometimes Aetolians. During the Trojan War, they were ruled by Phoenix, son of Amyntor. He had been installed by King Peleus of Phthia as a vassal. When the Achaean ships were gathering at Aulis, the Dolopes who inhabited the island of Skyros rebelled against Peleus' rule. He sent his son Achilles to put down the revolt. When Achilles went to fight at Troy, Phoenix was sent to counsel him. According to Pindar, the Dolopes led by Phoenix at Troy were known for their use of slings.

Dolopians were either under Thessalian rule, or autonomous and members of the Amphictyonic league. In 480 BC they joined the Persian marching army. In 420 BC they warred against Heraclea in Trachis in alliance with Thessalians and Aenianians. In the 4th century BC they allied themselves with the Corinthian league under Philip II.

== List of Dolopians ==
- Crantor, a squire given to Peleus after a Dolopian defeat.
- Deidamia, princess of Skyros and mother of Neoptolemus.
- Eurydamas, son of Ctimenus and member of the Argonauts.
- Lycomedes, father of Deidamia and king of the Dolopians on Skyros.
- Phoenix, son of Amyntor and king of the Dolopians in the Iliad.

== See also ==
- Eurytanes
- Acarnania
- List of traditional Greek place names
- Aetolia
