= Angeia =

Town and polis (city-state) in ancient Thessaly

Coordinates: 39°07′18″N 22°02′15″E

Angeia or Angea (Ancient Greek: Ἀγγεία) was a town and polis (city-state) in ancient Thessaly in the district Dolopia. Livy relates that the retreat of Philip V of Macedon after the Battle of the Aous (198 BC) allowed the Aetolians to occupy much of Thessaly, and these latter devastated Angeia and its neighbour, Ctimene. Modern scholars identify the site of Angeia with the modern village of Loutropigi.
