= Rentina, Karditsa =

Village in Thessaly, Greece

Rentina Ρεντίνα
- Municipal unit
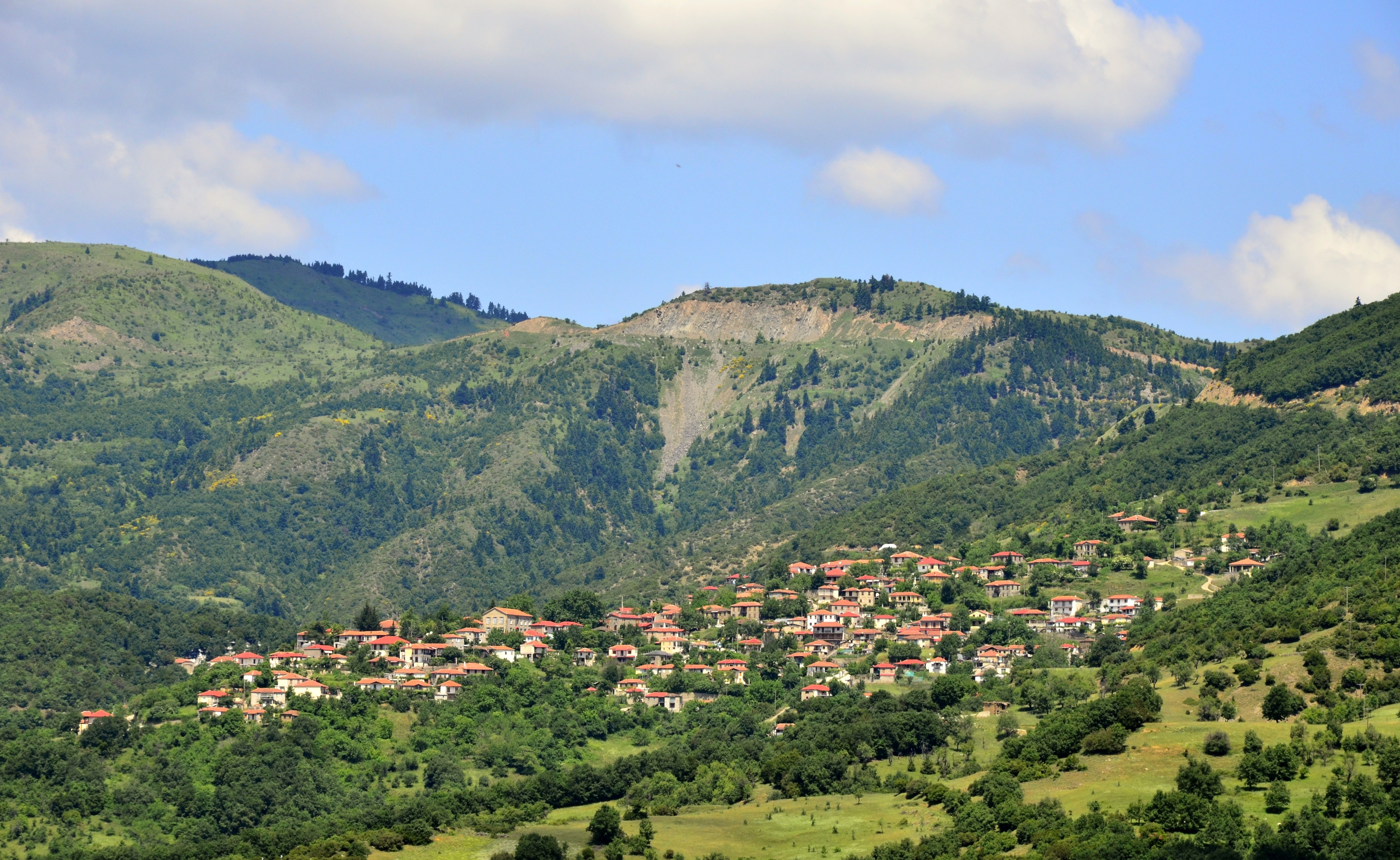

- Location within the regional unit

- Location within Greece
- Coordinates: 39°04′N 22°00′E
- Country: Greece
- Administrative region: Thessaly
- Regional unit: Karditsa
- Municipality: Sofades

Area
  - Municipal unit: 57.0 km^{2} (22.0 sq mi)

Population (2021)
  - Municipal unit: 261
  - Municipal unit density: 4.58/km^{2} (11.9/sq mi)
- Time zone: UTC+2 (EET)
  - Summer (DST): UTC+3 (EEST)
- Vehicle registration: ΚΑ

Rentina (Greek: Ρεντίνα) is a village and a former municipality in the Karditsa regional unit, Thessaly, Greece. Since the 2011 local government reform it is part of the municipality Sofades, of which it is a municipal unit. The municipal unit has an area of 56.968 km^{2}. Population 261 (2021). The village has been identified as the site of the ancient city of Ctimene.

Rentina is the birthplace of Greek Prime Minister Georgios Tsolakoglou (1886-1948).
