= Menemachus (mythology) =

Son of Aegyptus

In Greek mythology, Menemachus (Ancient Greek: Μενέμαχος, romanized: Menemachos, lit. 'enduring in battle' or 'steadfast in war') was an Egyptian prince as one of the sons of King Aegyptus.

== Family ==
Menemachus's mother was a Phoenician woman and thus full brother of Agaptolemus, Cercetes, Eurydamas, Argius, Aegius and Archelaus. In some accounts, he could be a son of Aegyptus either by Eurryroe, daughter of the river-god Nilus, or Isaie, daughter of King Agenor of Tyre.

== Mythology ==
Menemachus suffered the same fate as his other brothers, save Lynceus, when they were slain on their wedding night by their wives who obeyed the command of their father King Danaus of Libya. He married the Danaid Nelo, daughter of Danaus and an Ethiopian woman.
