= Acastus =

Ancient Greek mythological Argonaut

- King of Iolcus
- Member of the Deucalionids
- Predecessor: Pelias
- Abode: Iolcus

Genealogy
- Parents: Pelias and Anaxibia or Philomache
- Siblings: Pisidice, Alcestis, Pelopia, Hippothoe, Amphinome, Evadne, Asteropeia, and Antinoe
- Consort: Astydamia or Hippolyte
- Offspring: Sterope, Laodamia, Sthenele, Arxippus

Acastus (/əˈkæstəs/; Ancient Greek: Ἄκαστος, romanized: Ákastos, lit. 'to heal' or 'quiet and peaceful') is a character in Greek mythology. He sailed with Jason and the Argonauts, and participated in the hunt for the Calydonian Boar.

== Family ==
Acastus was the son of Pelias, then king of Iolcus, and Anaxibia (Philomache in some traditions). Acastus with his wife Astydamia (also called Hippolyte, daughter of Cretheus) had two daughters: Sterope and Laodamia, and a number of sons. Another daughter, Sthenele, was given by the Bibliotheca as the wife of Menoetius and mother of Patroclus.

== Mythology ==
After the return of the Argonauts, Acastus's sisters were manipulated by Medea to cut their father Pelias in pieces and boil them. Acastus, when he heard this, buried his father, and drove Jason and Medea from Iolcus (and, according to Pausanias, his sisters also), and instituted funeral games in honor of his father. He thereafter became king of Iolcus.

Acastus purified Peleus of the murder of King Eurytion of Phthia. Acastus's wife (variously named in mythology; often Astydamia, but sometimes Hippolyte, daughter of Cretheus) fell in love with Peleus but he scorned her. Bitter, she sent a messenger to Antigone, Peleus's wife and daughter of Eurytion, to tell her that Peleus was to marry Acastus's daughter, Sterope.

Astydamia then told Acastus that Peleus had tried to rape her. Acastus took Peleus on a hunting trip and hid his sword while he slept, then abandoned him on Mt. Pelion to be killed by centaurs. The wise centaur Chiron (or the god Hermes) returned Peleus' sword and Peleus managed to escape. With Jason and the Dioscuri, Peleus sacked Iolcus, dismembered Astydamia (and, in some accounts, Acastus himself), and marched his army between the pieces. Their kingdom later fell to Jason's son Thessalus.
