= Laodamia (daughter of Acastus) =

Greek mythological figure

In Greek mythology, Laodamia (Ancient Greek: Λαοδάμεια, romanized: Laodámeia, lit. 'tamer of the people') was the daughter of Acastus, king of Iolcus, possibly by his wife Astydamia. Laodamia became the wife of Protesilaus.

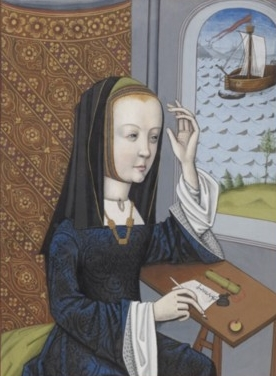
Paint Illustration of Laodamia

== Mythology ==
After Protesilaus was killed in the Trojan War he was allowed to return to his wife for only three hours before returning to the underworld because they had only just married. Thereafter Laodamia was described as possibly having committed suicide by stabbing herself, rather than be without him.

According to Hyginus' Fabulae, however, the story runs like this: "When Laodamia, daughter of Acastus, after her husband's loss had spent the three hours which she had asked from the gods, she could not endure her weeping and grief. And so she made a bronze likeness of her husband Protesilaus, put it in her room under pretense of sacred rites, and devoted herself to it. When a servant early in the morning had brought fruit for the offerings, he looked through a crack in the door and saw her holding the image of Protesilaus in her embrace and kissing it. Thinking she had a lover he told her father Acastus. When he came and burst into the room, he saw the statue of Protesilaus. To put an end to her torture he had the statue and the sacred offerings burned on a pyre he had made, but Laodamia, not enduring her grief, threw herself on it and was burned to death."

In Book VI of the Roman poet Virgil's Aeneid, Laodamia is one of the inhabitants of the "Mourning Fields" (Lugentes Campi), a region of the underworld visited by Aeneas.

== See also ==
- Phene
- Olenus
