= Alope (Ozolian Locris) =

Alope (Ancient Greek: Ἀλόπη, romanized: Alópē) was a town of the Ozolian Locrians of uncertain site. Its exact location is not known with certainty. Strabo only locates it in Ozolian Locris and distinguishes it from two other towns with the same name, one in the area of the Opuntian Locris and another in Achaea Phthiotis. He adds that this city was a colony of the one in Opuntian Locris.

Thucydides writes that during the Peloponnesian War, in the year 426 BCE, the Alopians, along with other cities of the Ozolian Locris had to provide hostages to the Spartans. It has been suggested that the name of Olopians may have been an error and in fact it would have referred to the Alpians, which would be the inhabitants of a city that was named Alpa. The editors of the Barrington Atlas of the Greek and Roman World tentatively place Alope with a site called "Kokovista" in the modern village of Makrini.
