= Aegius =

In Greek mythology, Aegius (Ancient Greek: Αἴγιος) was an Egyptian prince as one of the sons of King Aegyptus.

== Family ==
Aegius's mother was a Phoenician woman and thus full brother of Agaptolemus, Cercetes, Eurydamas, Argius, Archelaus and Menemachus. In some accounts, he could be a son of Aegyptus either by Eurryroe, daughter of the river-god Nilus, or Isaie, daughter of King Agenor of Tyre.

== Mythology ==
Aegius suffered the same fate as his other brothers, save Lynceus, when they were slain on their wedding night by their wives who obeyed the command of their father King Danaus of Libya. He married the Danaid Mnestra, daughter of Danaus and an Ethiopian woman.
