= Eurydamas =

Set index of mythological characters

In Greek mythology, the name Eurydamas /jʊˈrɪdəməs/ (Ancient Greek: Εὐρυδάμᾱς) may refer to:

- Eurydamas, an Egyptian prince as one of the sons of King Aegyptus. His mother was a Phoenician woman and thus full brother of Agaptolemus, Cercetes, Aegius, Argius, Archelaus and Menemachus. In some accounts, he could be a son of Aegyptus either by Eurryroe, daughter of the river-god Nilus, or Isaie, daughter of King Agenor of Tyre. Eurydamas suffered the same fate as his other brothers, save Lynceus, when they were slain on their wedding night by their wives who obeyed the command of their father King Danaus of Libya. He married the Danaid Phartis, daughter of Danaus and an Ethiopian woman.
- Eurydamas, one of the Argonauts, son of either of Ctimenus or Irus and Demonassa, if indeed in the latter case he is not being confounded with Eurytion who could also be his brother. Eurydamas was from Ctimene in Thessaly.
- Eurydamas, son of Pelias (not the same as Pelias of Iolcus). He fought in the Trojan War and was one of those who hid in the Trojan Horse.
- Eurydamas, an elder of Troy, interpreter of dreams. His sons Abas and Polyidus were killed by Diomedes.
- Eurydamas, son-in-law of Antenor. Was killed by Diomedes.
- Eurydamas, one of the suitors of Penelope, who gave her as a present a pair of earrings, and was eventually killed by Odysseus.
