= Cercetes =

Son of Aegyptus in Greek mythology

In Greek mythology, Cercetes (Ancient Greek: Κερκέτης, romanized: Kerkētēs) was an Egyptian prince as one of the sons of King Aegyptus.

== Name ==
The form Κερκέτης was put forward by Richard Wagner. Other spellings, which Wilhelm Capelle deems incorrect, include: κέρκηστις, found in certain manuscripts; κερκήστης, used by Christian Gottlob Heyne; and κερκέστης, mentioned by Wilhelm Heinrich Roscher.

== Family ==
In the Bibliotheca, a 1st- or 2nd-century AD mythological compendium by the mythographer Apollodorus, Cercetes' mother was a Phoenician woman and thus, brother to Agaptolemus, Eurydamas, Aegius, Argius, Archelaus and Menemachus. He married Dorion, one of the fifty Danaïdes, daughters of the Libyan king Danaus.

== Mythology ==
Cercetes suffered the same fate as his other brothers, save Lynceus, when they were slain on their wedding night by their wives who obeyed the command of their father King Danaus of Libya.
