= Polyidus (mythology) =

In Greek mythology, Polyidus (/ˌpɒliˈaɪdəs/; Ancient Greek: Πολύειδος Polúeidos means 'seeing many things') may refer to three distinct characters. The name also means "much beauty", from polus, "many, much" and eidos, "form, appearance, beauty".

- Polyidus, a Corinthian seer and descendant of Melampus.
- Polyidus, the Trojan son of Eurydamas and brother of Abas. He was a reader of dreams and an old man at the time of the Trojan War. Polyidus was killed by the Argive hero Diomedes.
- Polyidus, one of the Suitors of Penelope who came from Dulichium along with other 56 wooers. He, with the other suitors, was shot dead by Odysseus with the help of Eumaeus, Philoetius, and Telemachus.
