= Argeus (mythology) =

In Greek mythology, Argeus (Ancient Greek: Ἀργεύς, romanized: Argeús, lit. 'the hunter') or Argius (Ancient Greek: Ἀργεῖος, romanized: Argeios) or may refer to the following personages:

- Argeius or Argus, a king of Argos around 1600 BCE, and successor to Apis, king of Argos, according to Tatian.
- Argius, an Egyptian prince as one of the sons of King Aegyptus. His mother was a Phoenician woman and thus full brother of Agaptolemus, Cercetes, Aegius, Aegius, Archelaus and Menemachus. In some accounts, he could be a son of Aegyptus either by Eurryroe, daughter of the river-god Nilus, or Isaie, daughter of King Agenor of Tyre. Eurydamas suffered the same fate as his other brothers, save Lynceus, when they were slain on their wedding night by their wives who obeyed the command of their father King Danaus of Libya. He married the Danaid Evippe, daughter of Danaus either and an Ethiopian woman.
- Argeus, one of the sons (in a rare version of the myth) of Phineus and Danaë, the other being Argus.
- Argeus, a king of Argos
- Argeius, a Theban prince as one of the Niobids, children of Queen Niobe and King Amphion.
- Argeios, an Elean prince as son of King Pelops and Hippodamia. He went to Amyclae and married King Amyclas's daughter, Hegesandra and became the father of three sons: Melanion, Alector and Boethoos.
- Argeus, son of Licymnius and brother of Melas. He fell in battle fighting with Heracles against King Eurytus of Oechalia, a city of doubtful location.
- Argeius, a centaur who was driven mad by the smell of wine and subsequently killed by the demigod Heracles while the latter was visiting his friend, the centaur Pholus, some time between his third and fourth labors.
- Argeius, a (probably mythical) youth who competed at the ancient Nemean Games and Isthmian Games, recorded in the poems of Bacchylides.
- Argius, one of the Suitors of Penelope who came from Dulichium along with either 56 other wooers (according to Apollodorus), or 51 (according to Homer). He, with the other suitors, was killed by Odysseus with the help of Eumaeus, Philoetius, and Telemachus.
- Argeus, son of Deiphontes, king of Argos, by his wife Hyrnetho.
- Argeus, a surname of Pan and Aristaeus
