= Alope (Thessaly) =

Town of Phthiotis in Ancient Thessaly

Coordinates: 38°52′51″N 22°47′20″E

Map showing ancient Thessaly. Alope is shown to the bottom right opposite Euboea (shown in pink).

Alope (Ancient Greek: Ἀλόπη, romanized: Alópē) was a town of Phthiotis in Ancient Thessaly, placed by Stephanus of Byzantium between Larissa Cremaste and Echinus. There was a dispute among the ancient critics whether this town was the same as the Alope in Homer's Catalog of Ships. Strabo distinguishes the town from two others of the same name, Alope in the area of Opuntian Locris and Alope in that of Ozolian Locris. The editors of the Barrington Atlas of the Greek and Roman World tentatively locate Alope with the modern village of Fournoi in the municipality of Echinaioi.
