= Peleus =

Mythical character

- King of Phthia
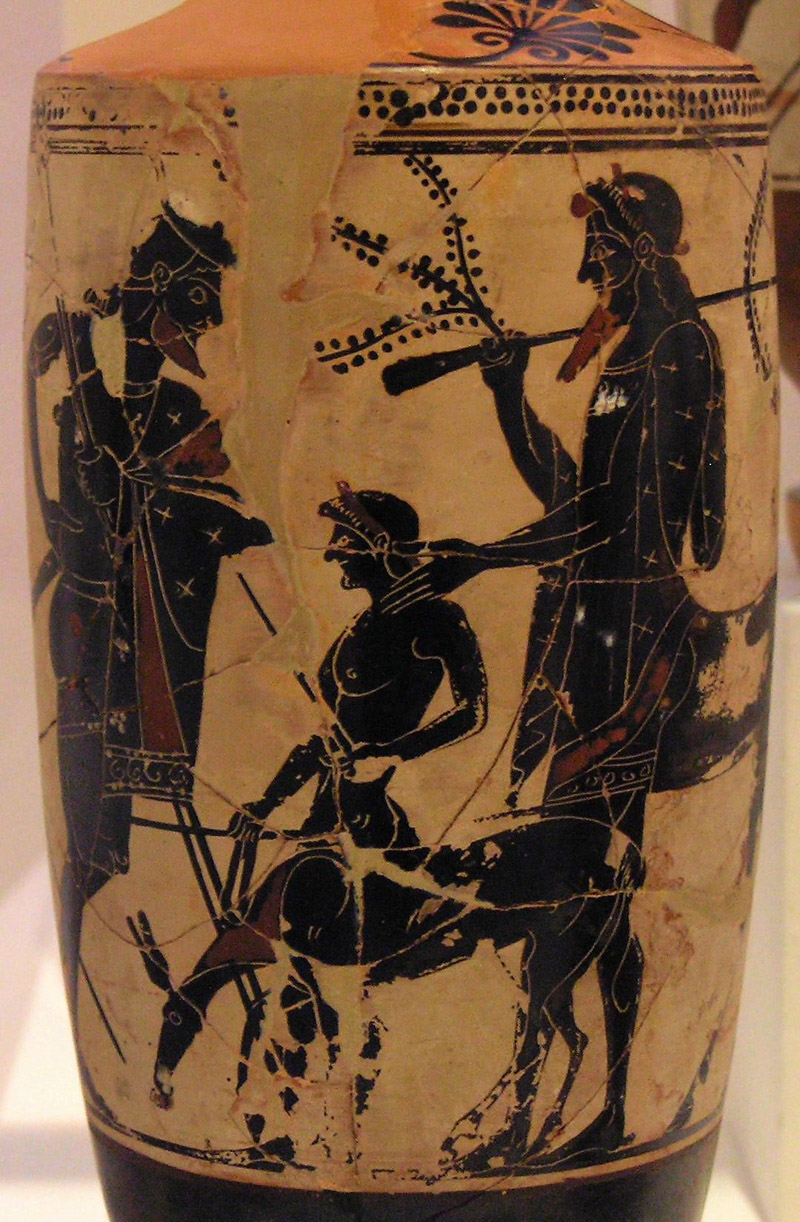
- Peleus consigns Achilles to Chiron's care, white-ground lekythos by the Edinburgh Painter, c. 500 BC (National Archaeological Museum of Athens).
- Abode: Phthia

Genealogy
- Parents: Aeacus and Endeis
- Siblings: Telamon, Phocus
- Consort: Thetis
- Offspring: Achilles, Polymele

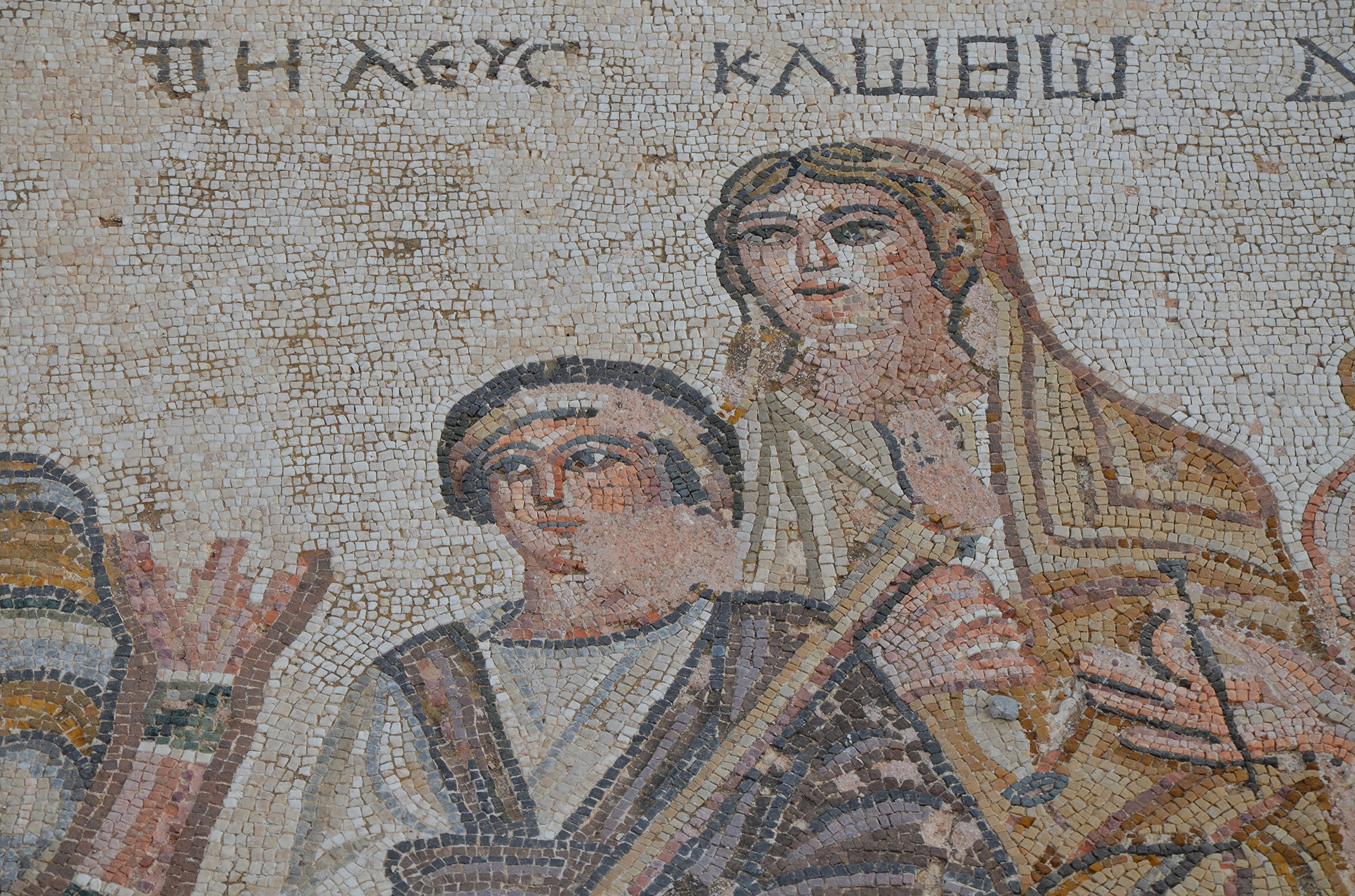
Detail of Greek mosaic with Peleus and Clotho, Paphos Archaeological Park

In Greek mythology, Peleus (/ˈpiːliəs, ˈpiːljuːs/; Ancient Greek: Πηλεύς, romanized: Pēleús) was a hero, king of Phthia, husband of Thetis and the father of their son Achilles. This myth was already known to the hearers of Homer in the late 8th century BC.

== Biography ==
Peleus was the son of Aeacus, king of the island of Aegina, and Endeïs, the oread of Mount Pelion in Thessaly. He married the sea-nymph Thetis with whom he fathered Achilles.

Polymele, a daughter of Peleus, was one of the possible mothers of Patroclus by Menoetius.

Peleus and his brother Telamon were friends of Jason and both were counted as Argonauts. Though there were no further kings in Aegina, the kings of Epirus claimed descent from Peleus in the historic period.

== Mythology ==
Peleus and his brother Telamon killed their half-brother Phocus, perhaps in a hunting accident and certainly in an unthinking moment, and fled Aegina to escape punishment. In Phthia, Peleus was purified by the city's ruler, Eurytion, and then married the latter's daughter, Antigone, by whom he had a daughter, Polydora. Eurytion received the barest mention among the Argonauts (both Peleus and Telamon joined the Argonauts themselves, "yet not together, nor from one place, for they dwelt far apart and distant from Aigina"). However, Peleus accidentally killed Eurytion during the hunt for the Calydonian boar and fled from Phthia.

Peleus was purified of the murder of Eurytion in Iolcus by Acastus. Acastus's wife, Astydamia (also called Hippolyta or Cretheis), fell in love with Peleus and after he scorned her, she sent a messenger to Antigone to tell her that Peleus was to marry Acastus's daughter. As a result, Antigone hanged herself.

Astydamia then told Acastus that Peleus had tried to rape her. Acastus took Peleus on a hunting trip atop Mount Pelion and once Peleus fell asleep, Acastus hid his sword in cow dung and abandoned him on the mountainside. Peleus woke up and as a group of centaurs was about to attack him, the wise centaur Chiron, or, according to another source, Hermes, returned his sword to him and Peleus managed to escape. Alternatively the gods appreciated his piousness and sent Hephaestus to him, who gave him a sword. He pillaged Iolcus and dismembered Astydamia, then marched his army between the rended limbs. Acastus and Astydamia were dead and the kingdom fell to Jason's son, Thessalus.

=== Marriage to Thetis ===
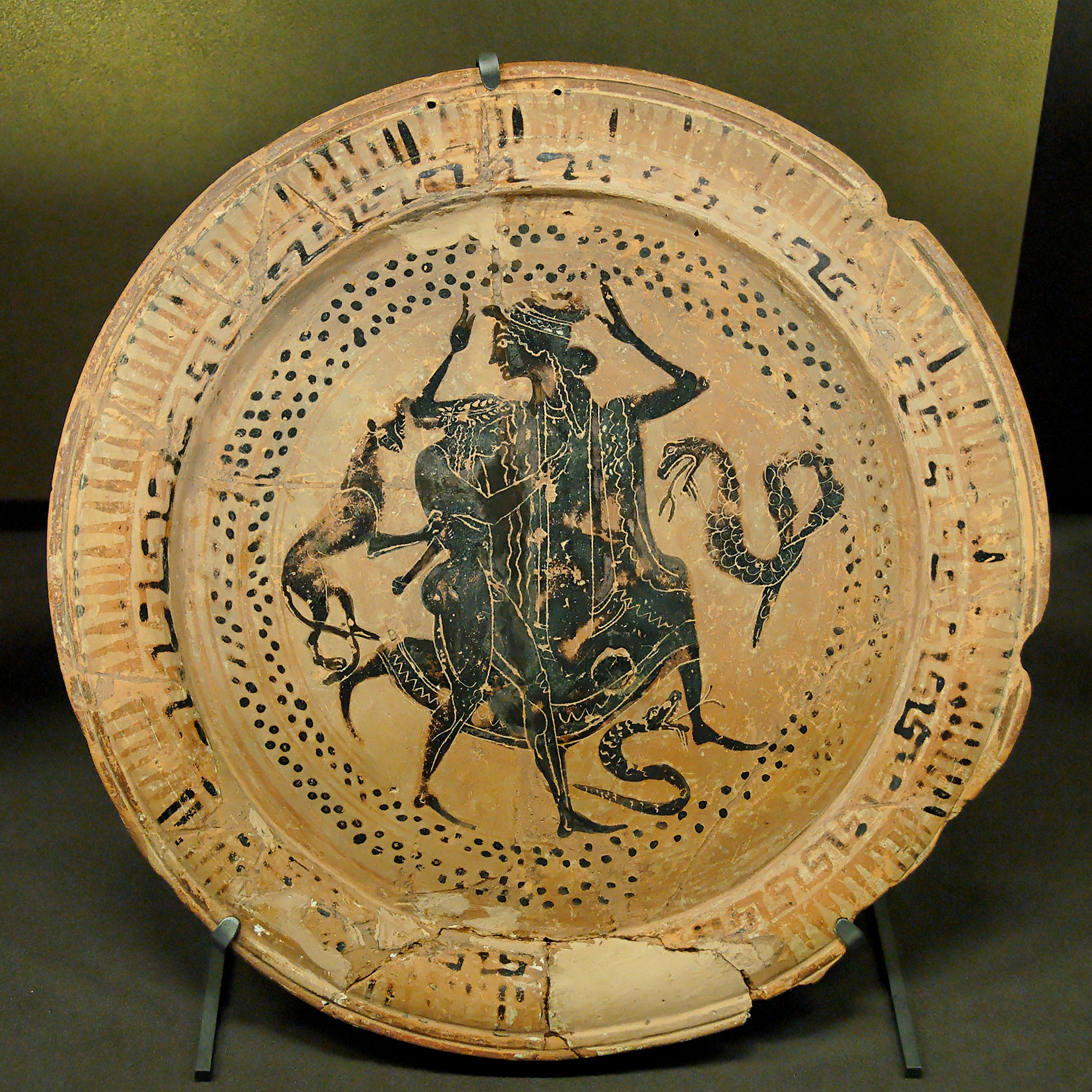
Peleus makes off with his prize bride Thetis, who has vainly assumed animal forms to escape him: Boeotian black-figure dish, c. 500 BC–475 BC

After Antigone's death, Peleus married the sea-nymph Thetis. He was able to win her over with the aid of Proteus, who instructed Peleus to hold onto her tightly through all of her physical transformations she used to try to escape. Their wedding feast was attended by many of the Olympian gods. As wedding presents, Poseidon gave Peleus two immortal horses: Balius and Xanthus, Hephaestus gave him a knife, Aphrodite a bowl with an embossed Eros, Hera a chlamys, Athena a flute, Nereus a basket of the divine salt which has an irresistible virtue for overeating, appetite and digestion and Zeus gave Thetis, as present, the wings of Arke.

During the feast, Eris, in revenge for not being invited, produced the apple of Discord, which started the quarrel that led to the judgement of Paris and eventually the Trojan War. The marriage of Peleus and Thetis produced seven sons, six of whom died in infancy. The only surviving son was Achilles.

=== Rescue of Achilles ===
Thetis attempted to render her son Achilles invulnerable. In the well-known version, she dipped him in the River Styx, holding him by one heel, which remained vulnerable. In an early and less popular version of the story, Thetis anointed the boy in ambrosia and put him on top of a fire to burn away the mortal parts of his body. She was interrupted by Peleus and she abandoned both father and son in a rage, leaving his heel vulnerable.

A nearly identical story is told by Plutarch, in his On Isis and Osiris, of the goddess Isis burning away the mortality of Prince Maneros of Byblos, son of Queen Astarte, and being likewise interrupted before completing the process. Later on in life, Achilles is killed by Paris when he is shot in his vulnerable spot, the heel. This is the source of the term "Achilles' heel".

Peleus gave Achilles to the centaur Chiron, to raise on Mt. Pelion, which took its name from Peleus. In the Iliad, Achilles uses Peleus's immortal horses and also wields his father's spear.

When the Dolopes on Skyros revolted against Peleus' rule, he sent Achilles to take back the island. In one source, it was Peleus who sent Achilles to hide on Skyros instead of Thetis, knowing their son was fated to die in the Trojan War.

== In hero-cult ==
Though the tomb of Aeacus remained in a shrine enclosure in the most conspicuous part of the port city, a quadrangular enclosure of white marble sculpted with bas-reliefs, in the form in which Pausanias saw it, with the tumulus of Phocus nearby, there was no temenos of Peleus at Aegina. Two versions of Peleus's fate account for this; in Euripides's Troades, Acastus, son of Pelias, has exiled him from Phthia; and subsequently he dies in exile; in another, he is reunited with Thetis and made immortal.

In antiquity, according to a fragment of Callimachus's lost Aitia, there was a tomb of Peleus in Ikos (modern Alonissos), an island of the northern Sporades; there Peleus was venerated as "king of the Myrmidons" and the "return of the hero" was celebrated annually. And there was his tomb, according to a poem in the Greek Anthology.

The only other reference to veneration of Peleus comes from the Christian Clement of Alexandria, in his polemical Exhortation to the Greeks. Clement attributes his source to a "collection of marvels" by a certain "Monimos" of whom nothing is known, and claims, in pursuit of his thesis that daimon-worshipers become as cruel as their gods, that in "Pella of Thessaly human sacrifice is offered to Peleus and Cheiron, the victim being an Achaean". Of this, the continuing association of Peleus and Chiron is the most dependable detail.

== In Athenian tragedy ==
A Peleus by Sophocles is lost. He appears as a character in Euripides's tragedy Andromache (c. 425 BC).

== Gallery with Thetis ==
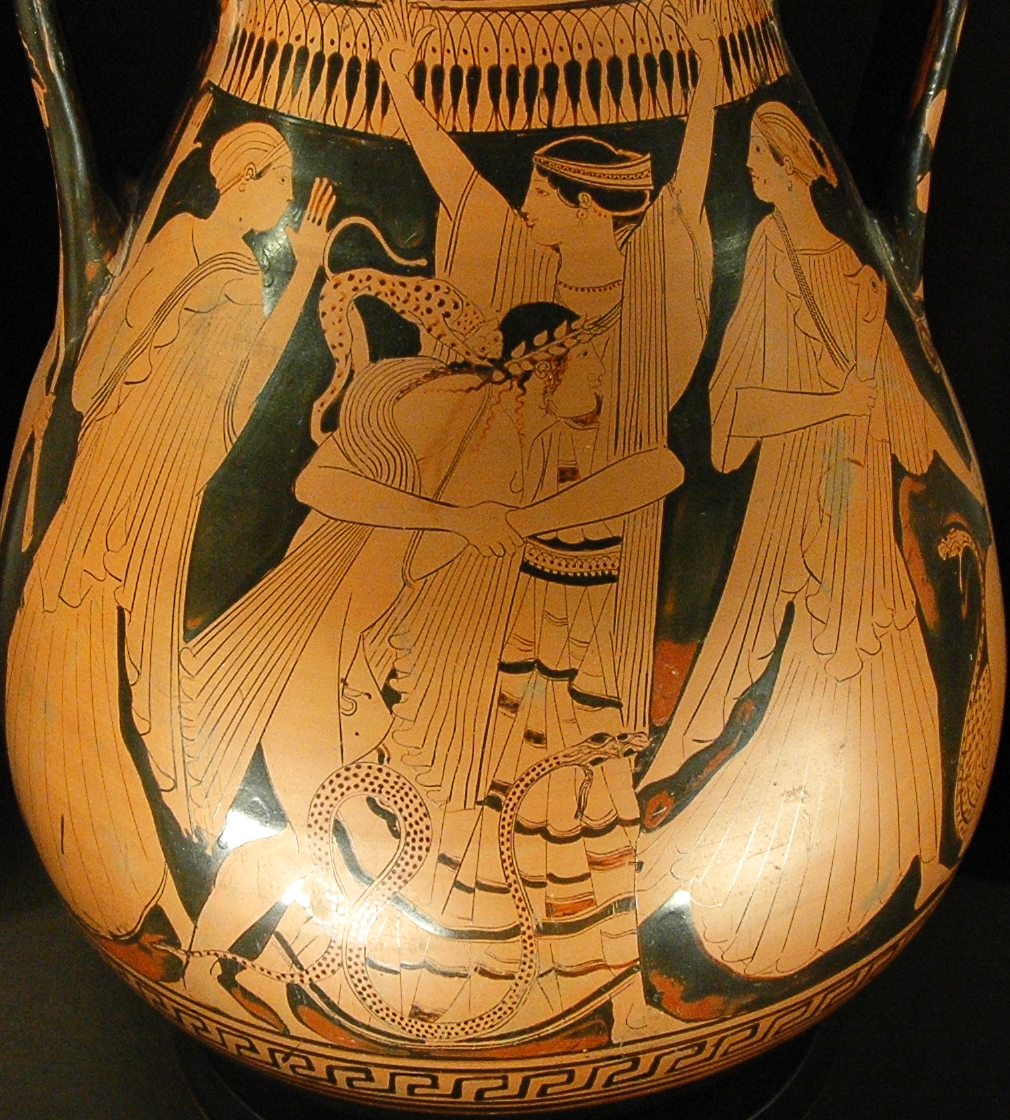

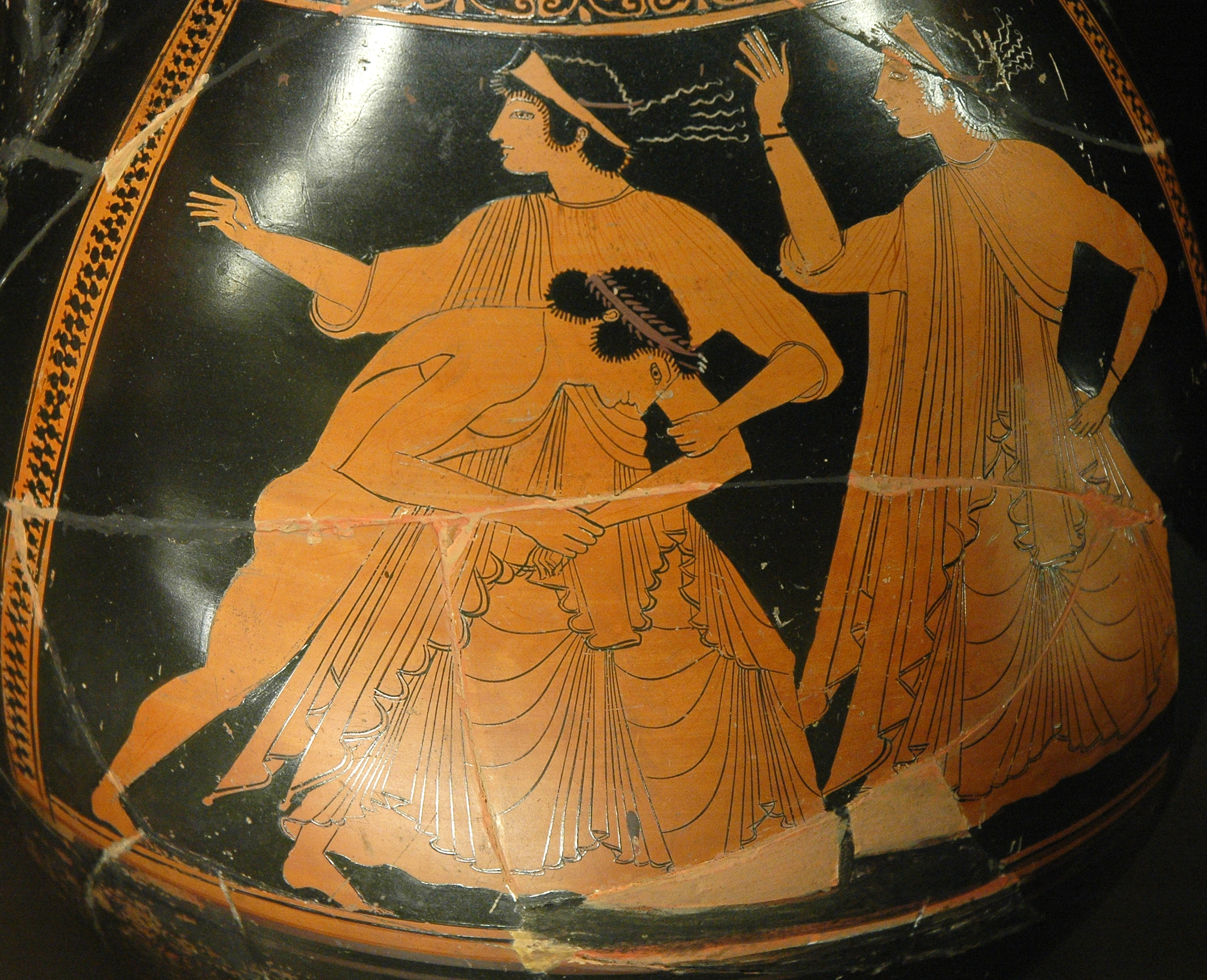

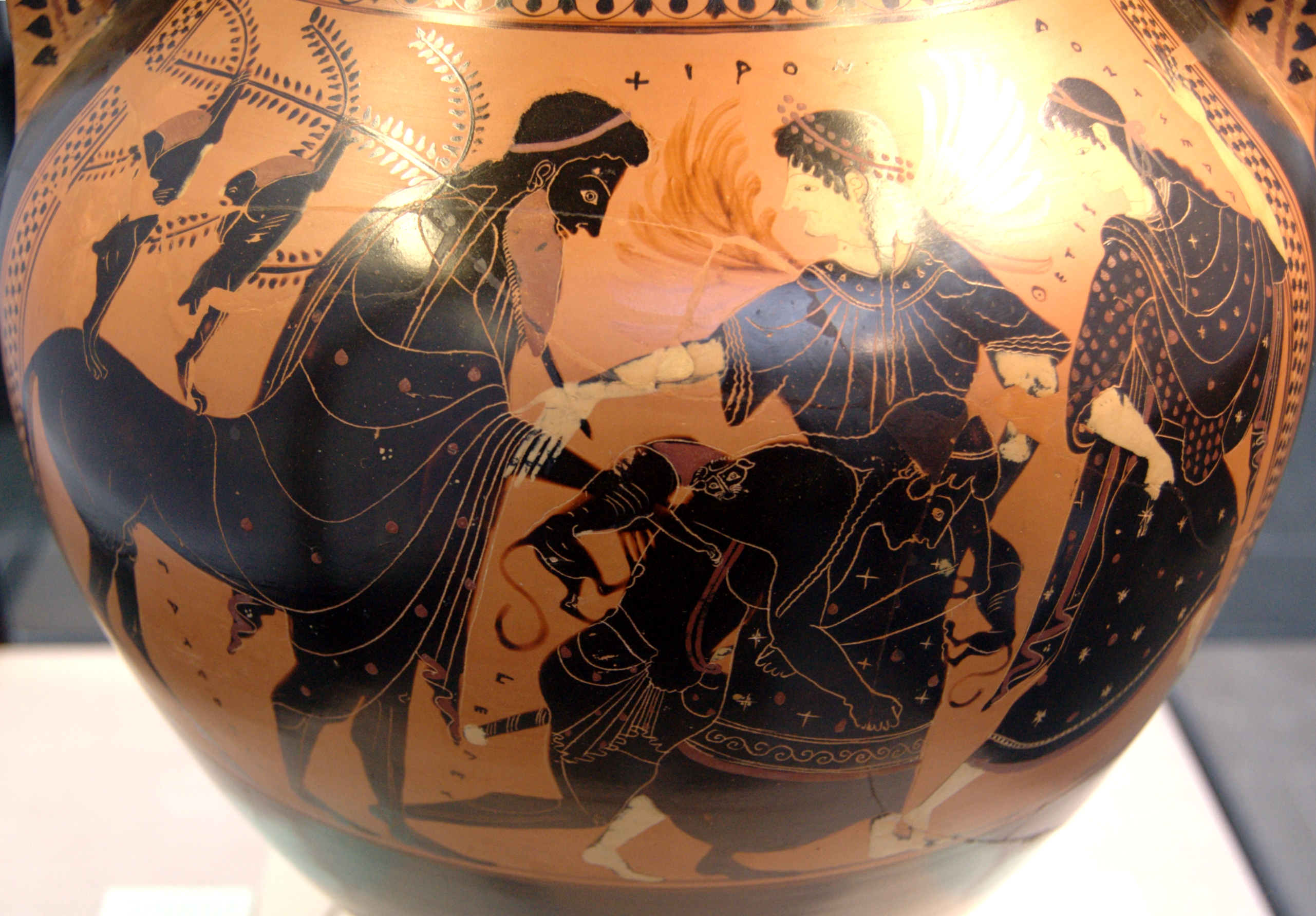

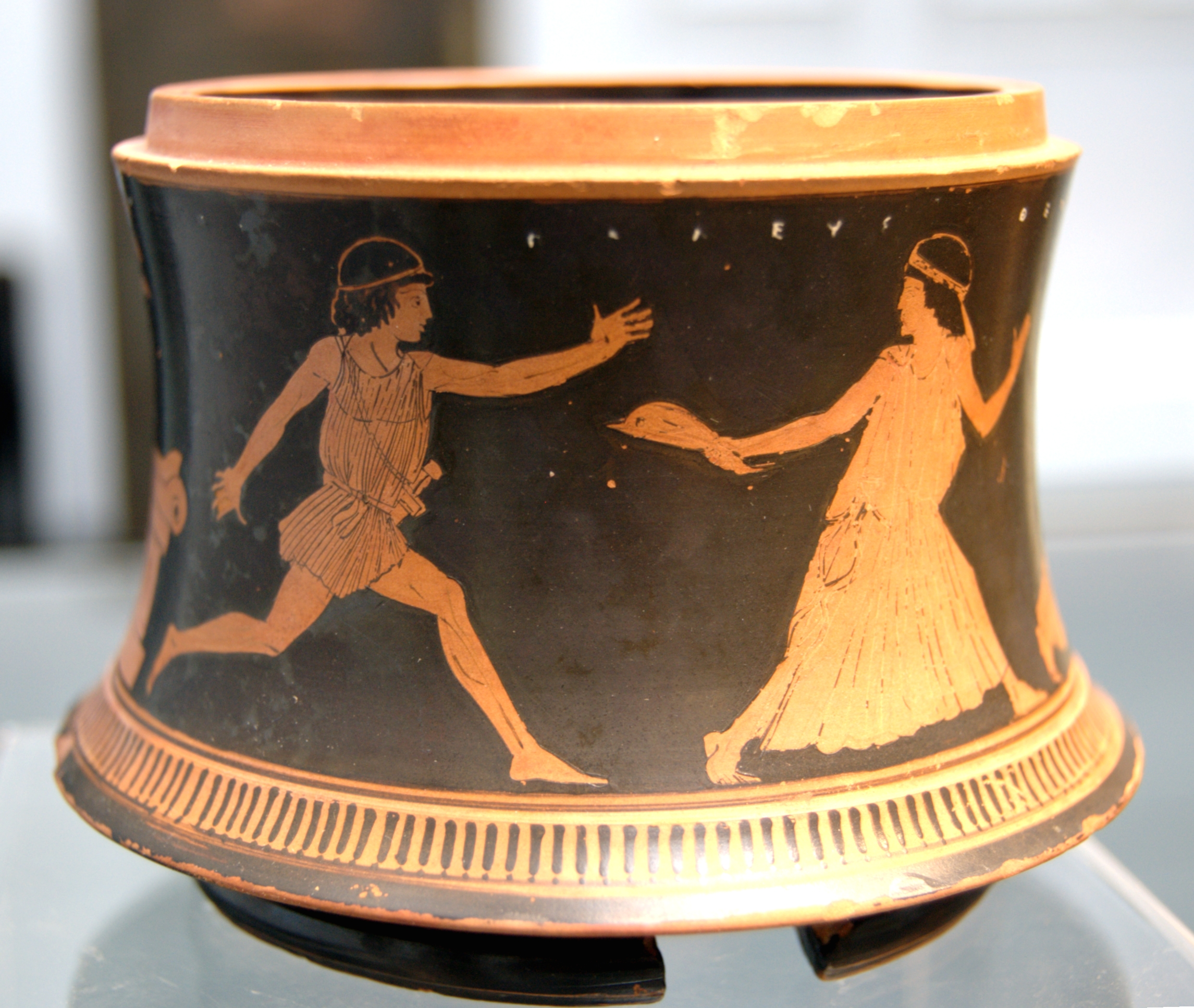

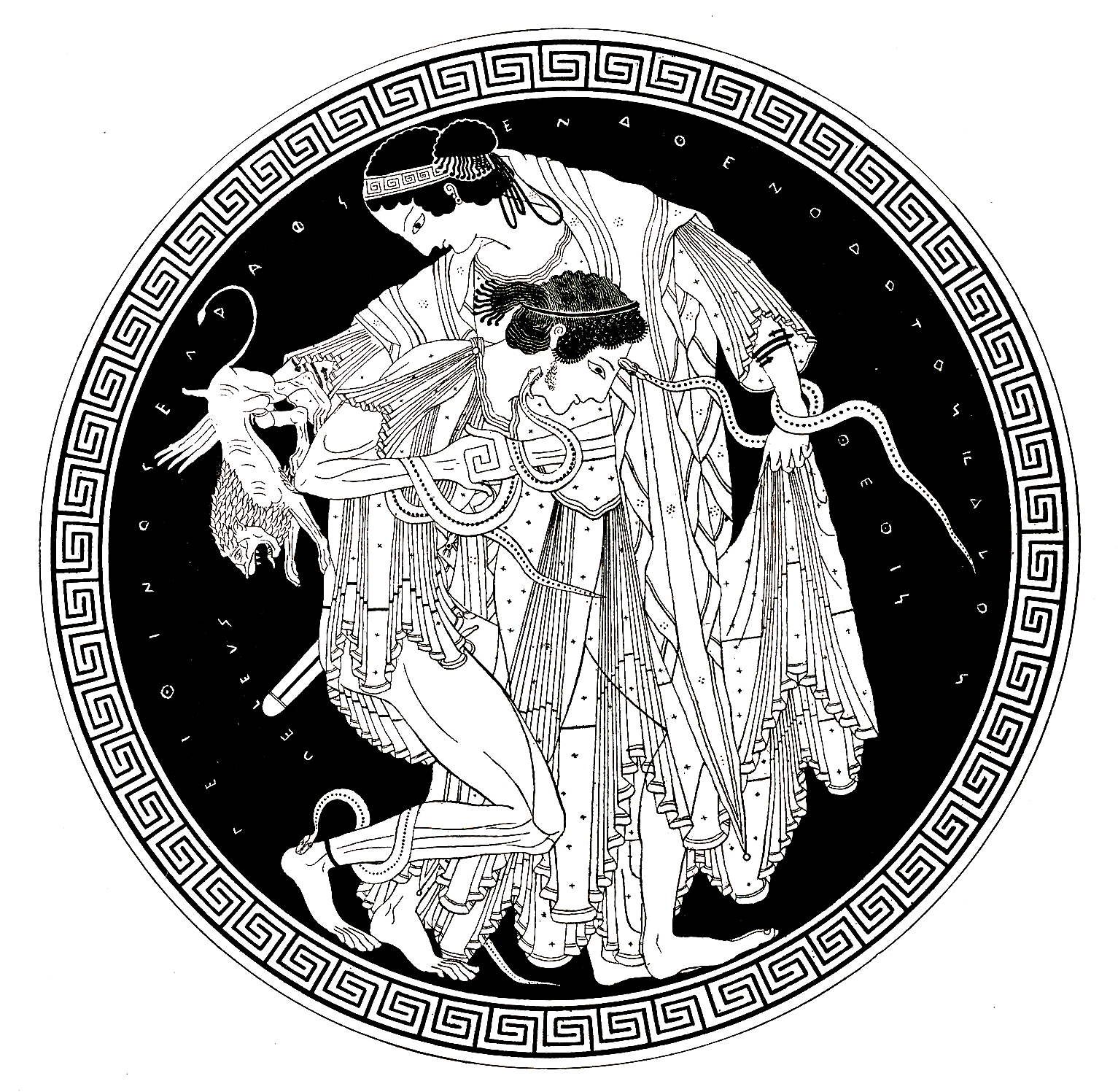

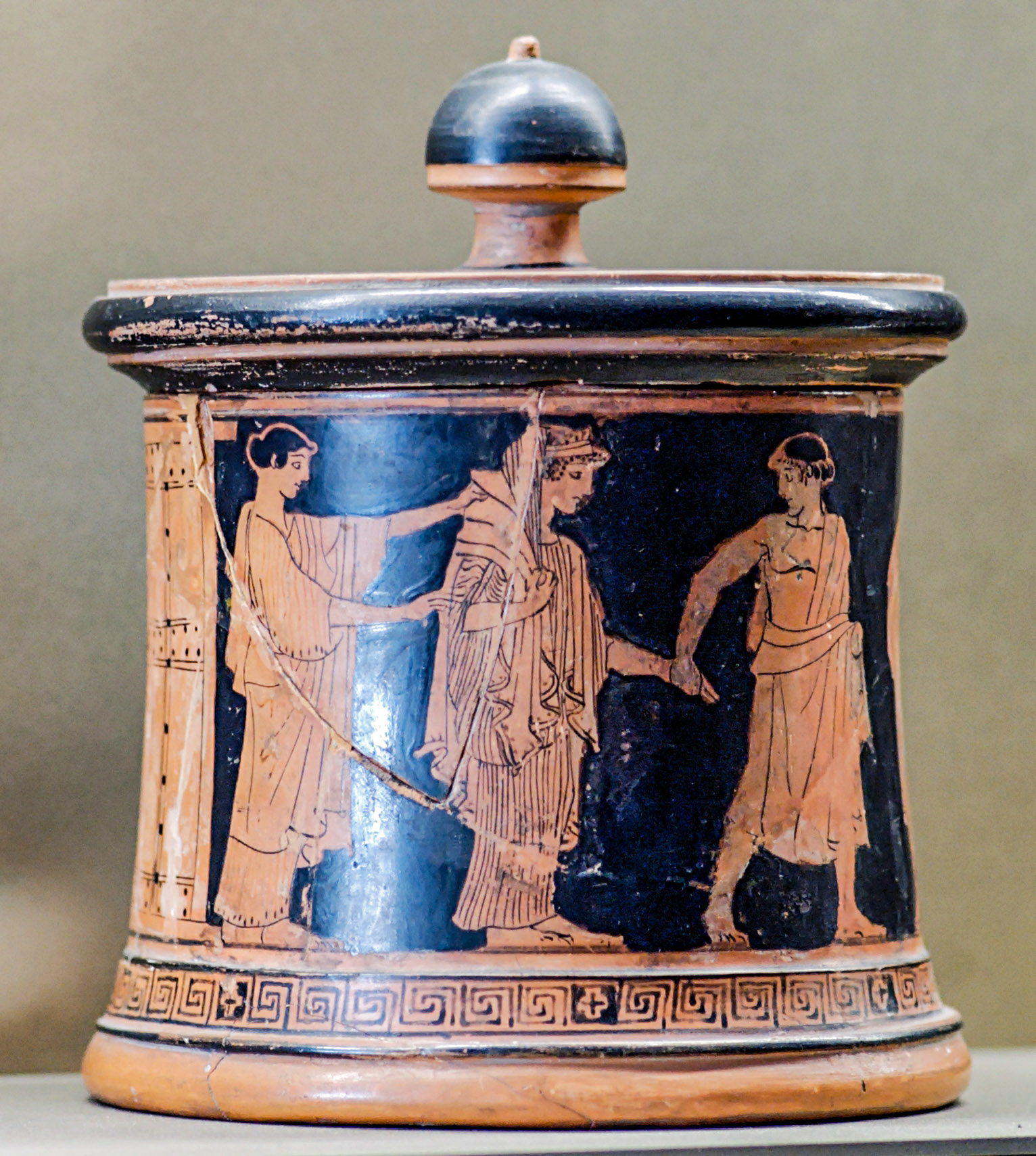

=== Wedding ===
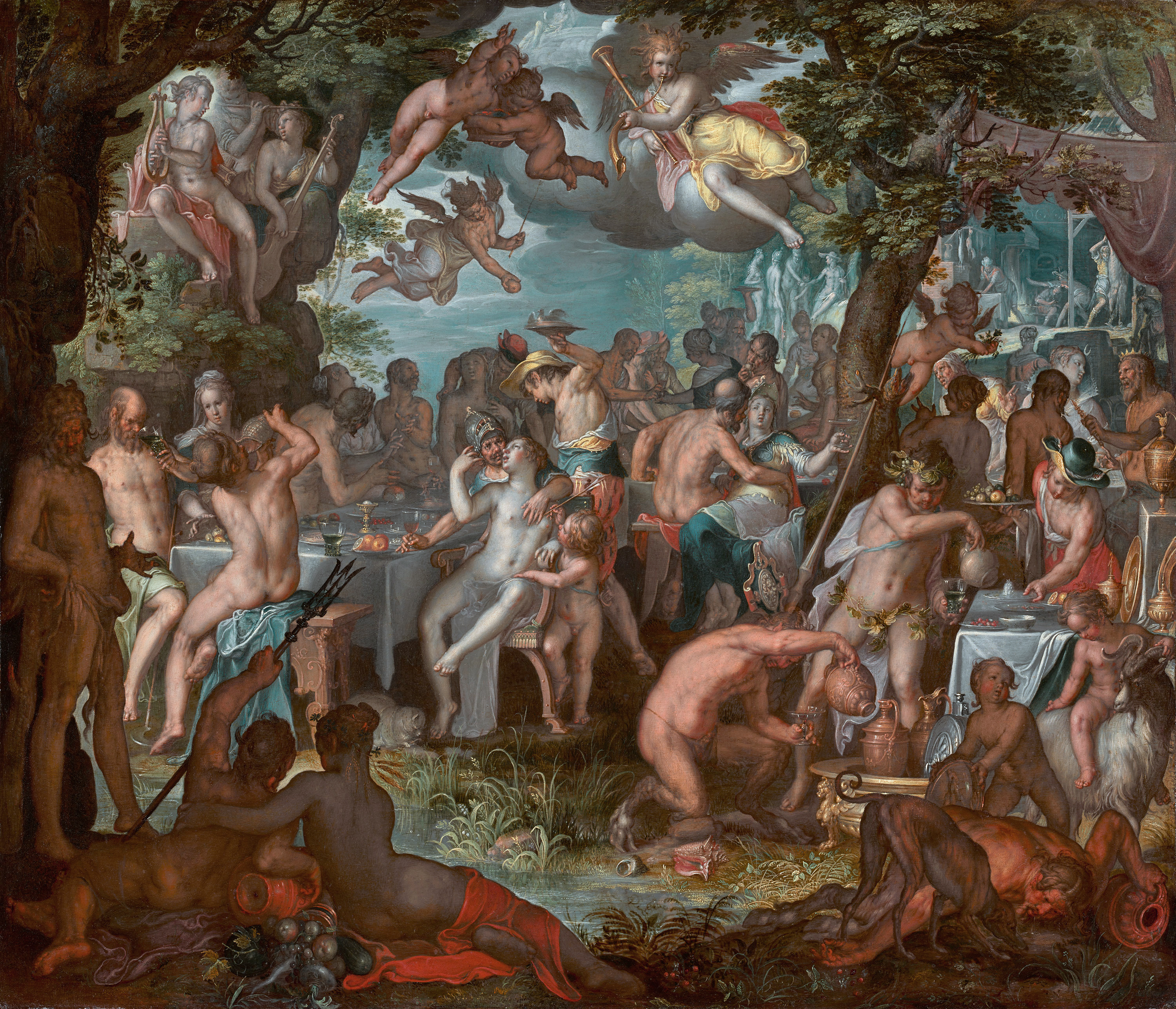

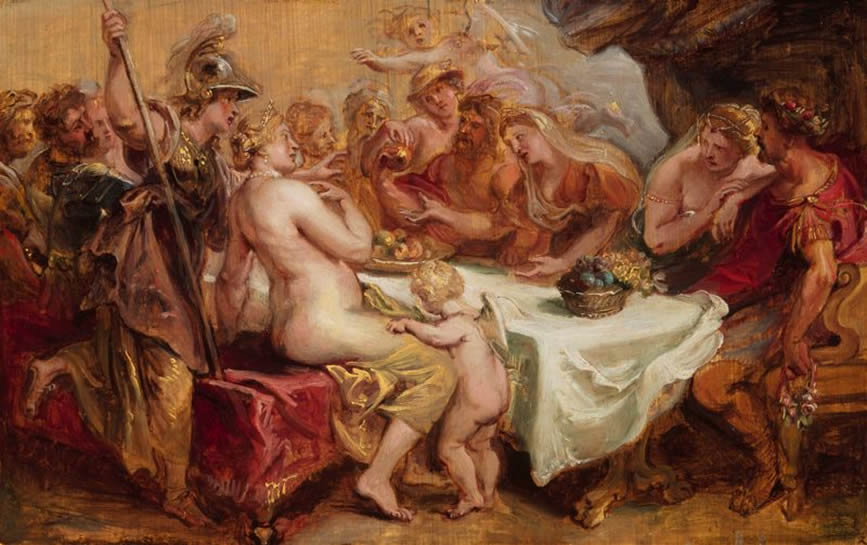

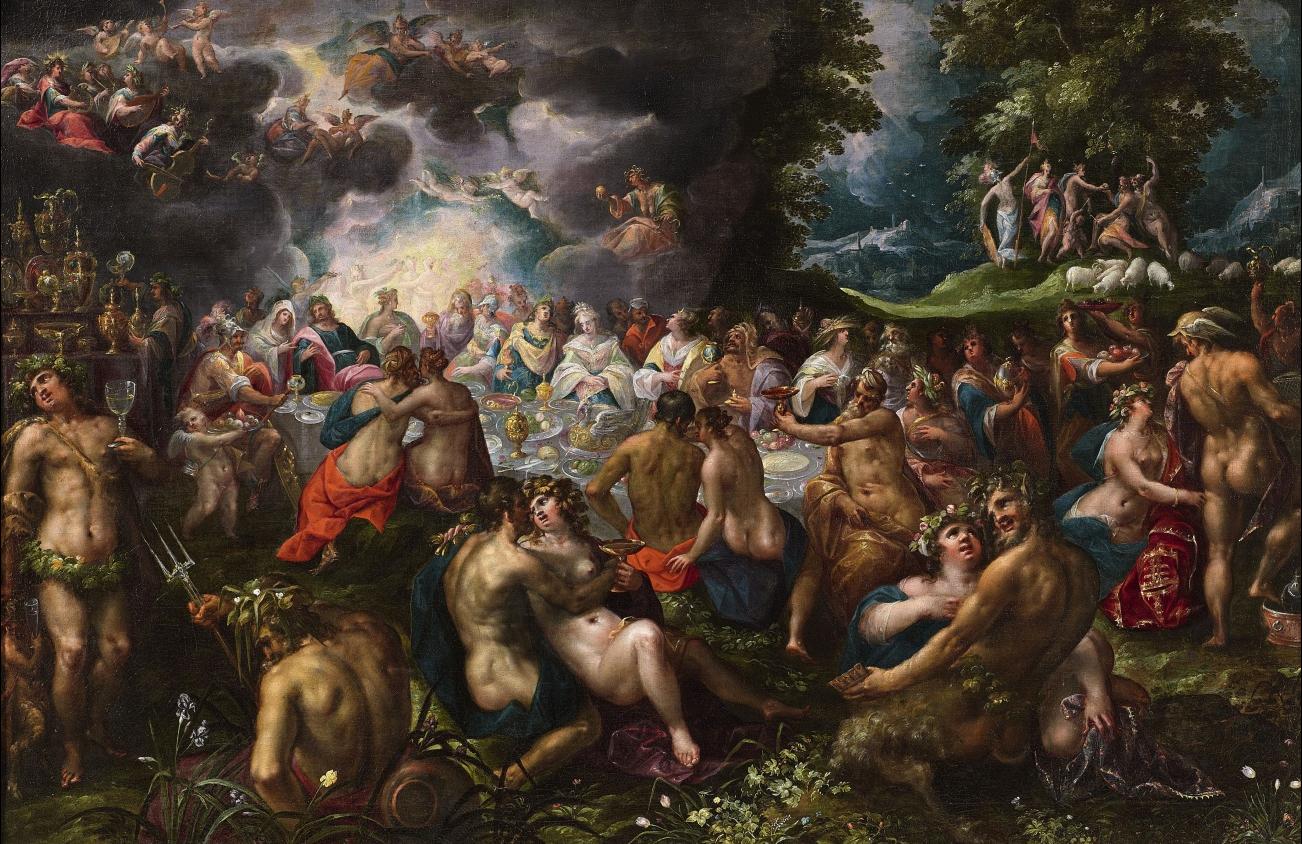

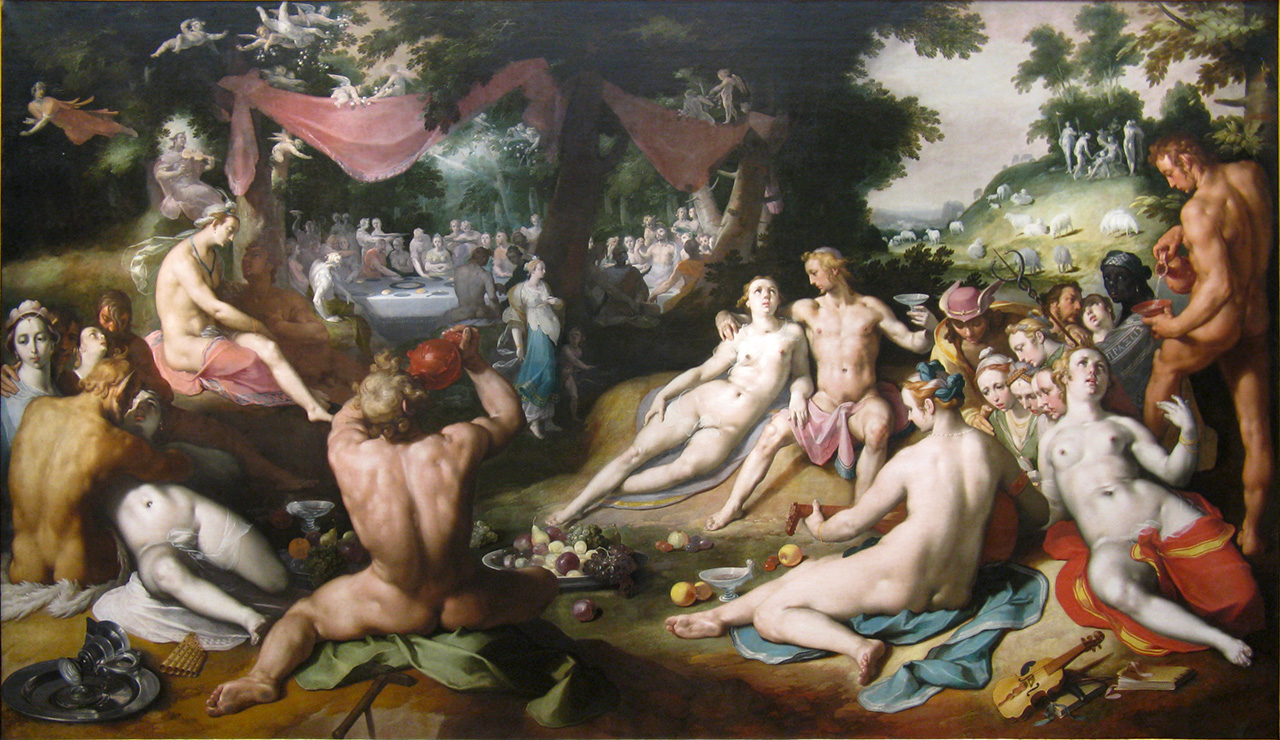

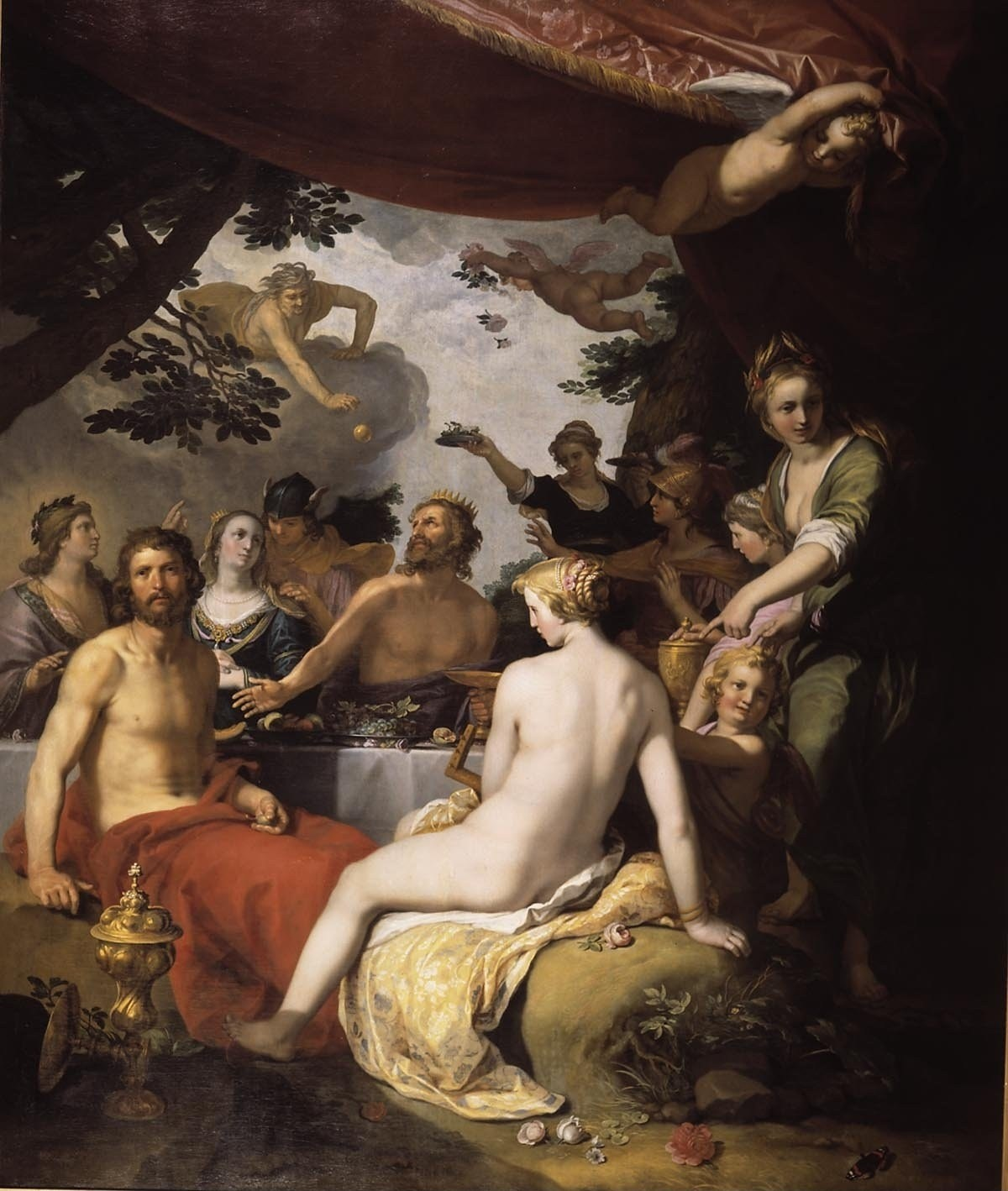

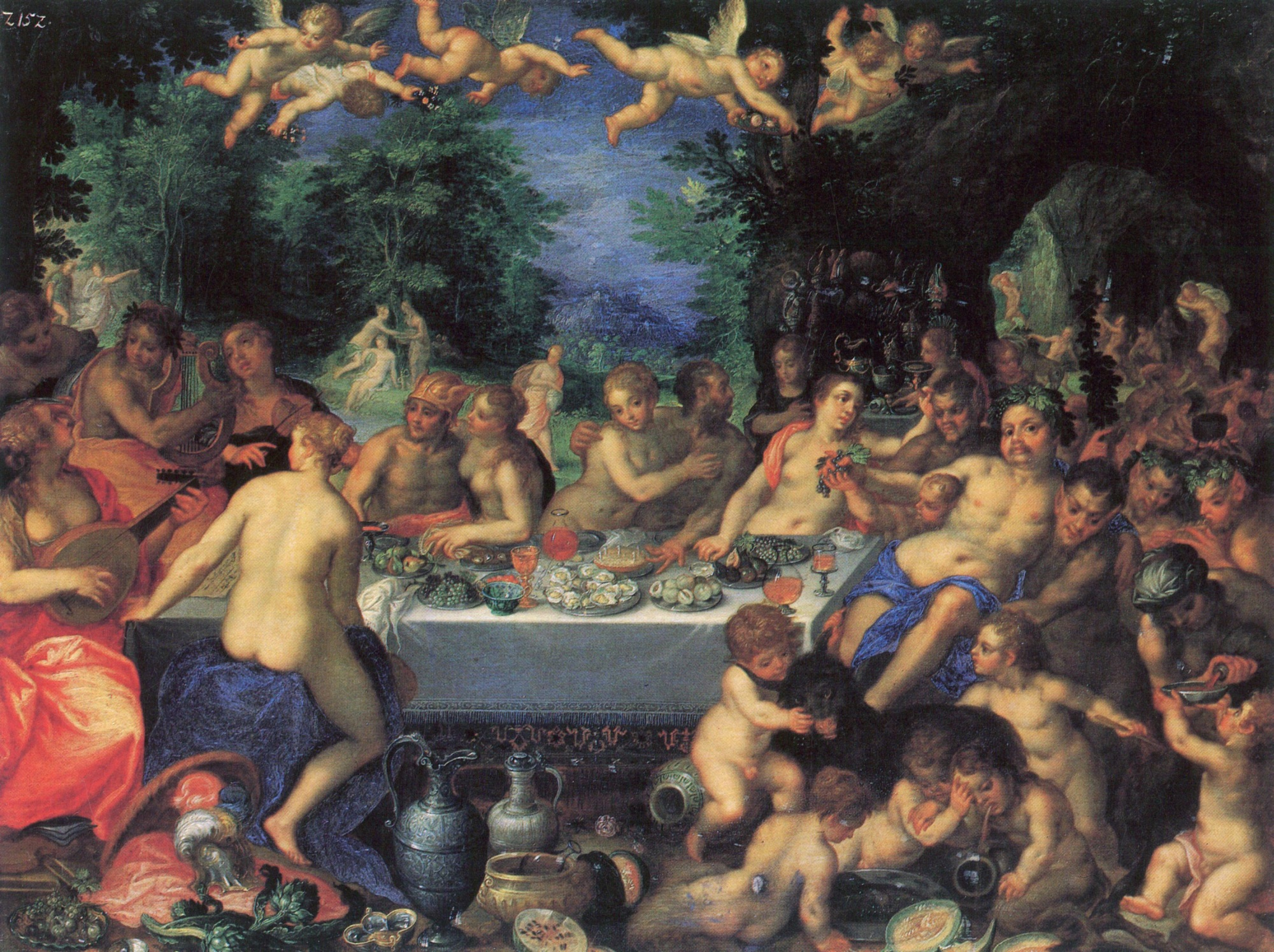

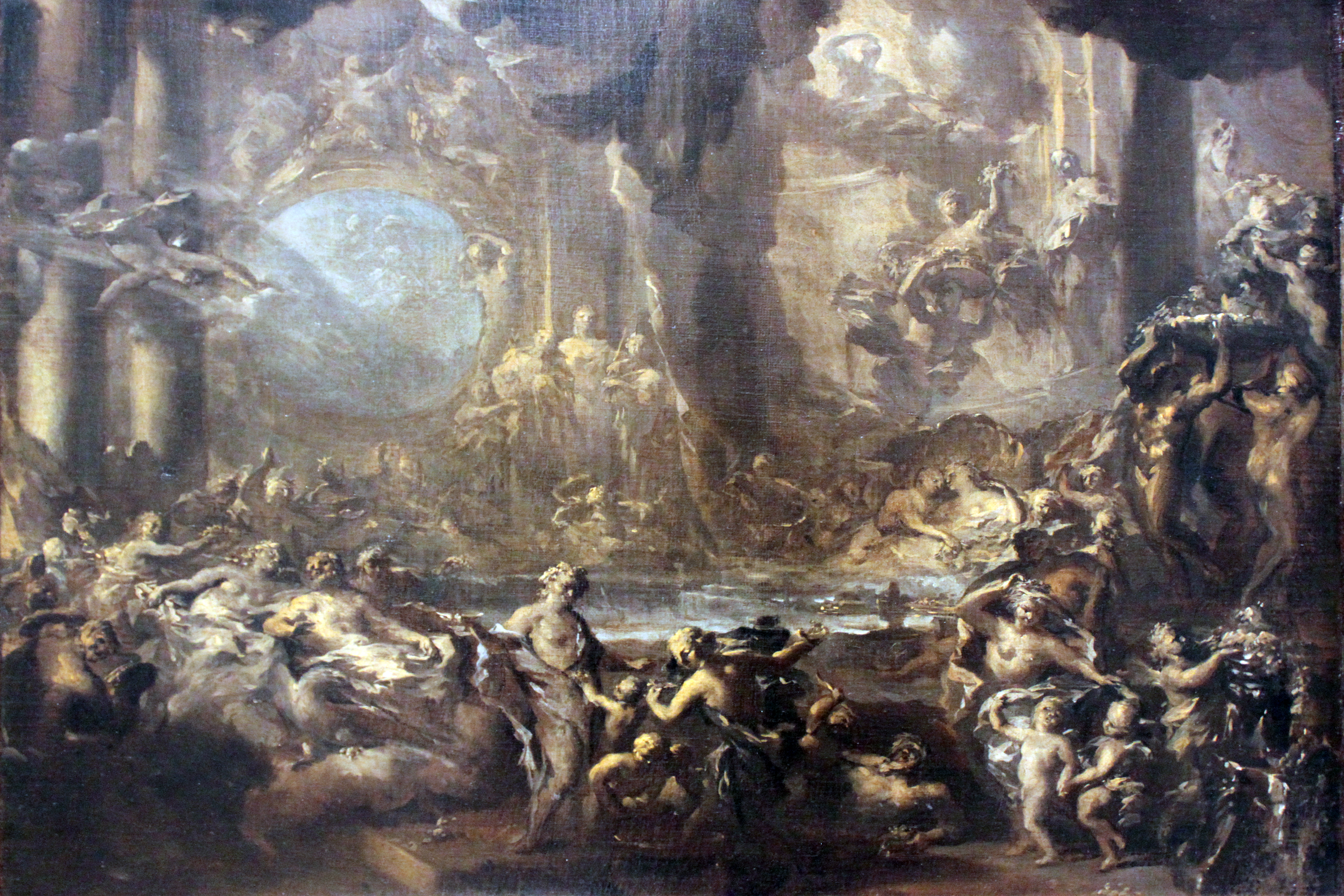

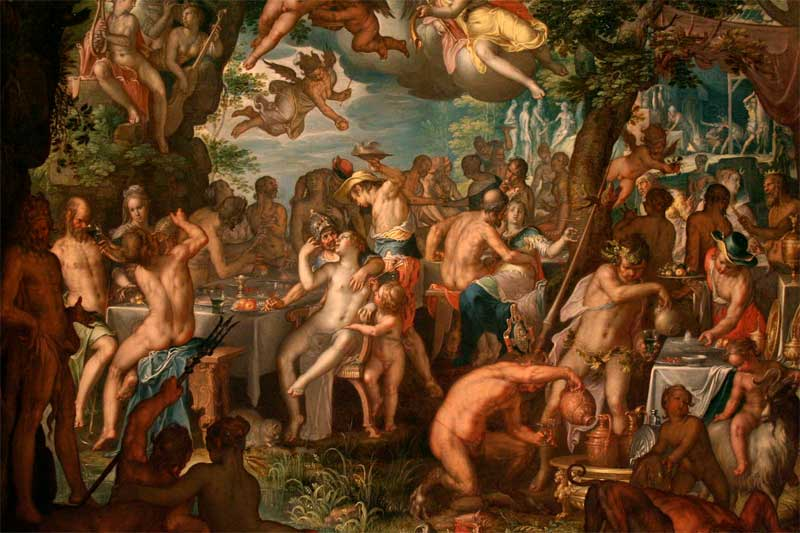

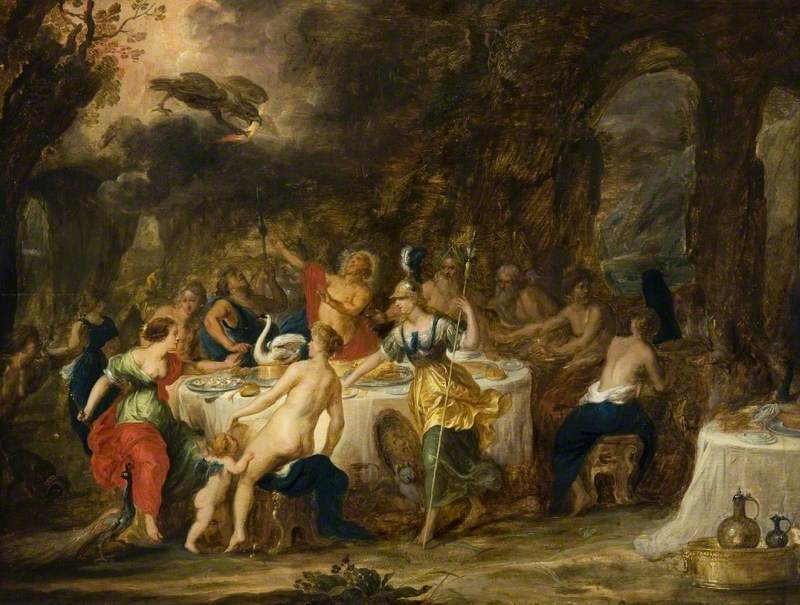

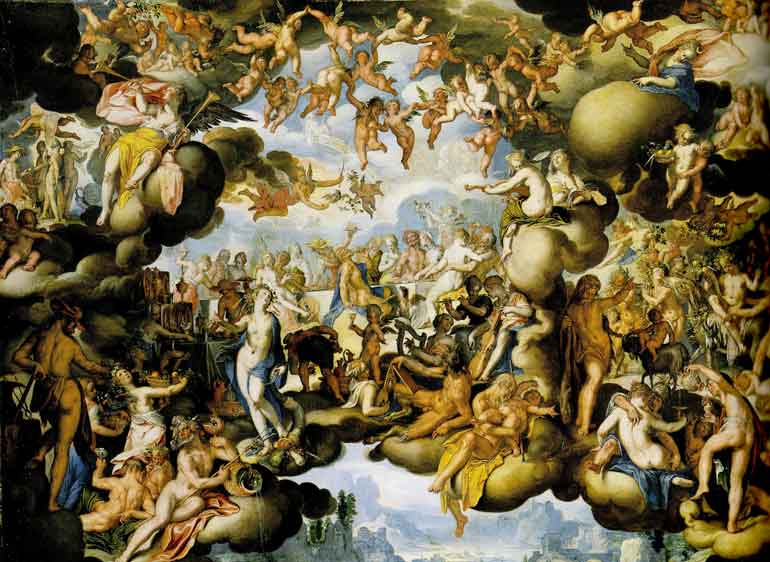

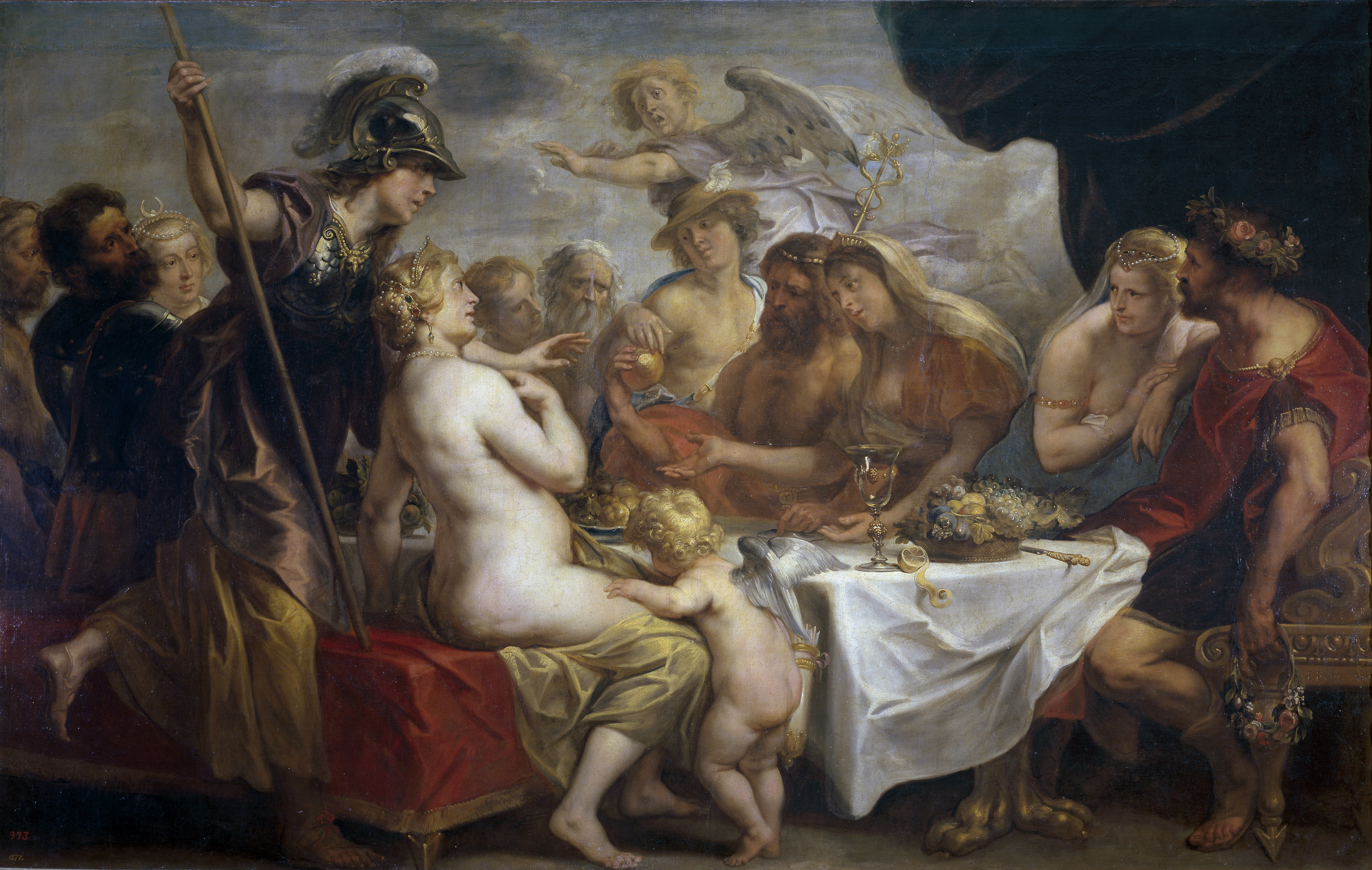

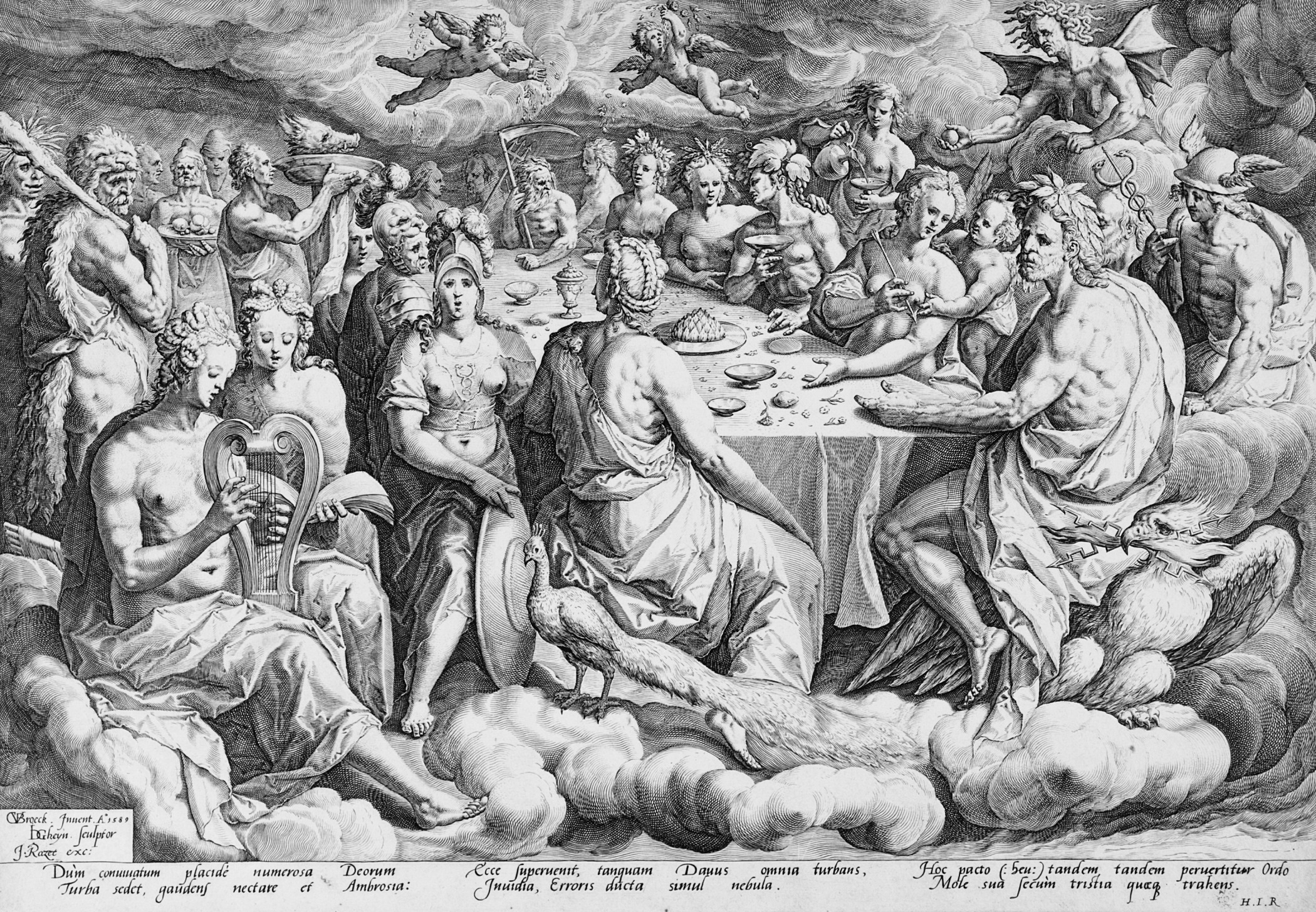

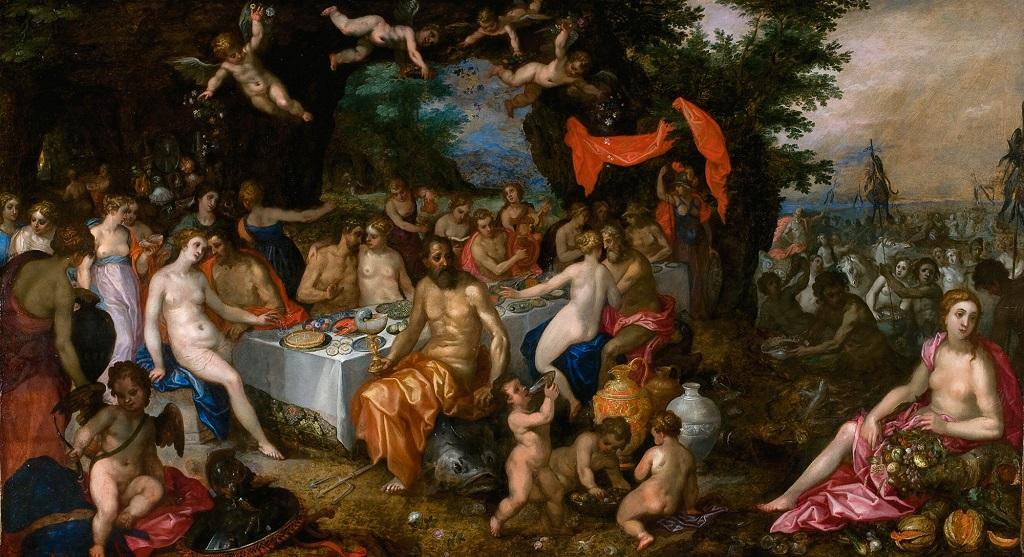

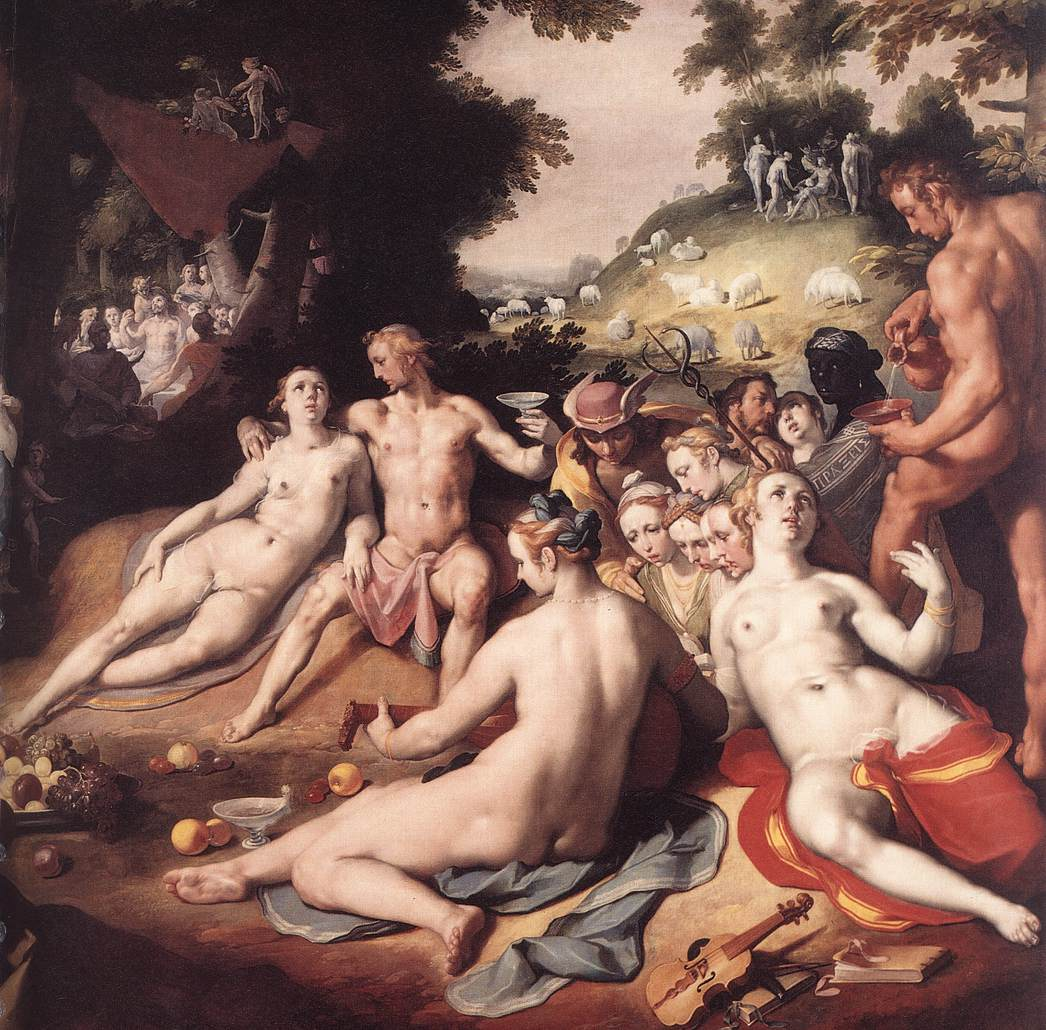

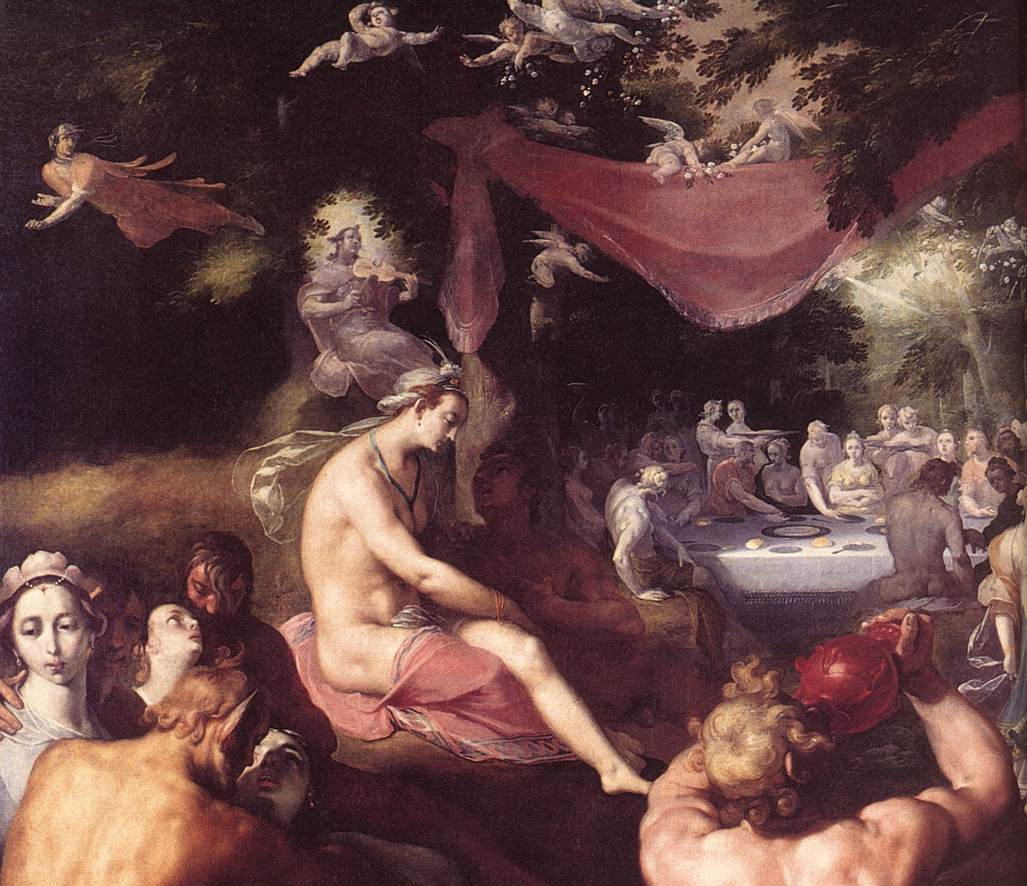

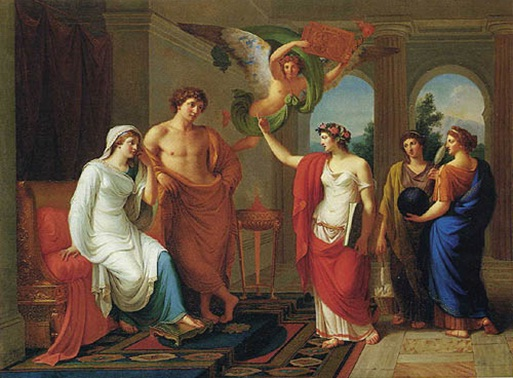

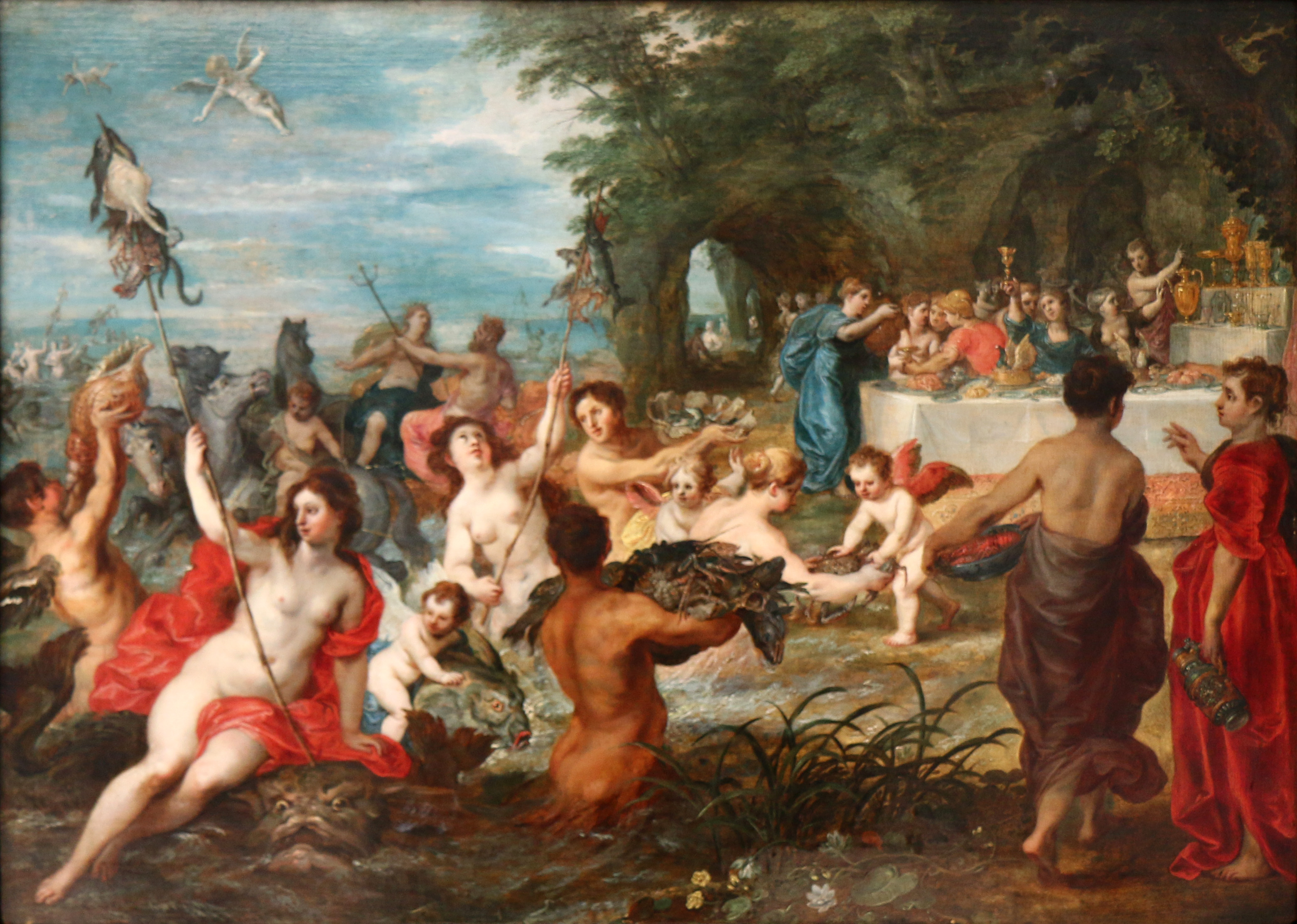

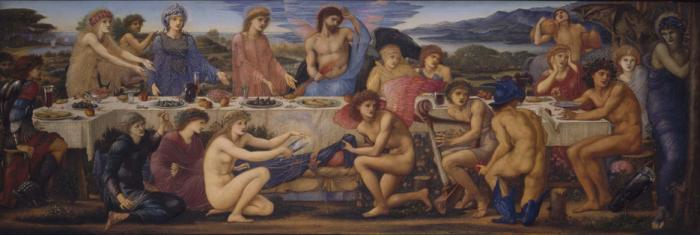

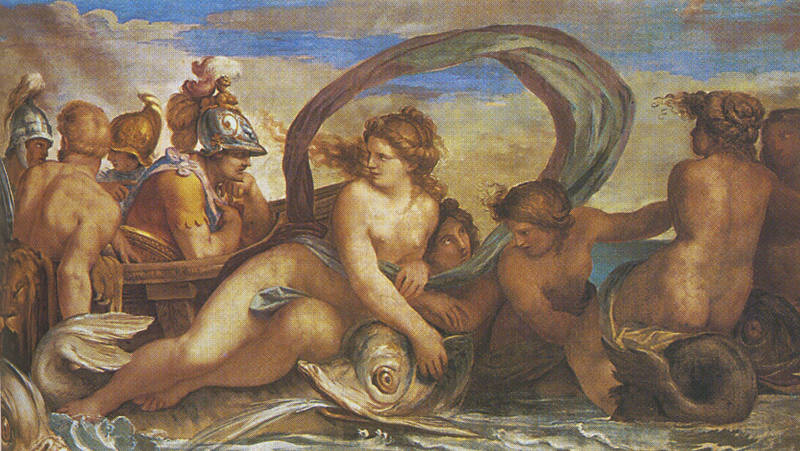

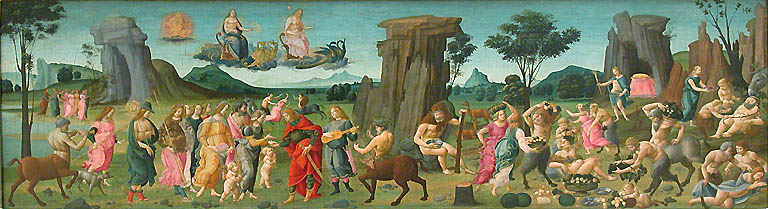

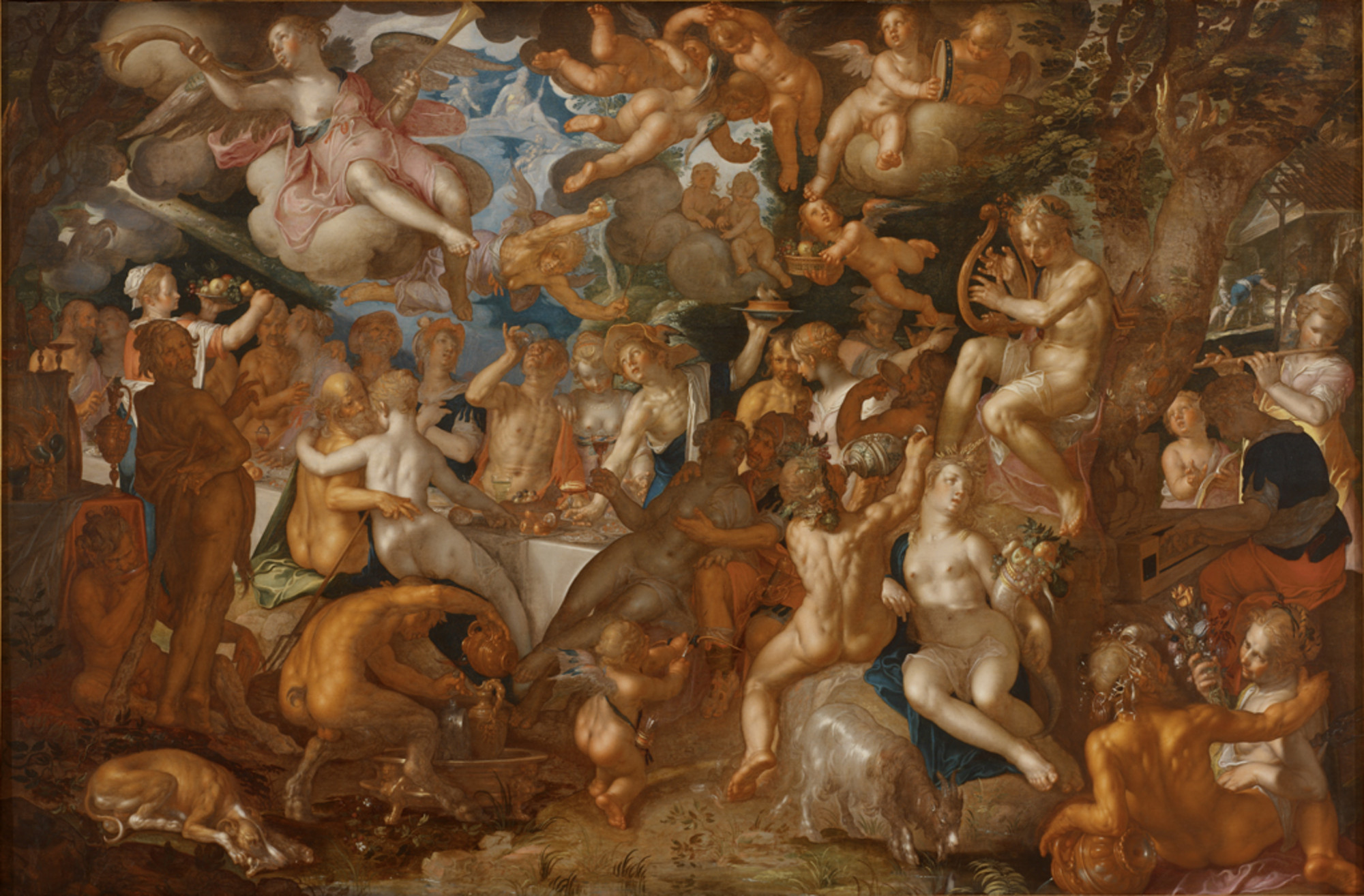

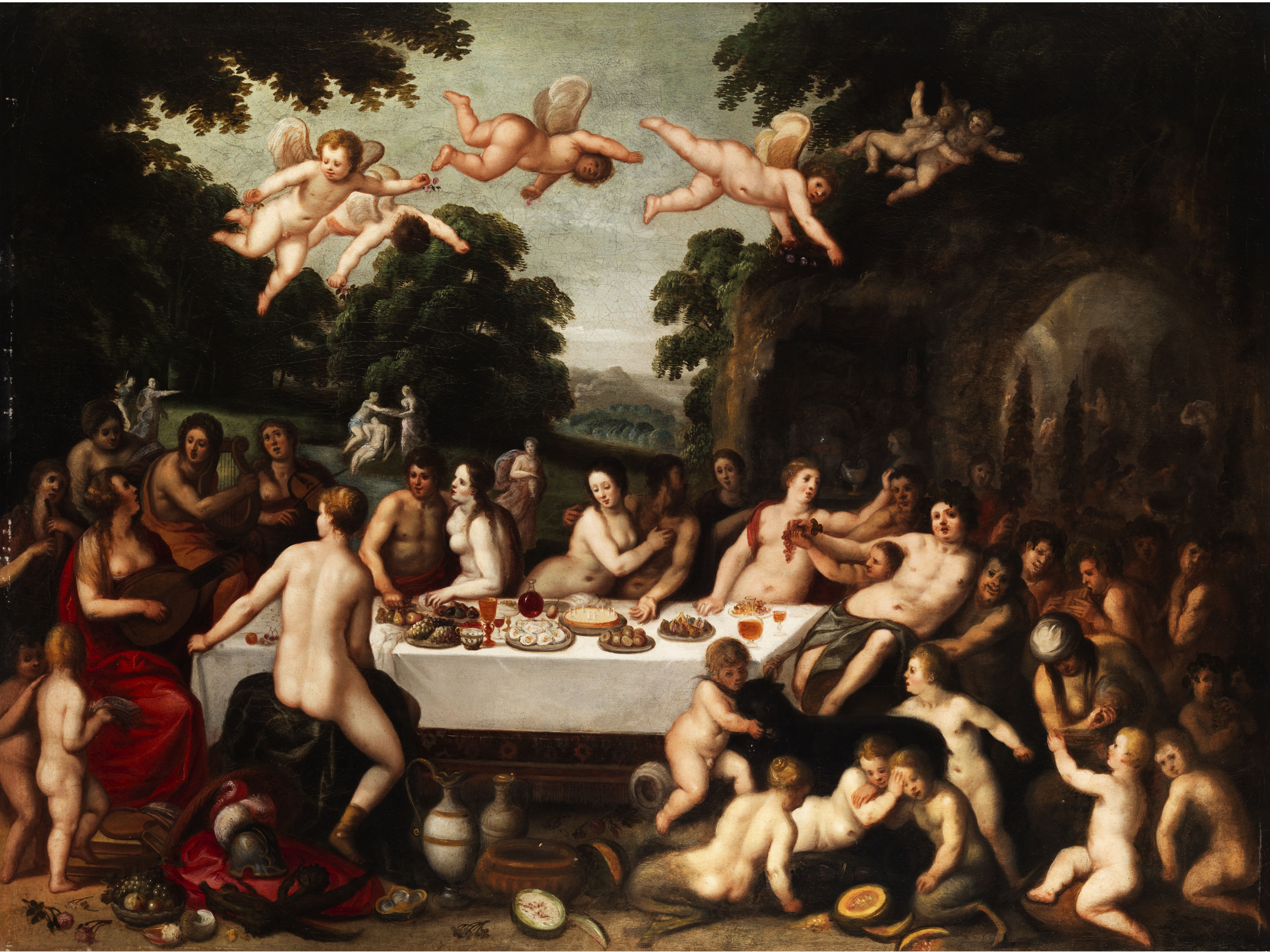

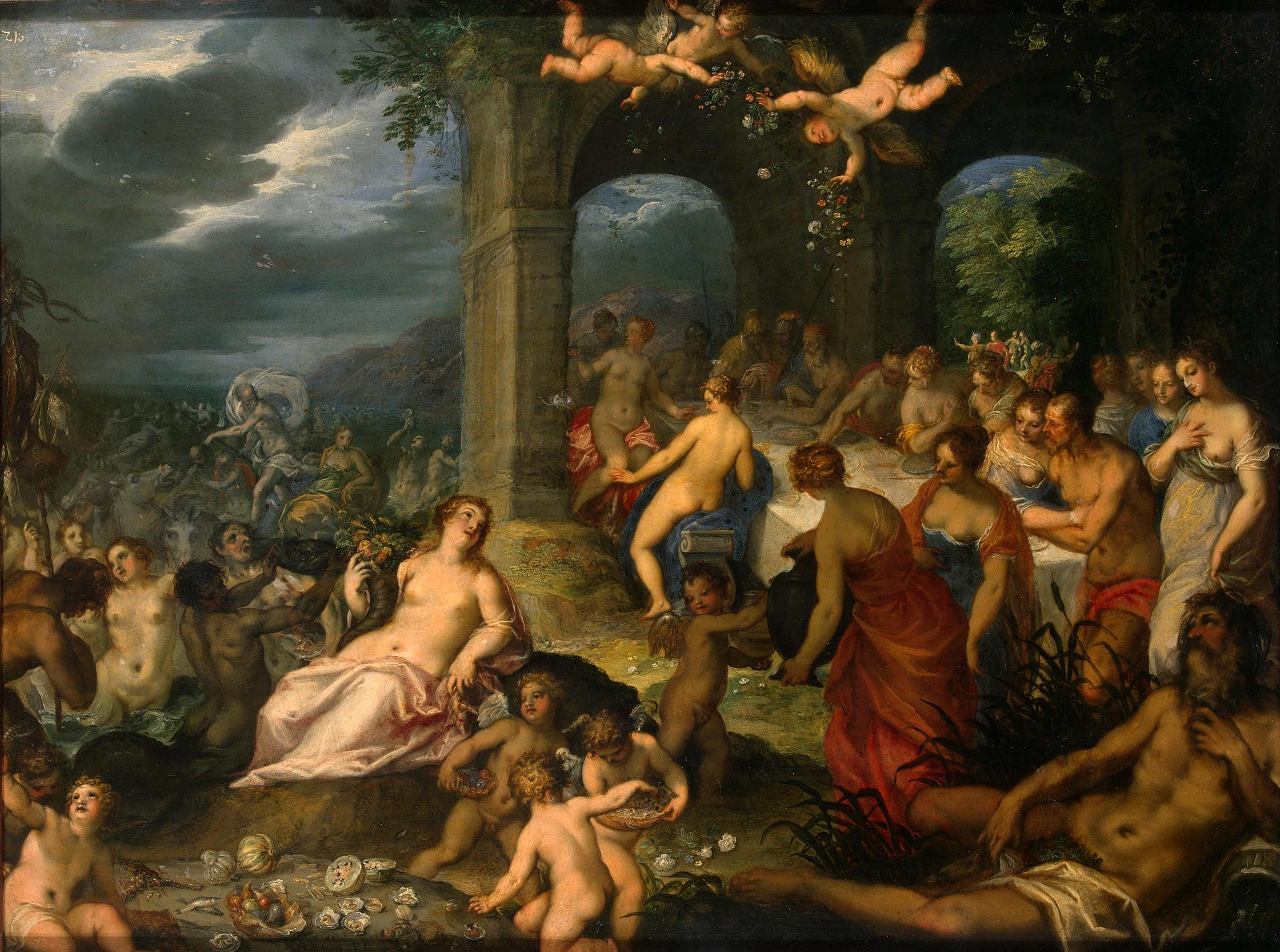

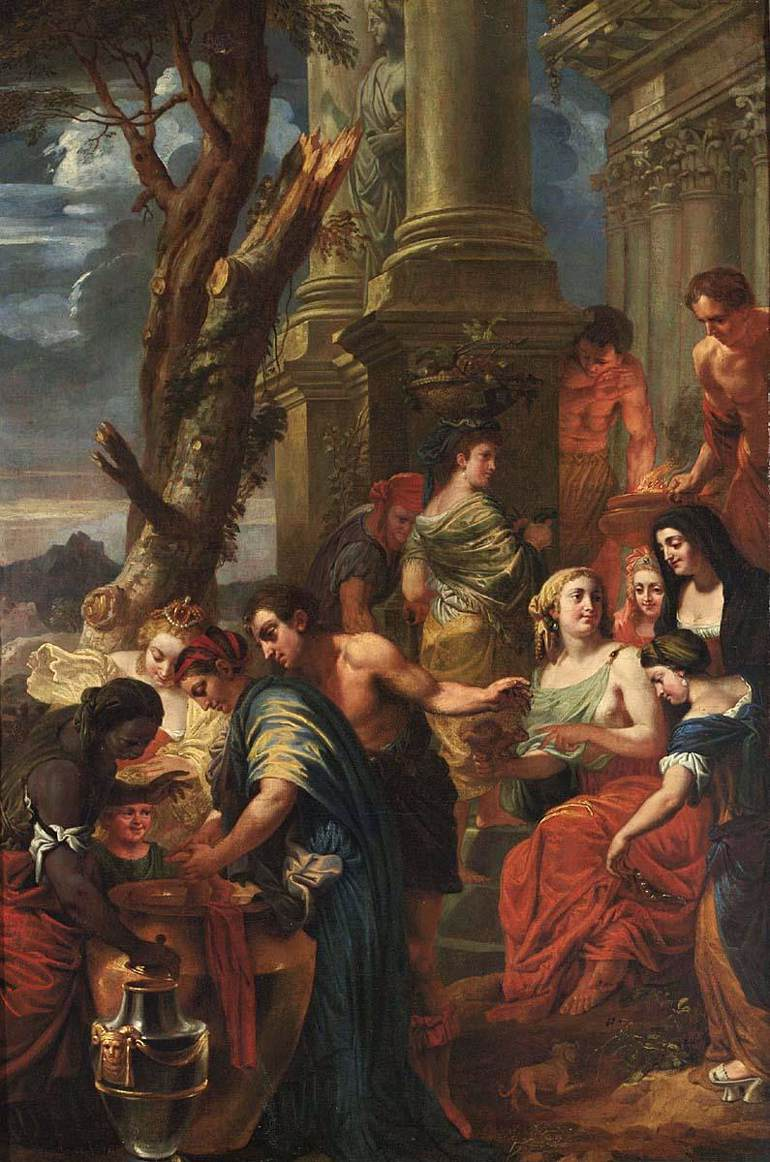
