= Nelo (mythology) =

In Greek mythology, Nelo (Ancient Greek: Νηλὼ or Νέλο, romanized: Nēlō) or Neilo (Ancient Greek: Νειλώ, romanized: Neilṓ) may refer to two distinct women:

- Neilo, one of the seven Muses who were daughters of Pierus and a Pimpleian nymph. She was the sister of Tritone, Asopo, Heptapore, Achelois, Tipoplous and Rhodia.
- Nelo, one of the 50 Danaïdes, daughters of Danaus, king of Libya (and later of Argos) by an Ethiopian woman. On the orders of her father, Nelo married and murdered her cousin–husband Menemachus, son of King Aegyptus of Egypt by a Phoenician woman.
