= Alope (Opuntian Locris) =

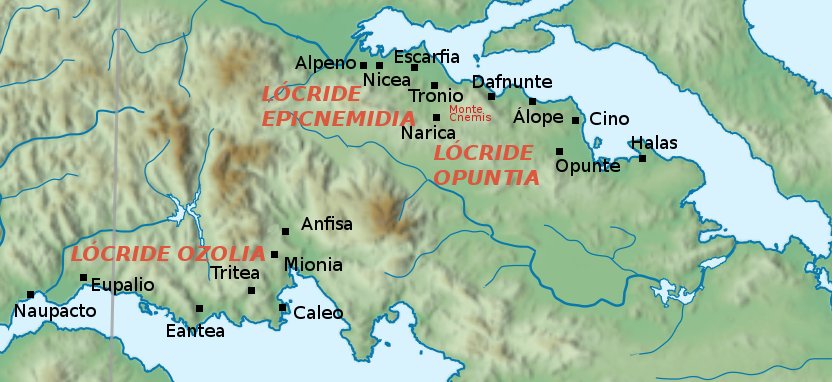
Map of the area of central Greece where some of the main cities of the Locris are located. Alope is shown along the eastern coast. Note: the map is in Spanish.

Alope (Ancient Greek: Ἀλόπη, romanized: Alópē) was a town of Opuntian Locris on the coast between Daphnus (modern Agios Konstantinos) and Cynus (modern Livanates). Its ruins have been discovered by William Gell on an isolated hill near the shore in the modern village of Melidoni, Phthiotis (Greek: Μελιδόνι Φθιώτιδας).

== History ==
Concerning the history of the city, the Locrians were defeated by the Athenians under Kleopompos in 431 BCE nearby, and the city was taken. It suffered greatly from the terrible earthquake of 426 BCE, according to Demetrius Callatianus quoted by Strabo.
