= Phthia =

In Greek mythology city or district in ancient Thessaly

Coordinates: 38°54′N 22°32′E

- Greek mythology location
- Created by: Homer

In-universe information
- Other name: Φθία / Φθίη
- Type: City / District
- Ruled by: Aeacus (founder); Peleus; Achilles; Neoptolemus
- Character: Myrmidons

Phthia (/ˈθaɪə/; Ancient Greek: Φθία or Φθίη Phthía, Phthíē) was a city or district in ancient Thessaly according to Greek mythology. It is frequently mentioned in Homer's Iliad as the home of the Myrmidons, the contingent led by Achilles in the Trojan War.

== In literature ==
It is frequently mentioned in Homer's Iliad as the home of the Myrmidons. It was founded by Aeacus, grandfather of Achilles, and was the home of Achilles' father Peleus, mother Thetis (a sea nymph), and son Neoptolemus (who reigned as king after the Trojan War).

Phthia is referenced in Plato's Crito, where Socrates, in jail and awaiting his execution, relates a dream he has had (43d–44b): "I thought that a beautiful and comely woman dressed in white approached me. She called me and said: 'Socrates, may you arrive at fertile Phthia on the third day.'" The reference is to Homer's Iliad (ix.363), when Achilles, angered by his honor being insulted by Agamemnon, rejects Agamemnon's conciliatory presents and threatens to set sail in the morning; he says that with good weather he might arrive on the third day "in fertile Phthia"—his home.

Phthia is the setting of Euripides' play Andromache, a play set after the Trojan War, when Achilles' son Neoptolemus (in some translations named Pyrrhus) has taken Andromache, the widow of the Trojan hero Hector as a slave.

Mackie (2002) notes the linguistic association of Phthia with the Greek word φθίσις phthisis "consumption, decline; wasting away" (in English, phthisis has been used as a synonym for tuberculosis) and the connection of the place name with a withering death. This suggests the possibility of a wordplay in Homer, associating Achilles' home with such a withering death.

== Location of Phthia ==
The Homeric Catalogue of Ships speaks of Achilles' kingdom as follows (Hom. Il. 2.680-5):

Now again all those who dwelt in Pelasgic Argos:
those who dwelt in Alos and Alope and Trachis
and those who held Phthia and Hellas with its fair women,
and who were called Myrmidons and Hellenes and Achaians;
of those fifty ships the leader was Achilles.

These names are generally believed to have referred to places in the Spercheios valley in what is now Phthiotis in central Greece. The river Spercheios was associated with Achilles, and at Iliad 23.144 Achilles states that his father Peleus had vowed that Achilles would dedicate a lock of his hair to the river when he returned home safely.

However, a number of ancient sources, such as Euripides' Andromache, also located Phthia further north in the area of Pharsalus. Strabo also notes that near the cities of Pharsalus and Palaepharsalus there was a shrine dedicated to Achilles' mother Thetis, the Thetideion. Mycenean remains have been found in Pharsalus, and also in other sites nearby, but according to Denys Page, whether the Homeric Phthia is to be identified with Pharsalus "remains as doubtful as ever".

It has been suggested that "Pelasgic Argos" is a general name for the whole of northern Greece, and that line 2.681 of the Iliad is meant to serve as a general introduction to the remaining nine contingents of the Catalogue.

== See also ==
- Phthiotis (modern Greece)
- Magnesia (regional unit)
- Thessaly
