= The Story of Perseus and the Gorgon's Head =

1898 novel by Charles Kingsley

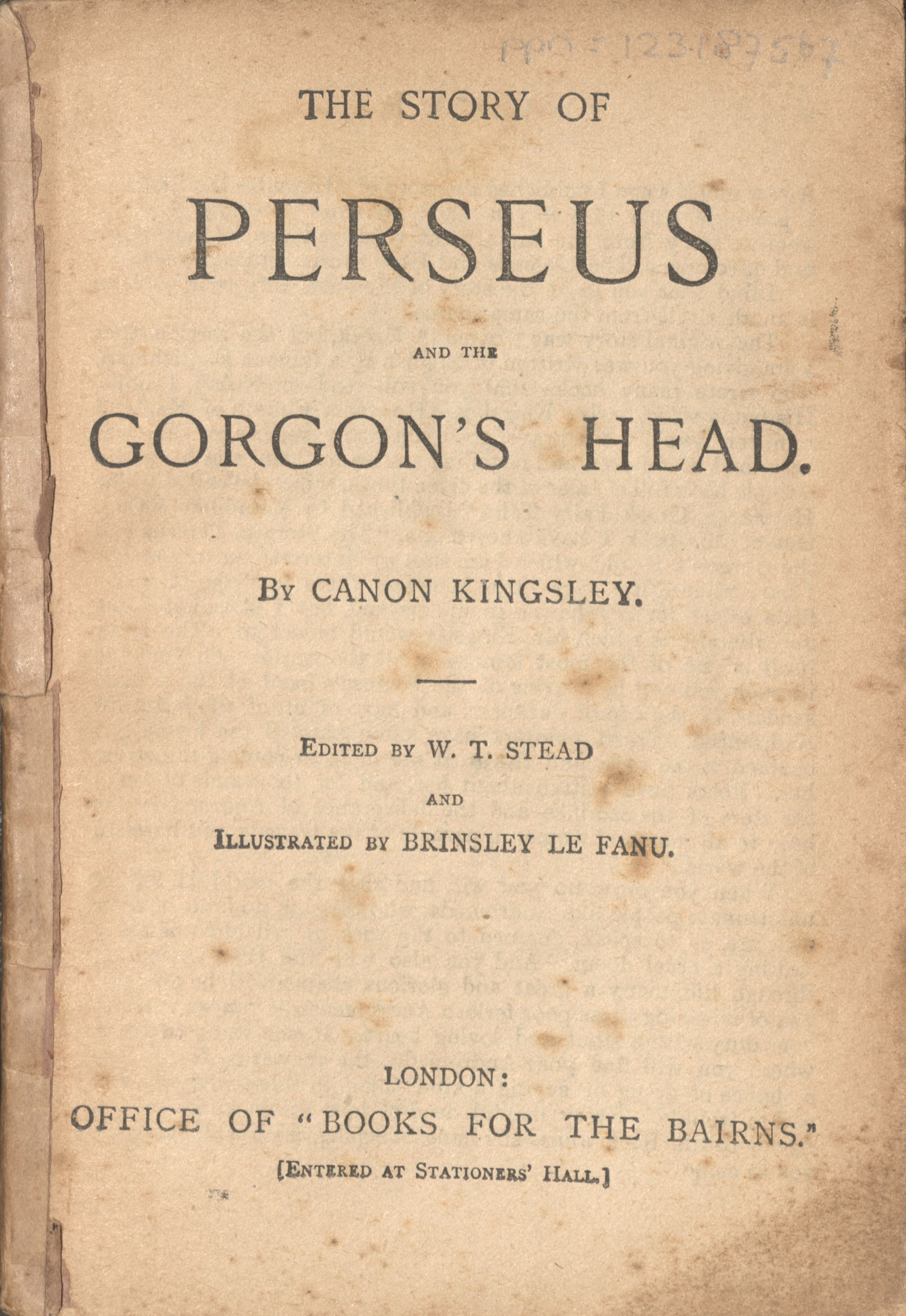
Title page

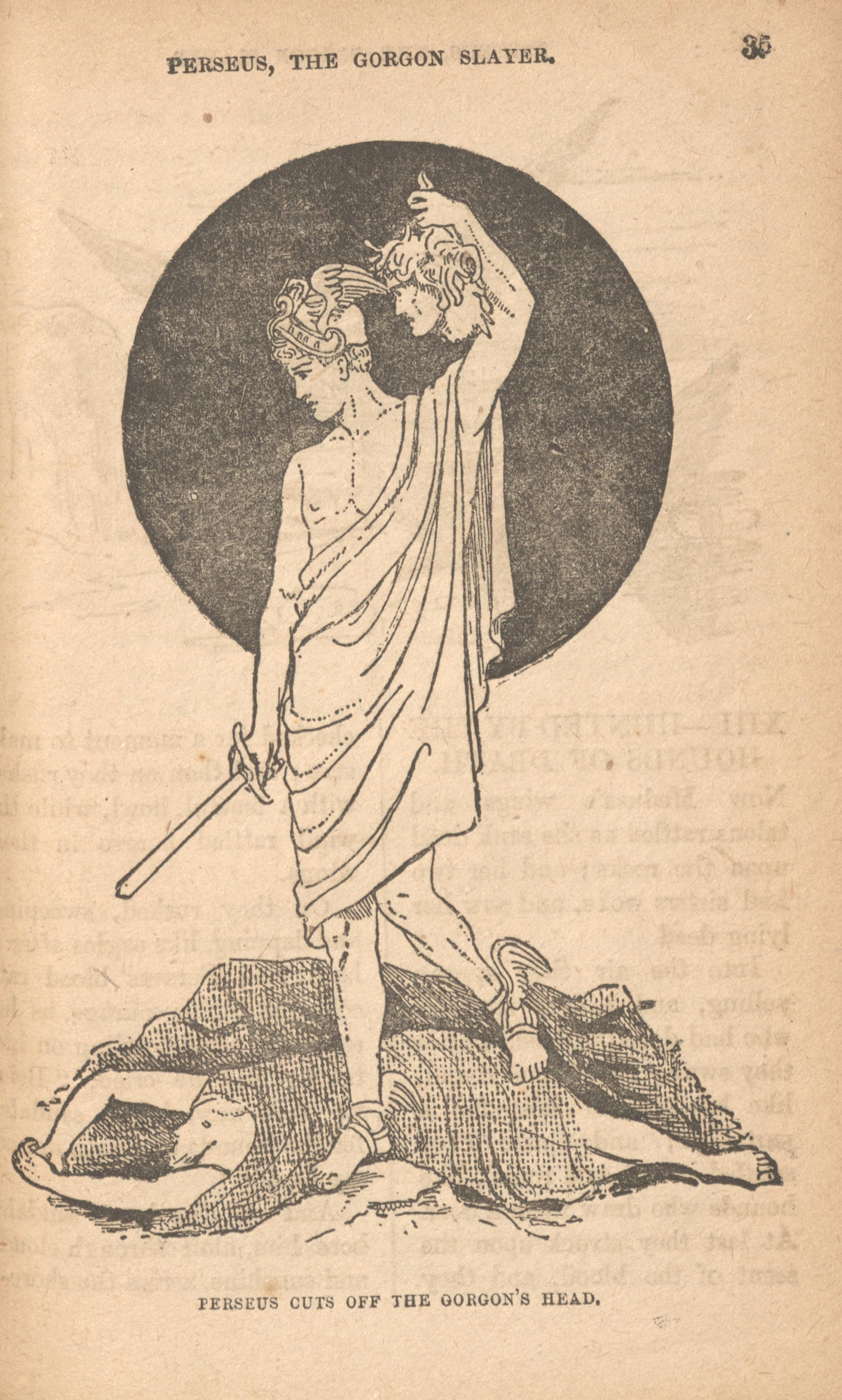
Perseus standing on top of the Gorgon, holding her head, after slaying it off with his sword, extracted from the original book

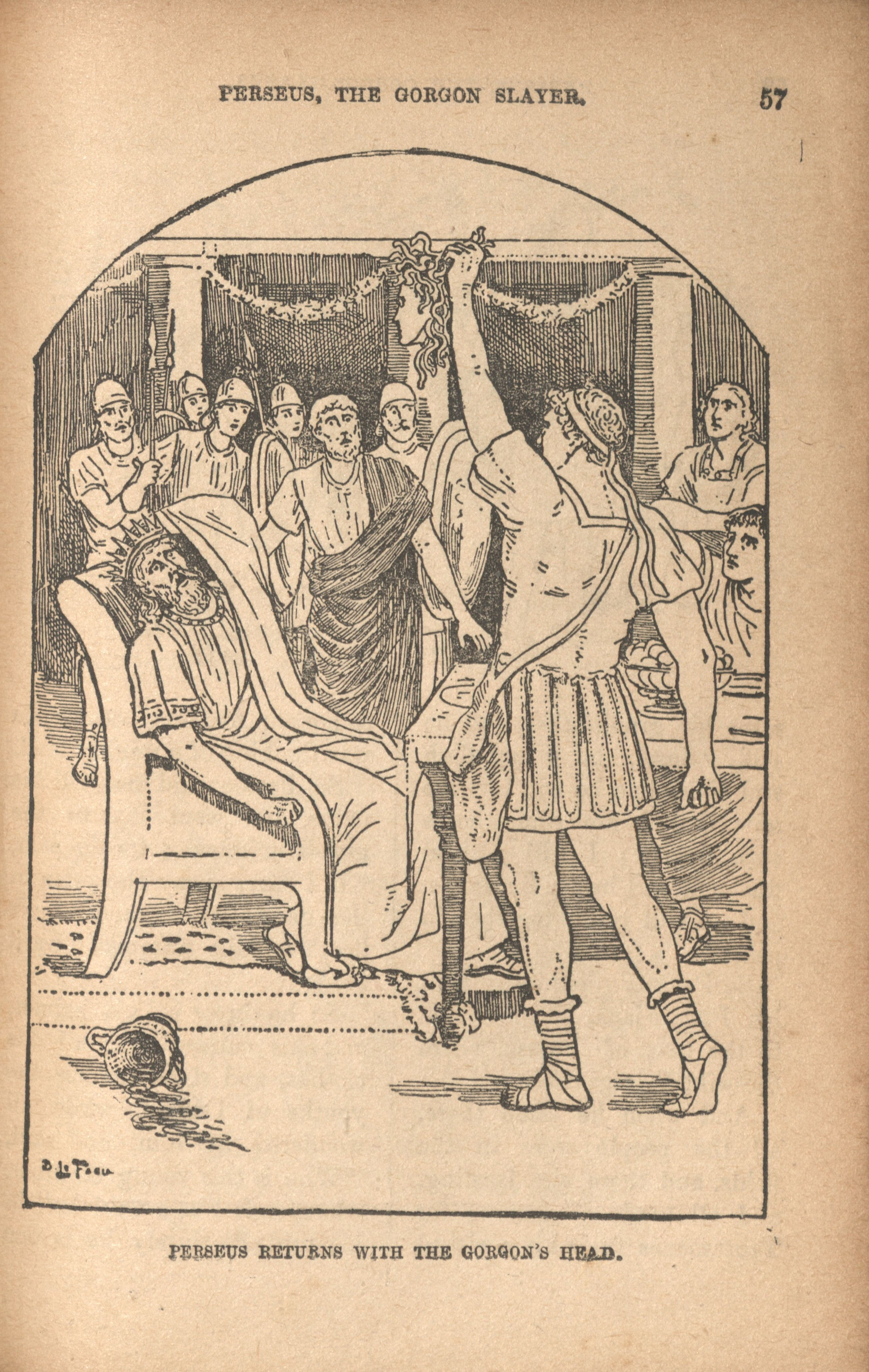
Page from the book

The Story of Perseus and the Gorgon’s Head is a short novel published in 1898 for the series Books for the Bairns. The story was edited by W.T. Stead and taken from Charles Kingsley, who originally wrote the story with the name Perseus, the Gorgon Slayer and published it in his book The Heroes, or Greek fairy tales in 1855.

== Context ==
Charles Kingsley originally wrote about several old Greek Fairy Tales in his book The Heroes, or Greek fairy tales. The book contains the mythical stories of Perseus, Theseus and Jason, and the Argonauts specifically. He wrote about the Greek myths to make the stories available in the English language, as the stories are written in Greek in their original form. The book was meant not to be used for educational purposes, but rather to entertain and to make the tales more approachable to children as in the 19th century Greek mythology was mainly looked at to observe its influence on poetry and literature. Next to Kingsley, Nathaniel Hawthorne and Thomas Bulfinch contributed to making Greek mythology more approachable to children as well.

Stead created a series of books called Books for the Bairns with the goal of making literature available to the broad public by providing books at an affordable price. Before that, Stead had started other initiatives such a Penny Poets with same goal. In contrast to Penny Poets, the series Books for the Bairns was created specifically for children. The Northern English word Bairns and means children. The stories covered in the Books for the Bairns are supposed to be simple stories and meant for silent home reading. The illustrations were created by Brinsley Le Fanu and were included to make sure that children who couldn't read yet were able to understand the tales. In his illustrations for the Book for the Bairns series, Brinsley Le Fanu combines the realistic spirit of the Victorian era with the fantastic nature of the stories. The illustrations are kept simple, and the cover of each book is used to represent one or two of its main characters.

Stead decided to publish the myth of Perseus in the Books for the Bairns after the publication of another Greek myth (i.e., Hercules the Strong) resonated with the public. The book was published by the office Review of Reviews, which was founded by Stead and opened in 1890. In doing so Stead contributed further to making Greek mythology more available to children.

== Contents ==
The book has 60 pages in twenty chapters. The myth's content can be divided into the following five parts:

- Part I: “How Perseus and his mother came to Seriphos”
- Part II: “How Perseus vowed a rash vow”
- Part III: “How Perseus slew the Gorgon"
- Part IV: "How Perseus came to Aethiops"
- Part V: "How Perseus came home again"

The protagonist of the story is Perseus, a young man, who is the son of Zeus and Danae and the grandson of Acrisius. Acrisius is the father of Danae. The myth begins with Acrisius receiving the prophecy that his own grandson will kill him one day. Consequently, Acrisius locks up Danae, so she could not bear him a grandson. Despite the precautions, Zeus, who was very much in love with Danae, impregnated her. Danae and her son, Perseus, were set out on a river by Acrisius to keep Perseus away from him. Stranded in a land called Seriphos, they were found by old and friendly fishermen named Dictys.

On Seriphos, Perseus grows up to be a strong and handsome young man. In his dreams, the Pallas Athene appears to him and asks him if he wants to be either a noble or a mediocre man. Perseus affirms that he wants to be a noble and grand man. One evening Perseus attends a party of Polydectes, the grim and dreadful brother of Dictys, without bringing any gifts like all other attendees. As Polydectes does not have a lot of sympathy for Perseus, he takes the lack of a present badly and confronts Perseus. The night ends with Perseus' vow to bring him the Gorgon's head to make up for his behavior.

Perseus begins a journey to get the Gorgon's head and with the help of many others, such as Pallas Athene, Hermes, Atlas the Giant, the three Gray Sisters, and the Nymphs, manages to kill the Gorgon bravely and fearlessly.

On his way back home, Perseus comes across a maiden chained to a rock, destined to be eaten by a dreadful sea monster. But when he sees her, Perseus falls in love with Andromeda and saves her. After he stones the sea monster with the Gorgon's head the couple goes to Aethiops, where Perseus is offered half of the kingdom by Cepheus, the father of Andromeda.

After that, Perseus finally returns home, seven years after his journey began. When he arrives at the palace of Polydectes he stones him with the Gorgon's head and gives the kingdom of Seriphos to Dictys. Hearing of his brave actions, Acrisius begins to accept his grandson. On the day of the Games of the Olympus Perseus, who is the strongest and most skilled of them all, participates and wins many crowns. But when he throws the disc for his eighth crown, the disc strays and kills Acrisius, fulfilling the prophecy that started the tale.

== Reception ==
The series Book for the Bairns was later on also called and known as The Masterpiece Library or The Masterpiece Library. Series III. The series was a commercial success and eventually published in other countries, such as France, and in similar versions in the United States and Australia. Most of the stories in the series involve morals, and with the series being a success the stories have been widely used in the education of children in the 19th and 20th century.

Besides writing about Greek mythology, Stead engaged in other forms of journalism, and his other works were characterized by a progressive humanitarian approach. Stead was often described as having an unconventional personality and is also said to have made large contributions to contemporary investigative journalism. Notably, Stead, who is often described as innovative, was the first editor to employed women. As Stead held strong liberal and pacifist political beliefs, his works often reflect that; for instance, he largely reported about the Hague Peace Conferences of 1899 and 1907. By publishing the Greek myth, Stead aimed to take an educational role, in demonstrating morals and values to the children reading the stories.
