= Peristhenes =

Peristhenes (/pəˈrɪsθəˌniːz/; Ancient Greek: Περισθένης, romanized: Peristhénēs, lit. 'exceeding strong' or 'mighty'), in Greek mythology, may refer to:

- Peristhenes, an Egyptian prince as one of the sons of King Aegyptus. His mother was the naiad Caliadne and thus full brother of Eurylochus, Phantes, Hermus, Dryas, Potamon, Cisseus, Lixus, Imbrus, Bromius, Polyctor and Chthonius. In some accounts, he could be a son of Aegyptus either by Eurryroe, daughter of the river-god Nilus, or Isaie, daughter of King Agenor of Tyre. Peristhenes suffered the same fate as his other brothers, save Lynceus, when they were slain on their wedding night by their wives who obeyed the command of their father King Danaus of Libya. He married the Danaid Electra, daughter of Danaus and the naiad Polyxo.
- Peristhenes, son of Damastor and grandson of the elder Nauplius. By Androthoe, daughter of Pericastor, he was father of the fisherman Dictys and Polydectes, king of Seriphos. Otherwise, these two sons were called the children of Magnes and an unnamed naiad or of Poseidon and Cerebia.
