= Cerebia =

In Greek mythology, Cerebia (Ancient Greek: Κερεβια) was the mother of the fisherman Dictys and Polydectes, king of Seriphos by the sea-god Poseidon. Otherwise, the parents of these sons were Magnes and an unnamed naiad or of Peristhenes and Androthoe, daughter of Pericastor.
