= Androthoe =

Greek mythological figure

In Greek mythology, Androthoe (/ænˈdrɒθəʊiː/; Ancient Greek: Ἀνδροθόη, romanized: Androthóē, lit. 'swift man', 'swift warrior' or 'she who runs as fast as a man') was the daughter of Pericastor and wife of Peristhenes, son of Damastor. By the latter she became the mother of the fisherman Dictys and Polydectes, king of Seriphos. Otherwise, these two sons were called the children of Magnes and an unnamed naiad or of Poseidon and Cerebia.
