= Thyia =

Thyia may refer to:

- Thyia (mythology)
- Thyia (naiad)
- Thyia of Thessaly
