= Cychreus =

Figure in Greek mythology

In Greek mythology, Cychreus (Ancient Greek: Κυχρεύς) was a legendary king of Salamis Island. He was the son of the god Poseidon and the nymph Salamis. Various accounts describe Cychreus as a figure associated with serpentine symbolism: in some versions, he fought a dragon or serpent named Cychreides that was terrorizing the island; in others, he raised a serpent as a pet or was himself called "the dragon" for his fierce temperament.

Cychreus is linked to both the mythology of Salamis Island and early Athenian traditions, where he became part of Athens's cultural and political narrative. His legacy includes connections with the founding myths of Athens and later figures, her daughter, Periboea, married Telamon and bore him a son, Ajax the Great. Athenian leaders, such as Solon and Themistocles, referenced Cychreus to reinforce claims over Salamis, and a sanctuary dedicated to him was reportedly established there.

== Mythology ==
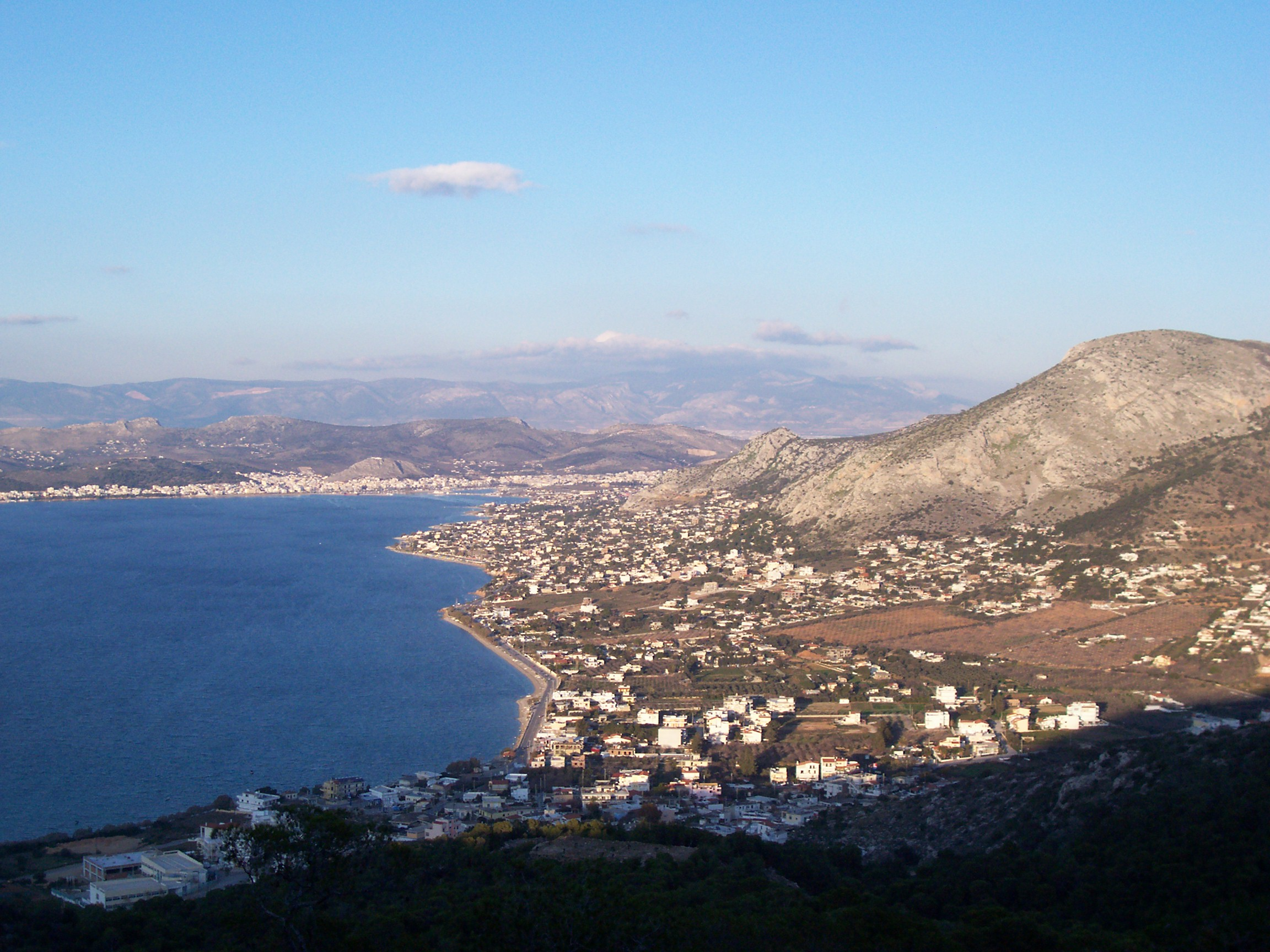
Salamis Island where Cychreus once ruled as king

Cychreus was considered a significant figure in the mythology of Salamis, an island near Athens. He was the son of Poseidon and the nymph Salamis. According to various myths, Cychreus had close ties with serpentine symbolism, which is central to his character in several ways:

- Fought a dragon or serpent, Cychreides, that was terrorizing the island of Salamis, and upon slaying it was made king.
- Raised a dragon or serpent, Cychreides, as a pet, which later caused havoc on the island. It was eventually captured or driven away by Eurylochus, who gave it to Demeter, who then kept it for her own.
- Was known as "the dragon" for his short tempered nature, and terrorized the island of Salamis until driven off by Eurylochus. He was received at Eleusis by Demeter, where he served as her high priest.

== Athens ==
Cychreus’s mythology holds particular significance for Athens, which laid cultural and political claims to the island of Salamis during the Archaic and Classical periods. His story became part of Athens’s ideological narrative, with Athenian leaders using his myth to strengthen their connection to Salamis.

Athenian lawmaker Solon, who wanted to annex Salamis from Megara, sought guidance from the oracle at Delphi. Following the oracle’s instructions, Solon made sacrifices to Cychreus and other local heroes of Salamis. This ritualized invocation of Cychreus provided a divine endorsement of Athens’s territorial expansion, as well as framed the annexation as a restoration of shared cultural heritage.

During the Greco-Persian Wars, Themistocles invoked Cychreus in the buildup to the Battle of Salamis. According to the historian Herodotus, a serpent—interpreted as a manifestation of Cychreus—appeared on the Athenian ships. The apparition was taken as a favorable omen, which boosted the morale of Athenian forces before the battle. Themistocles later established a sanctuary for Cychreus on Salamis.

Cychreus's legacy was integrated into genealogy and linked to figures such as Telamon, a hero who was sometimes said to be Cychreus’s successor on Salamis. In some versions, Telamon, after fleeing from Aegina, married Cychreus's daughter, Glauce, and became king of Salamis. Through this marriage, Telamon’s son Ajax the Great, a hero of the Trojan War, was also connected to Cychreus.
