= Lixus =

Lixus may refer to:

- Lixus (ancient city), a Phoenician city in Morocco
- Lixus (beetle), a genus of true weevils
- Lixus (mythology), in Greek mythology, a son of Aegyptus and Caliadne
