= Hermus =

Various figures in Greek mythology

In Greek mythology, Hermus or Hermos (Ancient Greek: Ἕρμος) is a name attributed to multiple characters:

- Hermus, god of the river Hermus (modern Gediz river) located in the Aegean region of Lydia (modern Turkey). Like most of the river-gods, he was the son of Oceanus and Tethys. Hermus was the father of the Lydian nymphs.
- Hermus, an Egyptian prince as one of the sons of King Aegyptus. His mother was the naiad Caliadne and thus full brother of Eurylochus, Phantes, Peristhenes, Dryas, Potamon, Cisseus, Lixus, Imbrus, Bromius, Polyctor and Chthonius. In some accounts, he could be a son of Aegyptus either by Eurryroe, daughter of the river-god Nilus, or Isaie, daughter of King Agenor of Tyre. Hermus suffered the same fate as his other brothers, save Lynceus, when they were slain on their wedding night by their wives who obeyed the command of their father King Danaus of Libya. He married the Danaid Cleopatra, daughter of Danaus and the naiad Polyxo.
- Hermus, a nobleman of Athens and a companion of Theseus. When Theseus founded the city of Pythopolis, he left Hermus there. A place in Pythopolis called the House of Hermes was named after him, incorrectly changing the name to that of a god.
