= Cisseus =

Greek mythological King

In Greek mythology, Cisseus (Ancient Greek: Κισσεύς, romanized: Kisseus, lit. 'ivy-crowned' or 'wreathe with ivy') may refer to the following personages:

- Cisseus, an Egyptian prince as one of the sons of King Aegyptus. His mother was the naiad Caliadne and thus full brother of Eurylochus, Phantes, Peristhenes, Hermus, Potamon, Dryas, Lixus, Imbrus, Bromius, Polyctor and Chthonius. In some accounts, he could be a son of Aegyptus either by Eurryroe, daughter of the river-god Nilus, or Isaie, daughter of King Agenor of Tyre. Cisseus suffered the same fate as his other brothers, save Lynceus, when they were slain on their wedding night by their wives who obeyed the command of their father King Danaus of Libya. He married the Danaid Antheleia, daughter of Danaus and the naiad Polyxo.
- Cisseus, a Thracian king and father of Theano, the wife of Antenor, as related in Homer's Iliad. His wife was Telecleia, a daughter of King Ilus of Troy. No mythographer (Homer included) provides any further details about this Cisseus, although Strabo suggests that he was associated with the town of Cissus in western Thrace (later Macedonia). Hecabe (Hecuba), the wife of Priam, is sometimes given as a daughter of Cisseus; but she is more usually described as a Phrygian, and daughter of King Dymas. Cisseus was remembered for giving Anchises a bowl engraved with figures as a memento and a pledge of their friendship.
- Cisseus, son of Melampus and an ally of Turnus, the man who opposed Aeneas in Italy. He was killed by Aeneas.
- Cisseus, also the name of a local king, defeated by Macedonians, Perdiccas, Caranus and Archelaus in various versions of the myth. He received Archelaus and promised to give him his kingdom and his daughter but later, going back on his word, tried to kill him. But Archelaus, who is counted among the Heraclides, killed Cisseus instead.
