= Potamon (mythology) =

In Greek mythology, Potamon (Ancient Greek: Ποτάμων means "river, stream") was an Egyptian prince as one of the sons of King Aegyptus.

== Family ==
Potamon's mother was the naiad Caliadne and thus full brother of Eurylochus, Peristhenes, Hermus, Dryas, Phantes, Cisseus, Lixus, Imbrus, Bromius, Polyctor and Chthonius. In some accounts, he could be a son of Aegyptus either by Eurryroe, daughter of the river-god Nilus, or Isaie, daughter of King Agenor of Tyre.

== Mythology ==
Potamon suffered the same fate as his other brothers, save Lynceus, when they were slain on their wedding night by their wives who obeyed the command of their father King Danaus of Libya. He married the Danaid Glaucippe, daughter of Danaus and the naiad Polyxo.
