= Dryas (mythology) =

Several characters with the same name

Dryas (Ancient Greek: Δρύας, gen.: Δρύαντος, lit. 'from δρῦς oak') is the name of several figures in Greek mythology, including:

- Dryas, an Egyptian prince as one of the sons of King Aegyptus. His mother was the naiad Caliadne and thus full brother of Eurylochus, Phantes, Peristhenes, Hermus, Potamon, Cisseus, Lixus, Imbrus, Bromius, Polyctor and Chthonius. In some accounts, he could be a son of Aegyptus either by Eurryroe, daughter of the river-god Nilus, or Isaie, daughter of King Agenor of Tyre. Dryas suffered the same fate as his other brothers, save Lynceus, when they were slain on their wedding night by their wives who obeyed the command of their father King Danaus of Libya. He married the Danaid Hecabe or Eurydice, daughter of Danaus and the naiad Polyxo.
- Dryas, a Thracian prince as son of King Lycurgus, king of the Edoni in Thrace. He was killed when Lycurgus went insane and mistook him for a mature trunk of ivy, a plant holy to the god Dionysus, whose cult Lycurgus was attempting to extirpate.
- Dryas, father of the aforementioned Lycurgus, and thus grandfather of the above Dryas.
- Dryas, a leader of the Lapiths against the Centaurs, and a participant of the battle that began at the wedding of Pirithous and Hippodamia, where he killed the Centaur Rhoetus, who had killed his fellow Lapiths Corythus and Euagrus just before that. In Iliad 1, Nestor numbers Dryas among an earlier generation of heroes of his youth, "the strongest men that Earth has bred, the strongest men against the strongest enemies, a savage mountain-dwelling tribe [i. e. the Centaurs] whom they utterly destroyed", and call him "shepherd of the people". No trace of such an oral tradition, which Homer's listeners would have recognized in Nestor's allusion, survived in literary epic.
- Dryas, son of Ares or of Iapetus.
- Dryas the seer, father of Munichus.
- Dryas, one of the suitors of Pallene, daughter of Sithon. He was killed by Cleitus, who then went on to marry Pallene.
- Dryas, father of Amphilochus, the husband of Alcinoe.
- Dryas, son of Orion, a chieftain from Tanagra. He brought 1000 archers with him to defend Thebes in the Seven against Thebes. Ares made use of the fact that Dryas shared his father's hate of Artemis and her followers, and turned him against Parthenopaeus and his Arcadian contingent. Upon killing Parthenopaeus, Dryas was himself felled by an unknown hand.
- Dryas, a Greek warrior killed during the Trojan War by Deiphobus.
