= Chione (daughter of Callirrhoe) =

Character in Greek mythology

In Greek mythology, Chione or Khionê (Ancient Greek: Χιονη from χιών – chiōn, "snow") was the daughter of the Oceanid Callirrhoe and Nilus. She was raped by a local peasant and transformed into a snow cloud by Hermes at the order of Zeus. From the clouds she cast snow (khiôn) upon the desert. The Greek word for snow (χιών chiōn) was thought to have come from her name.
