= Pericastor =

Character in Greek mythology

In Greek mythology, Pericastor (/ˈpɛr.ɪˌkæs.tɔːr/; Ancient Greek: Περικάστωρ, romanized: Perikastor) was the father of Androthoe who married Peristhenes and became the mother of the fisherman Dictys and Polydectes, king of Seriphos. Otherwise, nothing is known about him.
