= Polyctor =

In Greek mythology, Polyctor (Ancient Greek: Πολύκτωρ, romanized: Polyktor, lit. 'possessor of many things' or 'much-possessing') may refer to the following figures:

- Polyctor, an Egyptian prince as one of the sons of King Aegyptus. His mother was the naiad Caliadne and thus full brother of Eurylochus, Phantes, Peristhenes, Hermus, Potamon, Dryas, Lixus, Imbrus, Bromius, Cisseus and Chthonius. In some accounts, he could be a son of Aegyptus either by Eurryroe, daughter of the river-god Nilus, or Isaie, daughter of King Agenor of Tyre. Polyctor suffered the same fate as his other brothers, save Lynceus, when they were slain on their wedding night by their wives who obeyed the command of their father King Danaus of Libya. He married the Danaid Stygne, daughter of Danaus and the naiad Polyxo.
- Polyctor, son of King Pterelaus of the Teleboans and Amphimede, and a descendant of Zeus. Originally from Cephallenia, Polyctor together with his brothers Neritus and Ithacus decided to leave their homeland to preserve their own way of life. They were drawn to a nearby island, choosing it as the perfect site for a new colony because of its towering mountains offered excellent natural protection. After establishing their settlement, the local geography was named in their honour: the island itself became Ithaca, named after Ithacus; the prominent peak nearby was named Mount Neritus, after Neritus; and a third landmark, Polyctorium, took its name from Polyctor himself. These brothers were also said to have made a basin of stone in Ithaca into which a spring ran. He had a son Pisander, who was one of the suitors of Penelope.
- In Homer's Iliad, Hermes takes the guise of a young mortal man when he is sent to keep Priam safe during his embassy to Achilles, and claims to be the son of a certain Polyctor.
