= Damastor =

In Greek mythology, the name Damastor (/dəˈmæstɔːr/; Ancient Greek: Δαμάστωρ, romanized: Damástōr or Damastôr, lit. 'tamer' or 'subduer') may refer to:

- Damastor, a Giant. During the Gigantomachy, he used a rock into which a fellow Giant Pallas had been changed as a throwing weapon.
- Damastor, a son of Nauplius, father of Peristhenes and through him grandfather of Dictys and Polydectes.
- Damastor, father of a defender of Troy, Tlepolemus.
- Damastor, father of Agelaus, one of the Suitors of Penelope.
- Damastor, another Suitor of Penelope who came from Dulichium along with other 56 wooers. He, with the other suitors, was shot dead by Odysseus with the help of Eumaeus, Philoetius, and Telemachus.

The patronymic Damastorides "son of Damastor" is used in reference to Agelaus and Tlepolemus but also to an otherwise unnamed defender of Troy killed by Agamemnon.

- Damastor, A Dark Fantasy novel by Dimitri Iatrou.
