= Chthonius =

Various figures in Greek mythology

In Greek mythology, the name Chthonius (/ˈθoʊniəs/; Ancient Greek: Χθόνιος, romanized: Chthonios, lit. 'belonging to the earth, the ground, the underworld', [kʰtʰó.ni.os]) may refer to:

- Chthonius, an Egyptian prince as one of the sons of King Aegyptus. His mother was the naiad Caliadne and thus full brother of Eurylochus, Phantes, Peristhenes, Hermus, Potamon, Dryas, Lixus, Imbrus, Bromius, Cisseus and Polyctor. In some accounts, he could be a son of Aegyptus either by Eurryroe, daughter of the river-god Nilus, or Isaie, daughter of King Agenor of Tyre. Chthonius suffered the same fate as his other brothers, save Lynceus, when they were slain on their wedding night by their wives who obeyed the command of their father King Danaus of Libya. He married the Danaid Bryce, daughter of Danaus and the naiad Polyxo.
- Chthonius, one of the five surviving Spartoi or men that grew forth from the dragon's teeth which Cadmus sowed at Thebes. The other four Spartoi were Hyperenor, Pelorus, Udaeus and Echion. Chthonius was the father of Lycus and Nycteus (but see Hyrieus).
- Chthonius, son of Poseidon and Syme, who founded the first colony on the island of Syme, which was named after his mother.
- Chthonius, a Centaur who was killed by Nestor at the wedding of Pirithous and Hippodamia.
- Chthonius, one of the Gigantes.
- Chthonius, an epithet of several major gods, including Hades, Hermes, Dionysus. and Zeus. See Chthonia for goddesses bearing the feminine version of the epithet.

Chthonius is also a genus of pseudoscorpions:

- Chthonius (arachnid)
