= Callirhoe (Oceanid) =

Oceanid of Greek mythology

In Greek mythology, Callirhoe (Ancient Greek: Καλλιρρόη, romanized: Kallirhóē, lit. 'beautiful flow, stream') was one of the Oceanids, daughters of the Titans: Oceanus and Tethys.

== Family ==
Callirhoe had consorted with Chrysaor, Neilus, Poseidon and Manes. By Chrysaor, she became the mother of the monsters Geryon and Echidna while Chione was her daughter by the river-god of Egypt, Neilus. Meanwhile, to Poseidon, Callirhoe bore Minyas, founder of Minyan Orchomenus, and to Manes, Cotys, a king of Maeonia.

== Mythology ==
Callirhoe was among the Oceanids who accompanied Persephone when the daughter of Demeter was abducted by the lord of the dead, Hades.

== Legacy ==
Jupiter's moon Callirrhoe is named after her.
