= Caliadne =

Naiad, wife of Aegyptus

Caliadne (/kæliˈædniː/; Ancient Greek: Καλιάδνη) or Caliadna, in Greek mythology, was a naiad of the river Nile, presumably one of the daughters of the river-god Nilus. She was one of the wives of King Aegyptus of Egypt, bearing him twelve sons: Eurylochus, Phantes, Peristhenes, Hermus, Dryas, Potamon, Cisseus, Lixus, Imbrus, Bromios, Polyctor, and Chthonios. These sons married and were murdered by the daughters of her sister Polyxo and King Danaus of Libya during their wedding night.

According to Hippostratus, Aegyptus had his progeny by a single woman called Eurryroe, daughter of the river-god Nilus. In some accounts, he consorted with his cousin Isaie, daughter of Agenor, king of Tyre.
