= Eurylochus (mythology) =

Greek mythological figures

In Greek mythology, Eurylochus or Eurylochos (/jəˈrɪləkəs/; Ancient Greek: Εὐρύλοχος) may refer to the following characters:

- Eurylochus, one of the comrades of the Greek hero Odysseus.
- Eurylochus, an Egyptian prince as one of the sons of King Aegyptus. His mother was the naiad Caliadne and thus full brother of Phantes, Peristhenes, Hermus, Dryas, Potamon, Cisseus, Lixus, Imbrus, Bromius, Polyctor and Chthonius. In some accounts, he could be a son of Aegyptus either by Eurryroe, daughter of the river-god Nilus, or Isaie, daughter of King Agenor of Tyre. Eurylochus suffered the same fate as his other brothers, save Lynceus, when they were slain on their wedding night by their wives who obeyed the command of their father King Danaus of Libya. He married the Danaid Autonoe, daughter of Danaus and the naiad Polyxo.
- Eurylochus, a Salaminian hero who drove out the dragon Cychreides on the isle of Salamis. The said serpent was later on welcomed to Eleusis by Demeter and made her attendant. According to other traditions, Eurylochus instead expelled Cychreus, who was called a dragon on account of his savage nature, from the island. Cychreus was received by Demeter at Eleusis, and appointed a priest to her temple.
- Eurylochus, one of the suitors of Penelope who came from Zacynthus along with other 43 wooers. He, with the other suitors, was slain by Odysseus with the help of Eumaeus, Philoetius, and Telemachus.
