= Euthenia =

Ancient Greek female spirit of prosperity

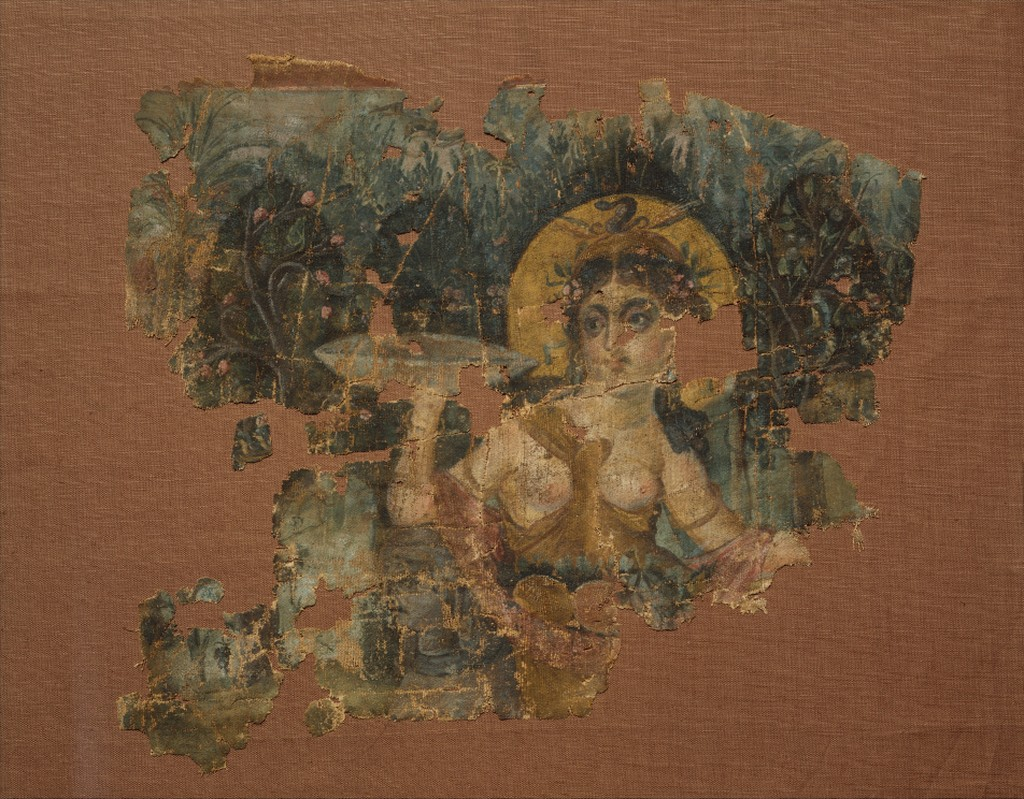
Euthenia depicted in a garden, tempera on linen wall hanging (first century AD), Metropolitan Museum of Art 1984.178.

Euthenia (Ancient Greek: Eὐθηνια) was the Greek name for a personification of abundance. As the Greek equivalent of either of the Roman goddesses Annona or Abundantia, she appeared on the coinage of Roman Imperial Egypt. She was associated with Nilus, the Greek god of the Nile, and was syncretized with the Egyptian goddess Isis. There are no ancient literary sources for the goddess. She is known almost entirely from her iconography.

== Role ==
Euthenia was, from the reign of the Roman emperors Augustus through Commodus, the Greek name used for a deified personification of abundance, particularly the abundance of wheat associated with the flooding of the Nile. The Ancient Greek common noun euthenia ("prosperity, plenty, abundance") like the Latin annona, was used to refer to the grain-supply, and the deified personification Euthenia, was used on Roman coins in the Greek East as the Greek equivalent of either of the Roman divine personifications Annona or Abundantia. Here her role seems to have been to associate the abundance of the food supply with Roman rule of Egypt. The management of the food supply in Egypt, and it's magistrate, was called the euthenia and the eutheniarchos, respectively.

She had no mythology or cult of her own. She was considered to be a consort of Nilus, the Greek river god associated with the Nile. Because of the identification of the Egyptian god Osiris with Nilus, Euthenia became syncretized with Osiris's consort Isis.

== Sources ==
All early sources for Euthenia are iconographic. Perhaps the oldest of these is found on the Tazza Farnese (mid-second century to first century BC?), where the syncretized Isis-Euthenia is depicted reclining on a sphinx holding up two ears of wheat in her right hand. Otherwise the oldest sources for Euthenia are found on the Roman Imperial coinage of Augustus in Alexandria Egypt, from the last decade of the first century BC. Euthenia is also named in a votive dedicatory inscription from Anazarbus in Cilicia dated to the first or second century AD.

The only literary source which mentions Euthenia as a personification dates from the fifteenth century AD. A source from the end of the sixth century AD describes the sighting of two gigantic apparitions rising up out of the Nile river, the Nile god itself, and an accompanying unnamed female (Euthenia?).

== Iconography ==
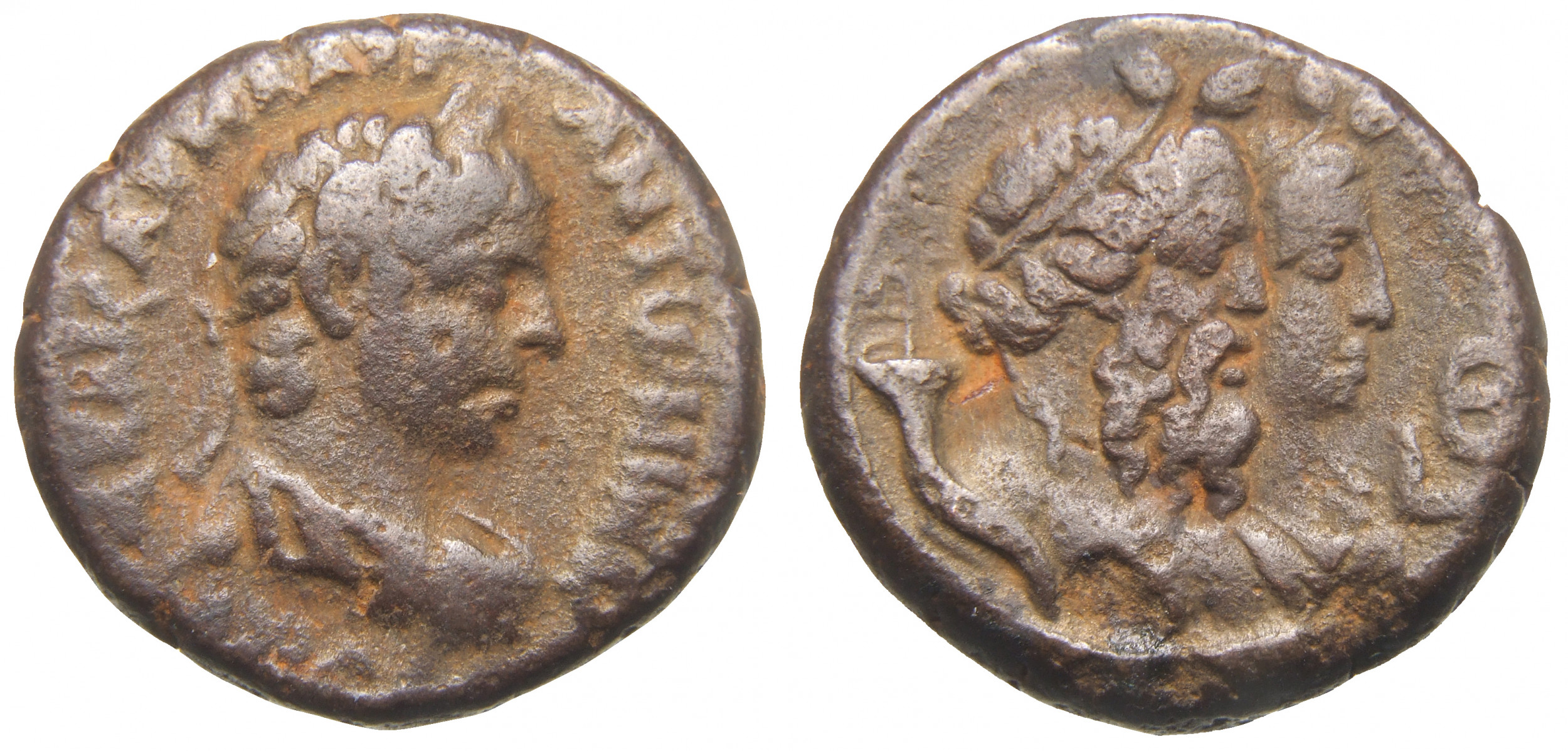
Elagabalus (221/2 AD)

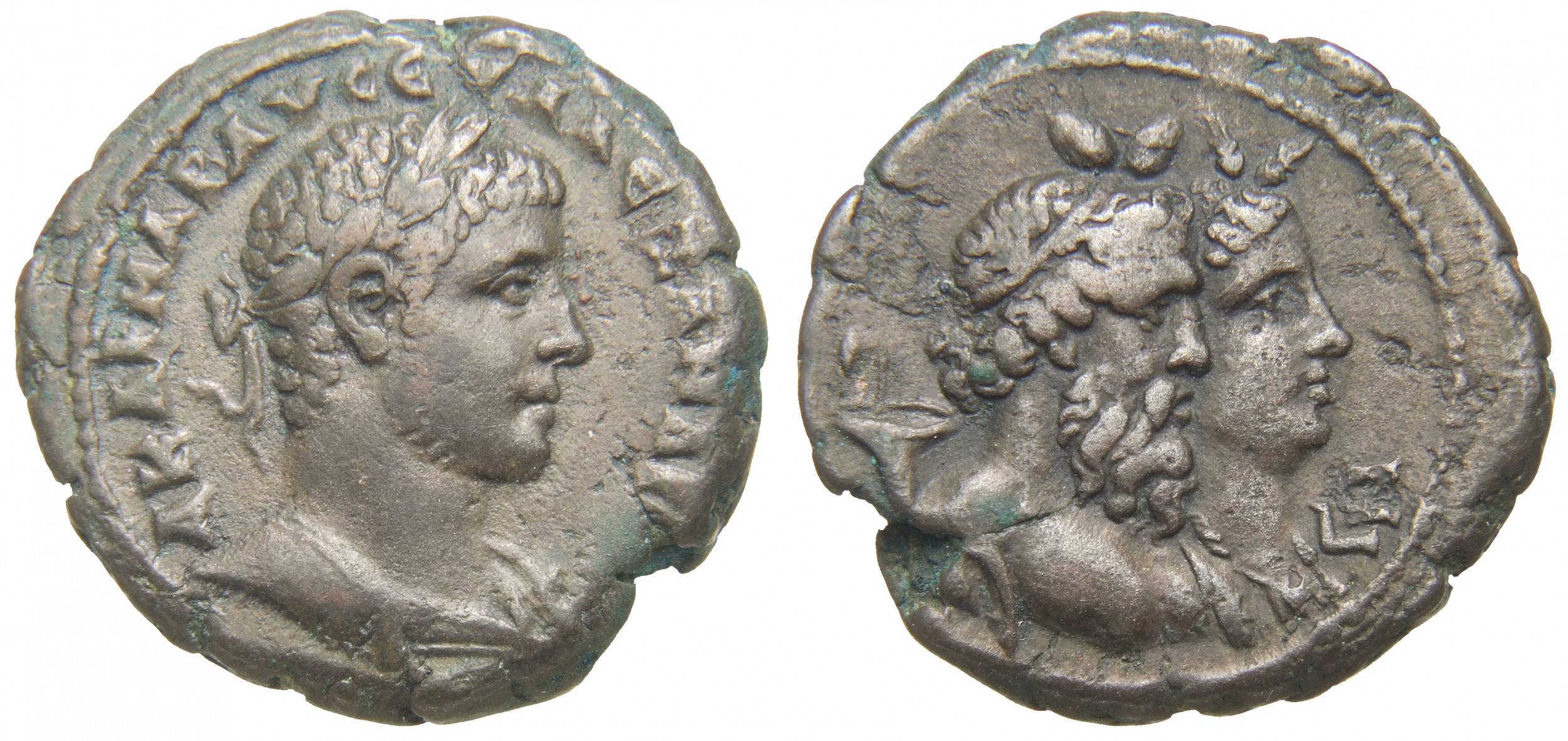
Severus Alexander (227-235 AD)

Two Roman Imperial coins of Alexandria showing the reigning emperor on the obverse and twin busts of Nilus and Euthenia on the reverse.

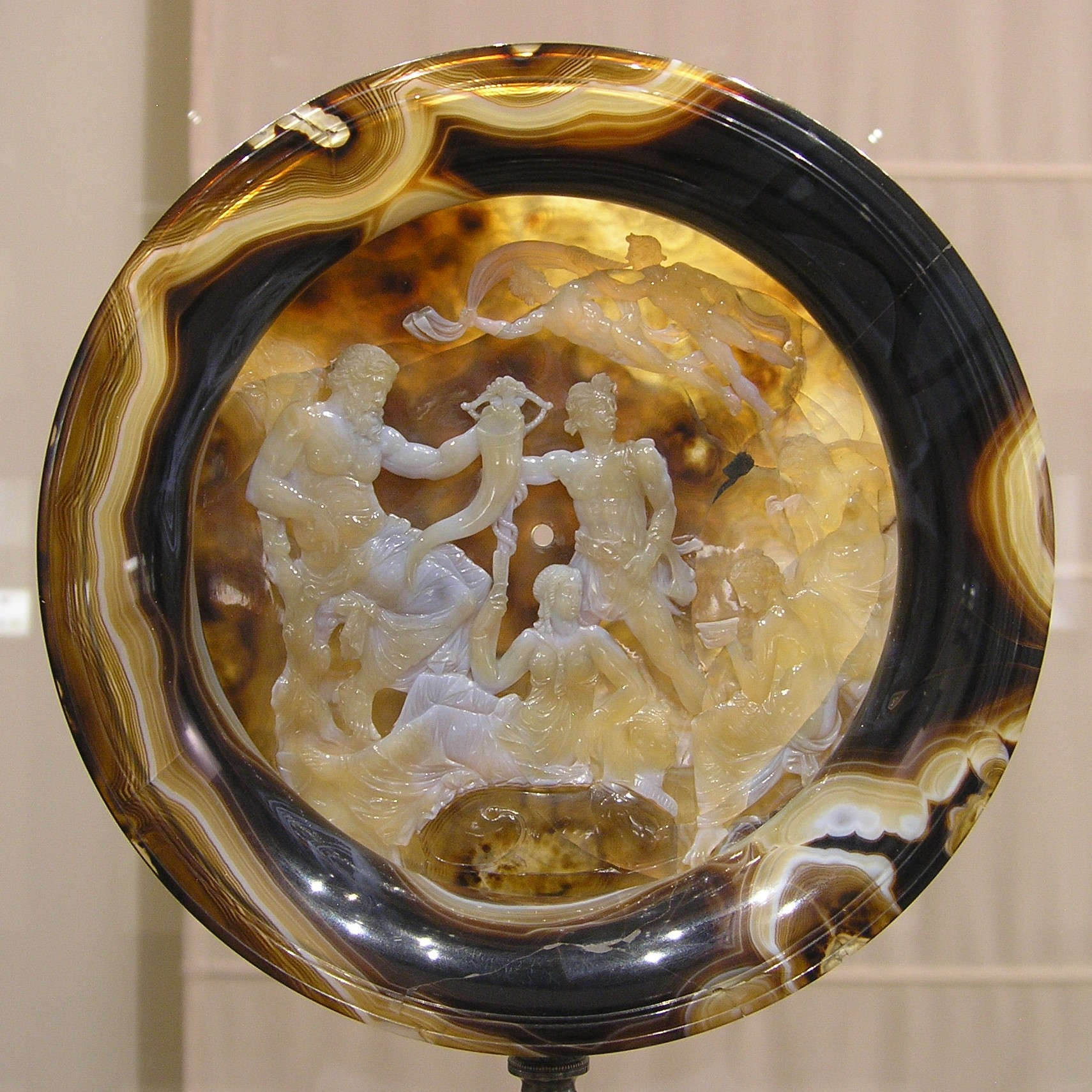
Isis-Euthenia reclining on a sphinx, holding two ears of wheat in her right hand and left forearm resting on the sphinx's head; interior of the Tazza Farnese (mid-second century, or first century BC (?)), Naples, National Archeological Museum 27611.

Representations of Euthenia only occur in Greco-Roman Egypt, and appear primarily on coins, where she can be identified by inscription. She can also be recognized through her association with the god Nilus, where she is always depicted in a subsidiary role. Her attributes are borrowed from other better-known divinities. These include her most characteristic attributes Demeter's ears of wheat (some times mixed with poppies), and Abundantia and Annona's cornucopia, or more rarely Nilus's nilometer, and Isis's sistrum and Isiac knot.

She is usually shown crowned with ears of wheat, and is often depicted reclining or sitting on a Sphinx, or with Nilus, where she can be seen reclining on the ground at his feet, or crowning him, or kneeling before him.

Euthenia was depicted on Alexandrian coinage beginning in the last decade of the first century BC during the reign of Roman emperor Augustus and continued at irregular intervals through the reign of Commodus. In her earliest depictions, on the coins of Augustus, Euthenia appears as a draped female bust in profile, wearing a crown of wheat and holding ears of wheat, and identified by the inscription "ΕΥΘΗΝΙΑ". On coins from Antoninus to Aurelian, twin busts of Euthenia and Nilus appear. On coins of Domitian, Antoninus, Marcus Aurelius and Commodus, she can be seen standing, holding wheat and a cornucopia like Abundantia.

In addition to coins, depictions of Euthenia are also found on several other objects. Perhaps the oldest of these is the Tazza Farnese, where the central female figure shown reclining on a male sphinx has been identified by some scholars as Euthenia. This figure holds two ears of wheat in her raised right hand. She wears "Libyan" corkscrew curls, a diadem headband, and an Isiac knot leaving her breasts bare. She sits at the feet of a seated Nilus on the left, with a third figure standing behind her.

A first or second century wall hanging (see above), thought to be from Akhmim, depicts a reclining Euthenia holding a bowl in her right hand (her left hand no longer visible). As in the Tazza Farnese, she wears an Isiac knot with exposed breasts, as she reclines on a sphinx. In the background is a garden with birds in flight or at rest. Her hair is intertwined with flowers and fruit, with a leafy crown and an Egyptian uraeus ("rearing cobra"), with two ears of wheat on either side, on top, and a halo behind. She wears gold bracelets and earrings.

A second century statue (Alexandria Graeco-Roman Museum 24124) depicts a Euthenia reclining on her left side, holding a cup in her left hand which rests on the head of a sphinx, wearing the characteristic corkscrew curls and Isiac knot. Here she is surrounded by eight putti, the well-known symbols of a cubit of height of the annual Nile inundation.
