= Cychreides =

Cychreides (Ancient Greek: Κυχρείδης) is a fabled dragon, or serpent, from Greek mythology. It is named after Cychreus, the Greek demigod who either raised or killed it, depending on the version of the story being told.

Cychreides (alternatively Kykhreides) was one of the pair of serpent dragons that pulled the Greek goddess Demeter's chariot. This chariot was later gifted to the hero Triptolemus to travel the lands spreading grain, resulting in the death of one of the serpents at the hands of King Charnabon of the Getae, however it is unclear if Cychreides is the serpent that was slain at that time

== Mythology ==
Cychreus, son of Poseidon, either:

- Fought a dragon/serpent that was terrorizing the island of Salamis, and upon slaying it was made king.
- Raised a dragon/serpent as a pet, before he became ruler of Salamis. It went on a rampage, and was driven away or captured by Eurylochus, who gave it to Demeter, a goddess who then kept it for her own.
- Was known as "the dragon" for his hot-headed nature, and terrorized the island of Salamis until driven off by Eurylochus, but was received at Eleusis by Demeter, who made him her high priest.
