= Archelaus (play) =

Lost tragedy by Euripides

- Original language: Ancient Greek
- Written by: Euripides
- Characters: Archelaos, Cisseus, Others
- Genre: Tragedy

Premiere
- Place: Macedonia

Archelaus (Ancient Greek: Ἀρχέλαος, Archelaos) is a drama written and performed in Macedonia by Euripides honouring Archelaus I of Macedon on a par with king Caranus. There is no doubt that Euripides transformed Caranus to Archelaus (meaning "leader of the people") in the play, in an attempt to please Archelaus I of Macedon. In the play, Archelaus son of Temenus was exiled from Argos by his brothers and went to Thrace, to king Cisseus who happened to be at war with neighbouring people and promised Archelaus his kingdom and daughter if he could protect him against the enemies. Archelaus did it and went to ask the king for his promised reward. The king however broke his promise and decided to kill Archelaus by treachery. He therefore gave orders to prepare a pitfall to trap him. But a slave of the king told Archelaus about the plot and the hero asked for a secret interview with the king: when alone he threw him inside the pitfall. He then fled to Macedonia, led by a goat, according to some command of Apollo, and founded the city of Aigai after the goat.

From the main play only fragments have been saved. The works Alcmene, Temenus, Temenidai and Archelaus were part of the Macedonian tetralogy of Euripides.
