= Polydectes =

Mythological Greek king on Seriphos

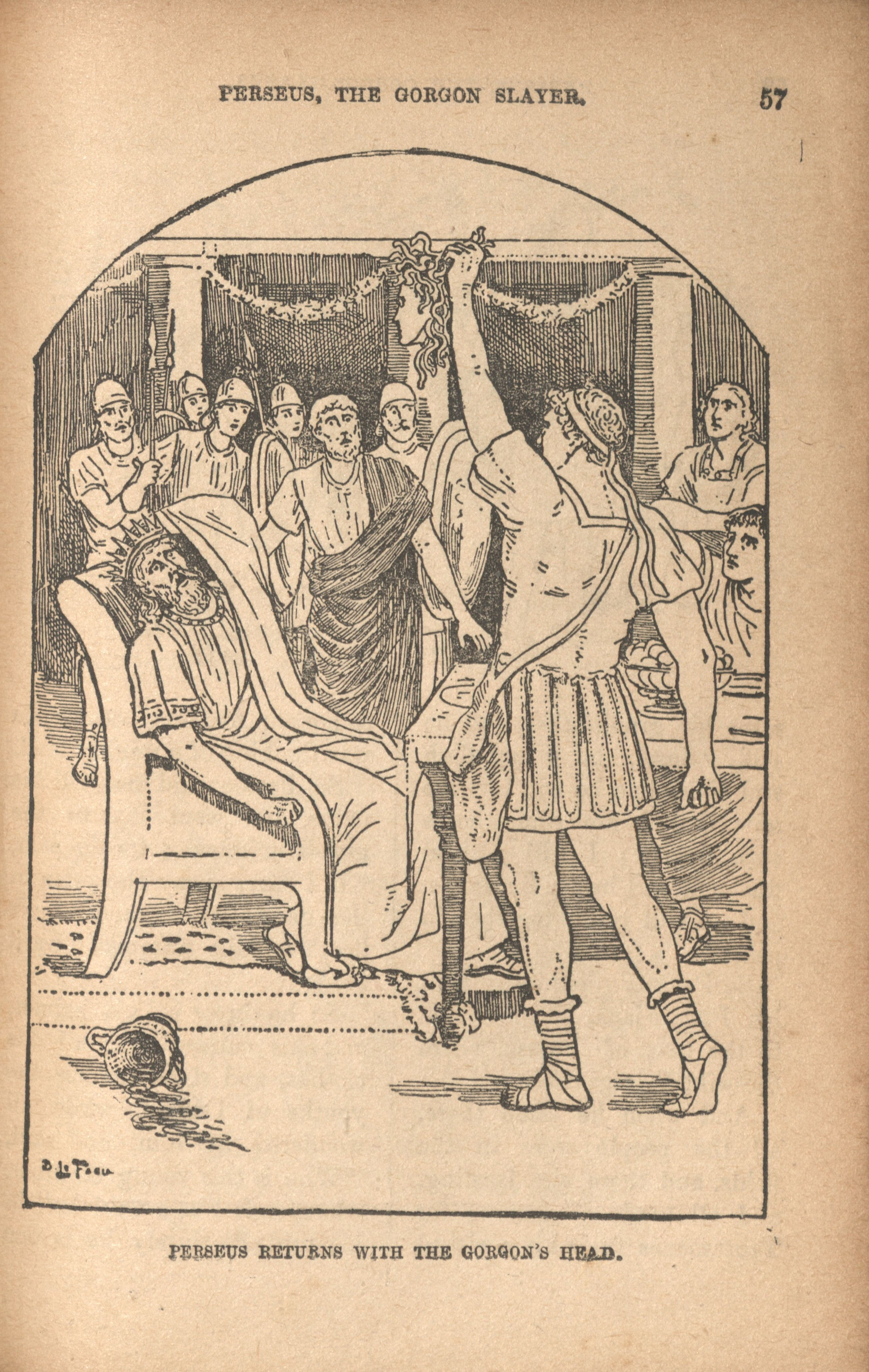
Illustration from the book The Story of Perseus and the Gorgon's Head.

In Greek mythology, King Polydectes (/ˌpɒlɪˈdɛktiːz/; Ancient Greek: Πολυδέκτης, romanized: Poludéktēs, lit. 'receiver of many') is a king of the island of Seriphos in the Cyclades. Polydectes was the ruler of the island when the Argive princess Danaë and her infant son Perseus washed ashore, having been cast away into the sea by Danaë's father Acrisius, who was afraid that his daughter's son would kill him. Polydectes eventually grew enamoured with the beautiful Danaë, but did not dare approach her due to her grown-up son Perseus, so he attempted to get rid of him by sending him to fetch the head of the gorgon Medusa. Polydectes' plan was foiled as Perseus returned victorious, who then used the severed head to petrify Polydectes.

== Family ==
Polydectes was the son of either Magnes and an unnamed naiad, or of Peristhenes and Androthoe, or of Poseidon and Cerebia. His story is largely a part of the myth of Perseus, and runs as follows according to the Bibliotheca and John Tzetzes. He was the brother of the fisherman Dictys, who succeeded him on the throne.

== Mythology ==
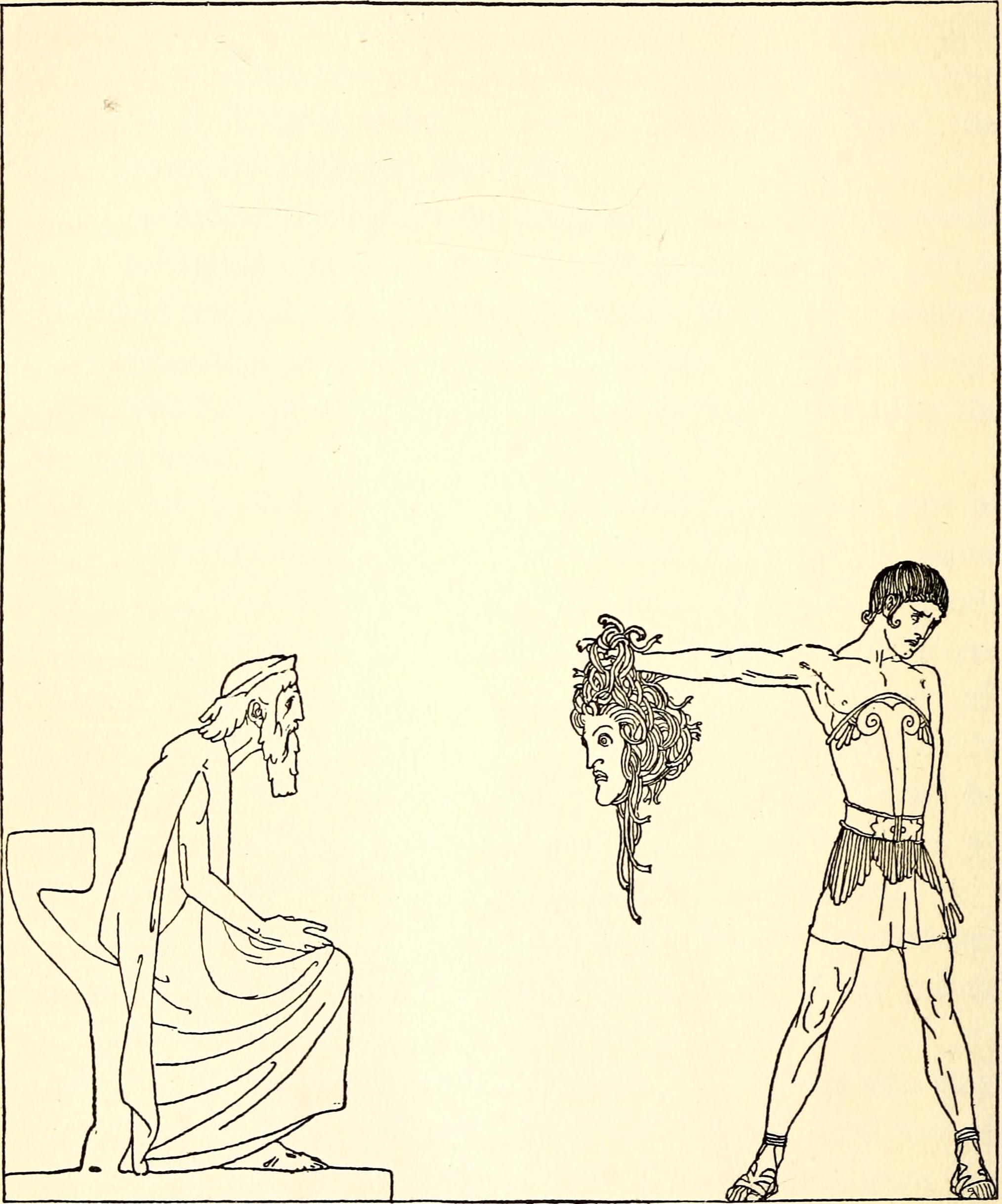
Polydectes Turned Into Stone by Perseus

Polydectes fell in love with Danaë when she and her son Perseus were saved by his brother Dictys (see: Acrisius). Perseus, old enough by the time, was very protective of his mother and would not allow Polydectes near her. Therefore, Polydectes hatched a plot to get him out of the way. Under the pretense that he was going to marry Hippodamia, he ordered every man in Seriphos to supply him with suitable gifts. His friends were to provide horses but Perseus failed to bring any, so Polydectes announced that he wanted nothing more than the head of the Gorgon Medusa, since Perseus had previously said he was up to a task so harsh as fetching a Gorgon's head. Perseus agreed and Polydectes told him that he could not return to the island without it. Perseus slew Medusa, using a shield supplied by Athena as a mirror to avoid looking at the gorgon.

When Perseus returned to Seriphos with the Gorgon's head, he found that, in his absence, his mother was threatened and abused by Polydectes, and had to seek refuge in a temple. Perseus was outraged and strode into the throne room where Polydectes and other nobles were convening. Polydectes was surprised that the hero was still alive and refused to believe Perseus had accomplished the deed he was sent out to do. Perseus protested that he had indeed slain the Gorgon Medusa, and, as proof, revealed her severed head. No sooner had Polydectes and his nobles gazed upon the prize when they were turned to stone. In a version recorded by Hyginus, Polydectes, fearing the courage of Perseus, made a treacherous attempt on his life, and Perseus succeeded in exposing the Gorgon's head just in time. Perseus then handed the kingdom of Seriphos over to Dictys.

In an alternate version followed by Hyginus, Polydectes married Danaë as she was brought to him by Dictys, and had Perseus brought up in a temple of Athena. He did not abuse Perseus and Danae, but rather protected them from Acrisius as the latter discovered that they had survived and arrived at Seriphos to kill them. Perseus eventually swore to never kill his grandfather, but Polydectes soon died and at his funeral games Perseus accidentally hit Acrisius with a discus, which resulted in Acrisius' death.
