= Rape in Greek mythology =

Rape in Greek mythology is a common motif. The struggle to escape from sexual pursuit is one of the most popular motifs of classical mythology. This type of pursuit and struggle could be those of gods assaulting mortals, or mortals upon other mortals, and less commonly also the attacks of mortals upon gods (for example, Ixion's assault of Hera) and gods upon other gods (Poseidon and Demeter, Hephaestus and Athena). Other supernatural beings like satyrs and centaurs were often depicted attacking nymphs and maidens. Greek mythology depicts women as vulnerable to assault, able to escape only through death, or metamorphosis like Daphne who becomes a laurel tree. The consequence of fleeing sexual violence is another type of force on the body, the loss of the human form — women who survive sexual violence become pregnant, and when gods are the rapists, produce a hero child.

== Background ==
Called the Golden Age of Athens, the cultural development of the 5th century BC produced a wealth of art and drama. Froma Zeitlin writes:

"We must also remember that Greek culture is one that already finds the mythic a problematic category when confronted with other modes of apprehending reality. After all, the status of mythic stories of abduction and rape of women as founding events in human culture (such as the abduction of Helen as the cause of the Trojan War) or as acts committed by the very gods who are worshiped as religious powers prove to puzzle, embarrass and scandalize the sensibilities of the Greek themselves as soon as a skeptical or ethical eye is trained on these narratives."

== Theater ==
In Greek drama, rape and seduction are sometimes ambiguous. Helen of Sparta is sometimes raped by Paris, and sometimes seduced. The details depend on the playwright. The scene in Iphigeneia at Aulis (Euripides), taking place before the Trojan War, attempts to generalize the rape of Helen, presenting it as the rape of all women, in support of the pan-Hellenic concept of Greeks against barbarians. Helen becomes a symbol of all Greek women who must be protected from barbarian rapists.

Euripides, in his plays, gives attention to women as victims of war. Clytemnestra, usually depicted as wicked, is humanized, and to an extent, justified, when she addresses her husband in Iphigeneia at Aulis:

You married me against my will and took me by force, having killed my husband; my infant you hurled to the ground having torn it from my breast

Cassandra is shown on stage in Agamemnon, the defeated Trojan, raped at the fall of Troy, clothed in barbaric costume. Clytemnestra comments on her barbaric speech, comparing her to a swallow, a possible reference to Procne, whose husband Tereus raped her sister Philomela and tore out her tongue. The sisters murdered Procne's son in revenge, and Procne became a nightingale whose song sounded like her murdered son's name (Itys). Aeschylus makes other comparisons between Cassandra and Procne later in the play.

Of the drama produced in the Golden Age of Athens era, The Suppliants by Aeschylus opens with the 50 female descendants of Io (who was raped by Zeus) who are forced to marry against their will and raped. They kill their husbands on the eve of their wedding.

In the play Hippolytus by Euripides, Phaedra, stepmother of Hippolytos falsely accuses the protagonist of rape. Hippolytos, son of Hippolyta and Theseus, has previously announced his rejection of Aphrodite and heterosexual lifestyle, claiming association with Artemis and stating he will remain chaste and not take on the burdens of ruling. Upon Phaedra's false accusations Hippolytos' father exiles him and beseeches Poseidon to kill his son.

== Depictions in art ==
In the 5th century BC the city of Athens, then newly relieved from the tyrant Pisistratus by the reforms of Cleisthenes, red-figure pottery was the latest trend in ceramic arts. In black figure pottery from earlier times gods were spectators of the scenes between satyrs and maenads on Dionysiac vases, or between heroes and their women. Attic red figure pottery represent the first known depictions of gods assaulting mortal women, showing the god pursuing the woman with one arm outstretched, holding a phallic symbol in the other, or otherwise having caught the women and grabbing her. Women are depicted as shocked, terrified, with arms raised in resistance or self-defense and usually attempting to flee. Fathers are often shown enthroned, yet unable to intercede to prevent the rape. This depiction of rape becomes established in the popular culture of Athens until the end of the period known as the "Golden Age of Athens".

== Parthenoi ==
In Greek tradition Athena carried the title Parthenos. Associated myths of the parthenoi, holy maidens dedicated to Athena, tell of her priestesses engaging in hieros gamos - sexual acts with the gods, and Athena's outrage and punishment of the priestesses.

Some of the parthenoi myths concern women who reject the traditional role of women and remain unmarried by choice (anumpheutos), hunting with Artemis, instead of participating in the oikos. Outside male control, these women are also denied male protection, and are pursued by the gods for sex.

The change in status following rape (or attempted rape) is irrevocable and the parthenos is changed in some way from her existence prior to the assault. Daphne is a parthenos who wanted to become a huntress with Artemis, remaining unmarried and rejecting the typically feminine. Seen by Apollo who desires and pursues her, Daphne escapes him only by turning into a laurel tree. Aura, another parthenos and huntress noted for running was pursued by Dionysus. Aura outruns the god, but later, drinking water that he has changed into wine, she becomes drunk and is raped when she falls asleep. After giving birth to twins, Aura kills and eats one, and is about to eat the other when Artemis intercedes. Throwing herself into the river, Aura is transformed into a stream.

== The rape of Persephone ==
The Homeric Hymn to Demeter is the oldest known and most complete and significant version of the Persephone myth. Homer describes Persephone as thalere (nubile, ripened) and says she is one of the bathykolpos (deep-breasted) Oceanids. She is a virgin who is gathering flowers with the Oceanid maidens when she is traumatically torn from the world of her childhood and abducted to the underworld, kicking and screaming. From the Hymn:

I sing of Demeter, she of lovely hair, a deity worthy of worship
And the other one, her thin-ankled daughter, who Aidoneus
Stole, and whom deep-voiced, far-sounding Zeus, gave (to him)
Far from Demeter of the golden weapon, she of the splendid fruit,
While she was playing with the deep-breasted maidens of Okeanos:
Picking blossoms, roses, crocuses, and fair violets
On the gentle meadow, iris and hyacinth,
And narcissus, which Gaia-obliging the plans of Zeus for Hades-
Sent forth as bait for the blushing maiden"
