= Thyia (mythology) =

In Greek mythology, Thyia (/ˈθaɪə/; Ancient Greek: Θυία, romanized: Thuía, derived from the verb θύω, thúō, 'to sacrifice') is the name two figures:

- Thyia, daughter of Deucalion and mother of Magnes and Makednos by Zeus.
- Thyia, a naiad who consorted with Apollo.
