= Danaë =

Figure in Greek mythology

- Mother of Perseus
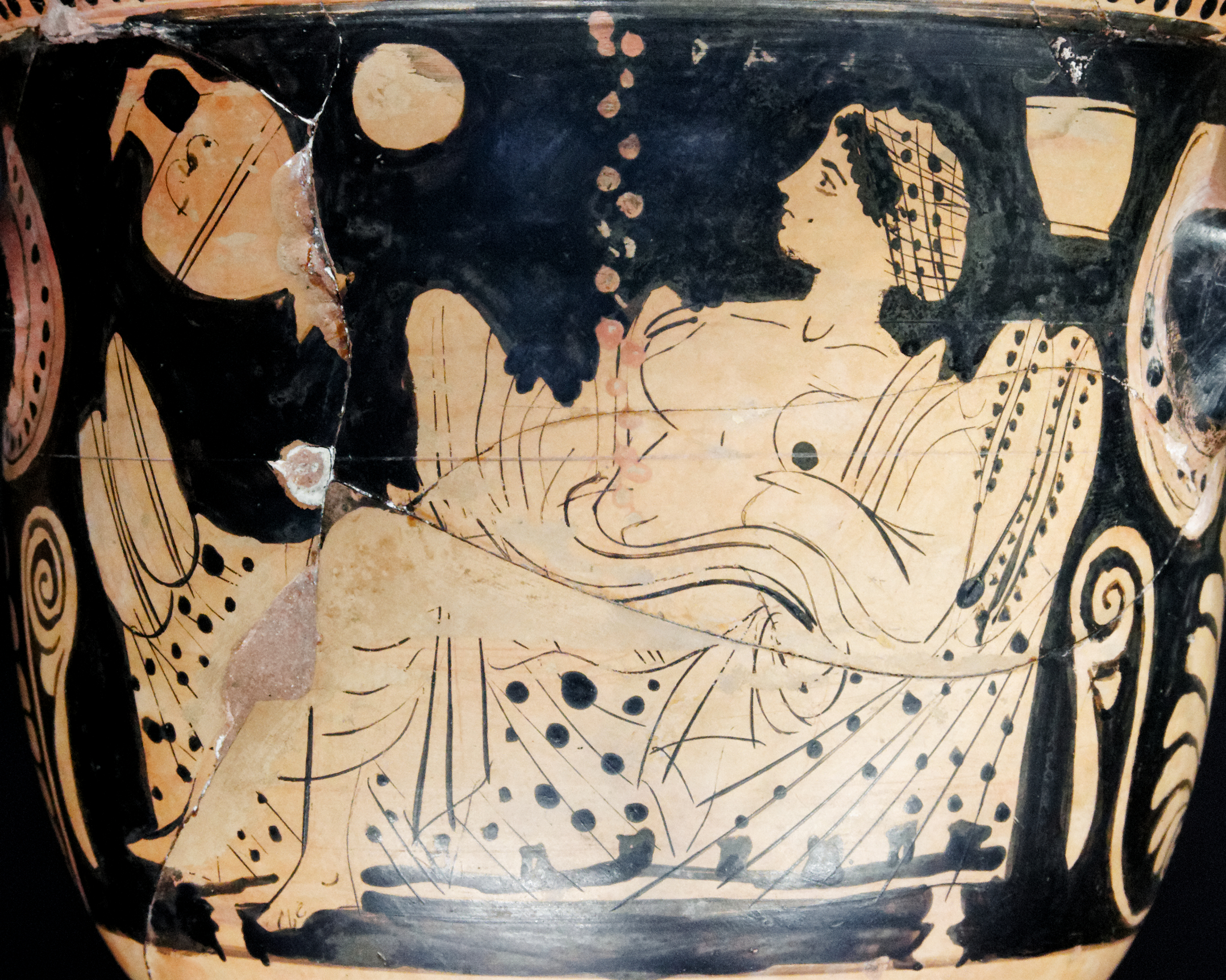
- Ancient Boeotian bell-krater showing Zeus impregnating Danaë in the form of a shower of gold, circa 450–425 BC

Genealogy
- Parents: Acrisius (father); Eurydice (mother)
- Siblings: Evarete
- Consort: Zeus
- Children: Perseus

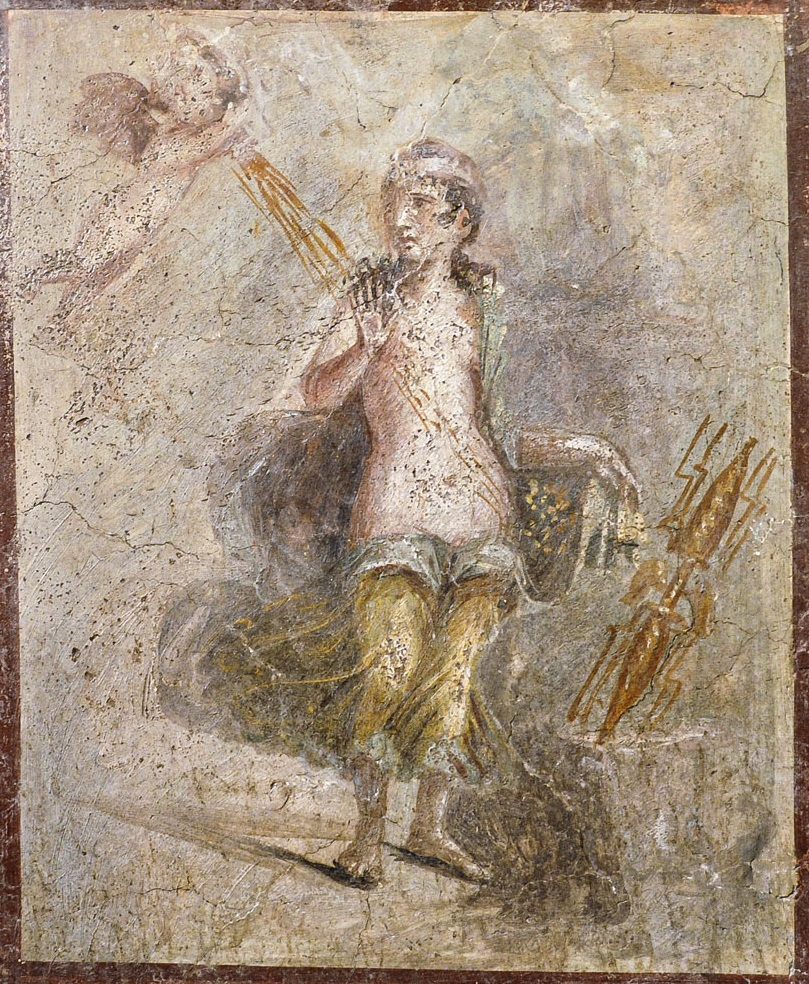
Eros pouring golden rain on Danaë, antique fresco in Pompeii

In Greek mythology, Danaë (/ˈdæneɪ.i/, /ˈdæni.iː/; Ancient Greek: Δανάη, romanized: Danáē; Ancient Greek: [da.ná.ɛː], Modern: [ðaˈna.i]) was an Argive princess and mother of the hero Perseus by Zeus. She was credited with founding the city of Ardea in Latium during the Bronze Age.

== Family ==
Danaë was the daughter and only child of King Acrisius of Argos by his wife, Queen Eurydice, daughter of Lacedaemon and Sparta, or Aganippe. In some accounts, she had a sister, Evarete, wife of King Oenomaus of Pisa and mother of Hippodamia.

By Zeus, Danaë was the mother of the hero Perseus, slayer of Medusa and founder of Mycenae.

== Mythology ==
Disappointed by his lack of male heirs, King Acrisius asked the Oracle of Delphi if this would change. The oracle told him that he would never have a son, but his daughter would, and that this grandson would one day kill him. At the time, Danaë was Acrisius' only daughter, and was childless. Meaning to prevent the prophecy from coming true, Acrisius shut her into a bronze chamber and buried it underground. Other authors have alternatively described Danaë as being locked in a brazen tower with only a small vent as a source of light and air.

However, Zeus desired Danaë, and came to her in the form of golden rain that streamed in through the roof of her chamber and onto her lap, impregnating her. Soon after, Perseus was born. Upon discovering the child, Acrisius was enraged and refused to believe that Zeus was Perseus' father. However, he didn't want to provoke the wrath of the gods or Furies by killing his family, and instead placed Danaë and Perseus into a wooden chest and cast it into the sea. The sea was calmed by Poseidon and, at the behest of Zeus, the pair survived.

They were washed ashore on the island of Serifos, where they were taken in by the fisherman Dictys—brother of King Polydectes—who raised Perseus to manhood in the temple of Athena. The King was charmed by Danaë, but she had no interest in him. Consequently, he agreed not to marry her only if her son would bring him the head of the Gorgon Medusa. Using Athena's shield, Hermes's winged sandals and Hades's helmet of invisibility, Perseus was able to evade Medusa's gaze and decapitate her.

Later, after Perseus brought back Medusa's head and rescued Andromeda the princess of Aethiopia. Perseus started towards Argos, but when Acrisius heard of this, he fled to Larissa where an athletics competition was being held. Perseus then also journeyed to Larissa and partook in the games. During the competition, Perseus accidentally struck Acrisius on the foot or head with his javelin (or discus), killing him and fulfilling the prophecy.

== Genealogy ==
Argive genealogy in Greek mythology

Oceanus	Tethys
Inachus	Melia
Zeus	Io	Phoroneus
Epaphus	Memphis
Libya	Poseidon
Achiroë	Belus	Agenor	Telephassa
Danaus	Elephantis	Aegyptus	Cadmus	Cilix	Europa	Phoenix
Mantineus	Hypermnestra	Lynceus	Harmonia	Zeus
Sparta	Lacedaemon	Ocalea	Abas	Polydorus	Agave	Sarpedon	Rhadamanthus
Eurydice	Acrisius	Autonoë	Ino	Minos
Zeus	Danaë	Semele	Zeus
Perseus	Dionysus

Colour key:

Male
Female
Deity

== Gallery ==
Danaë in art

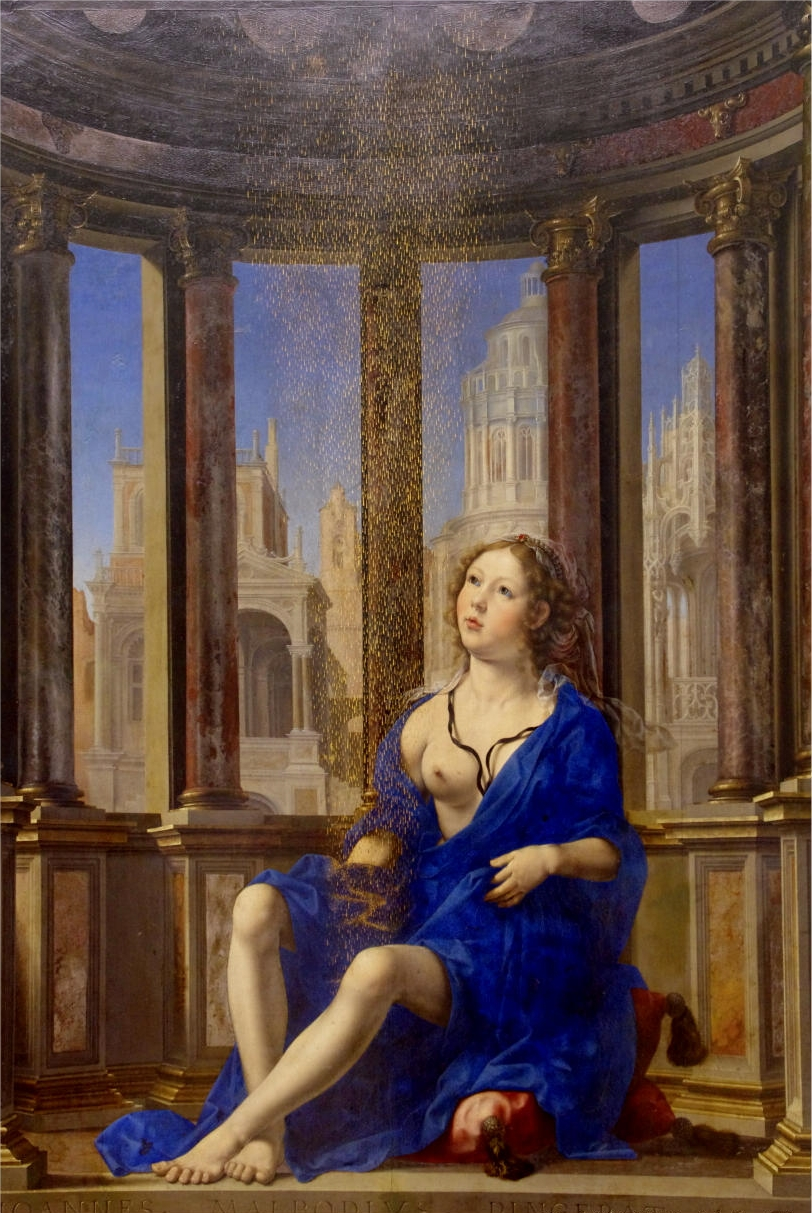
Jan Gossaert, 1527

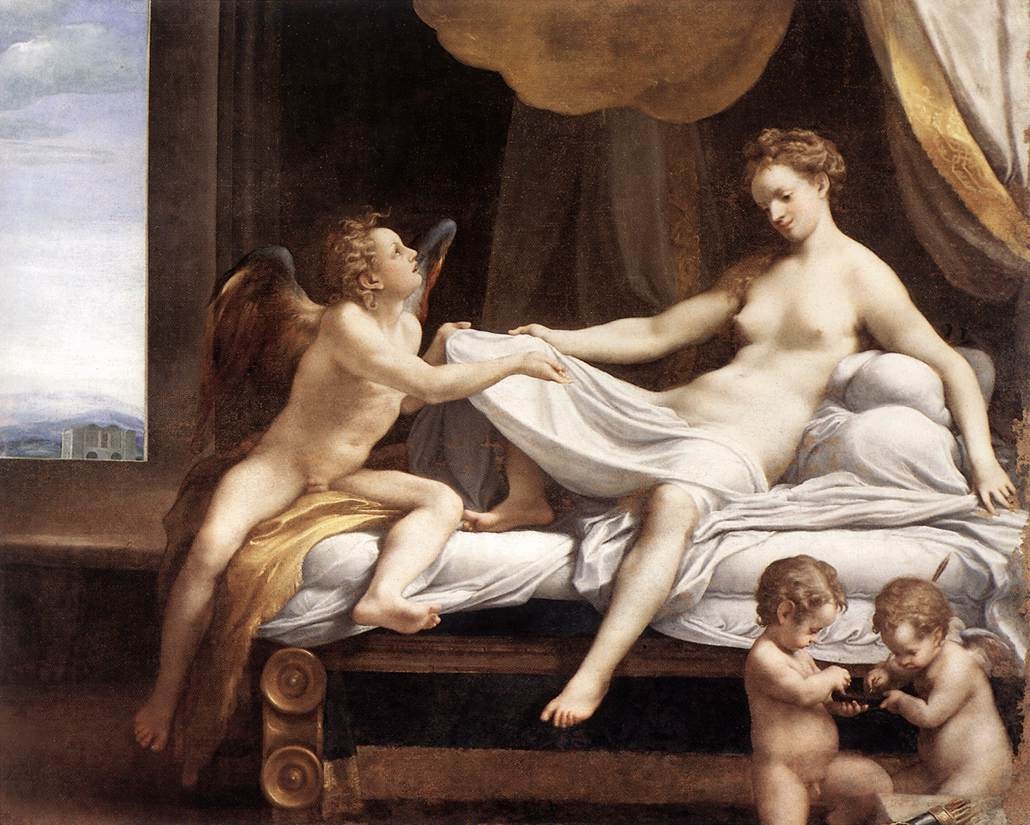
Correggio's Danaë, 1531–1532.

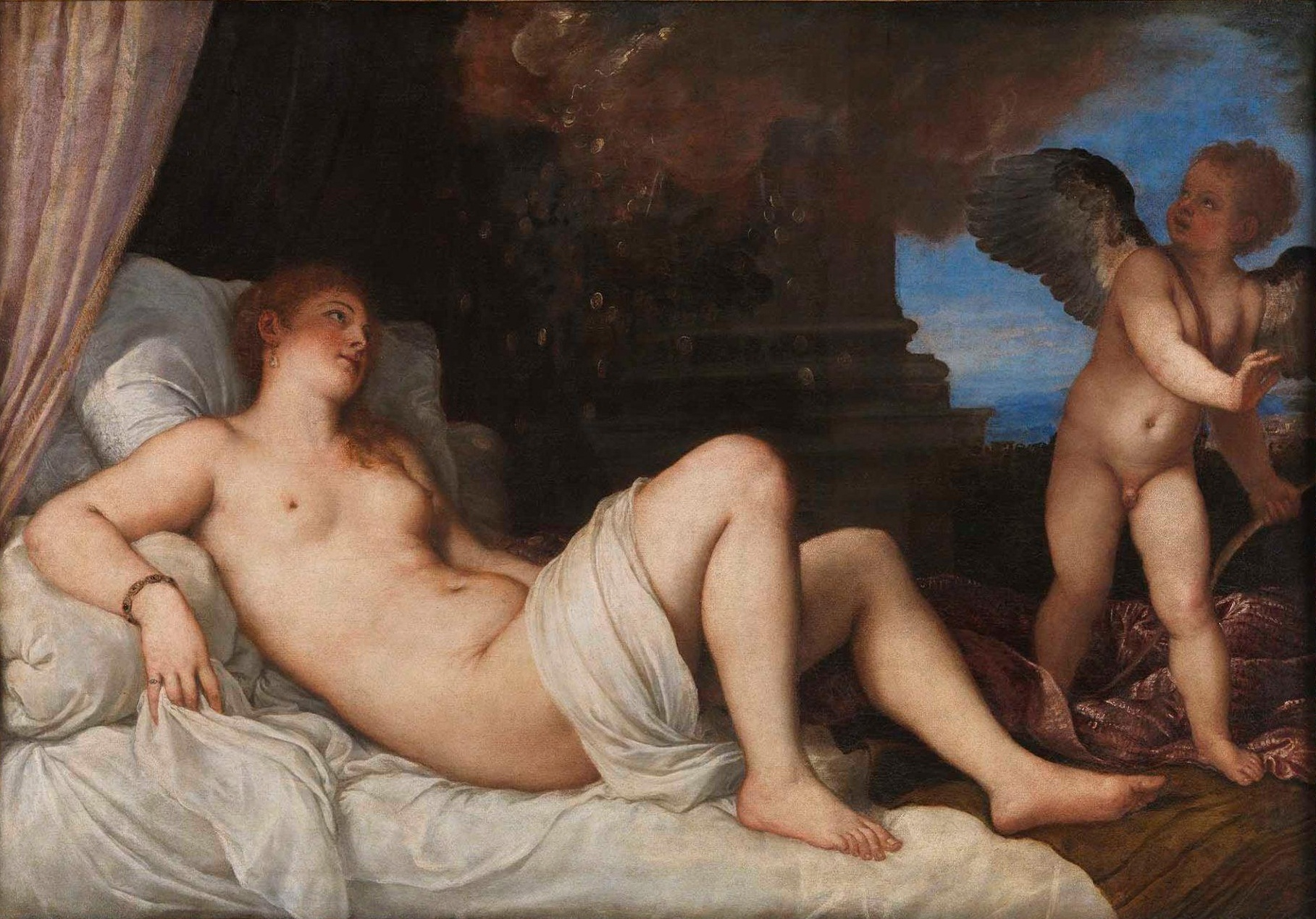
One of several variants by Titian, 1544. Cupid is alongside Danaë. 120 cm × 172 cm. National Museum of Capodimonte, Naples

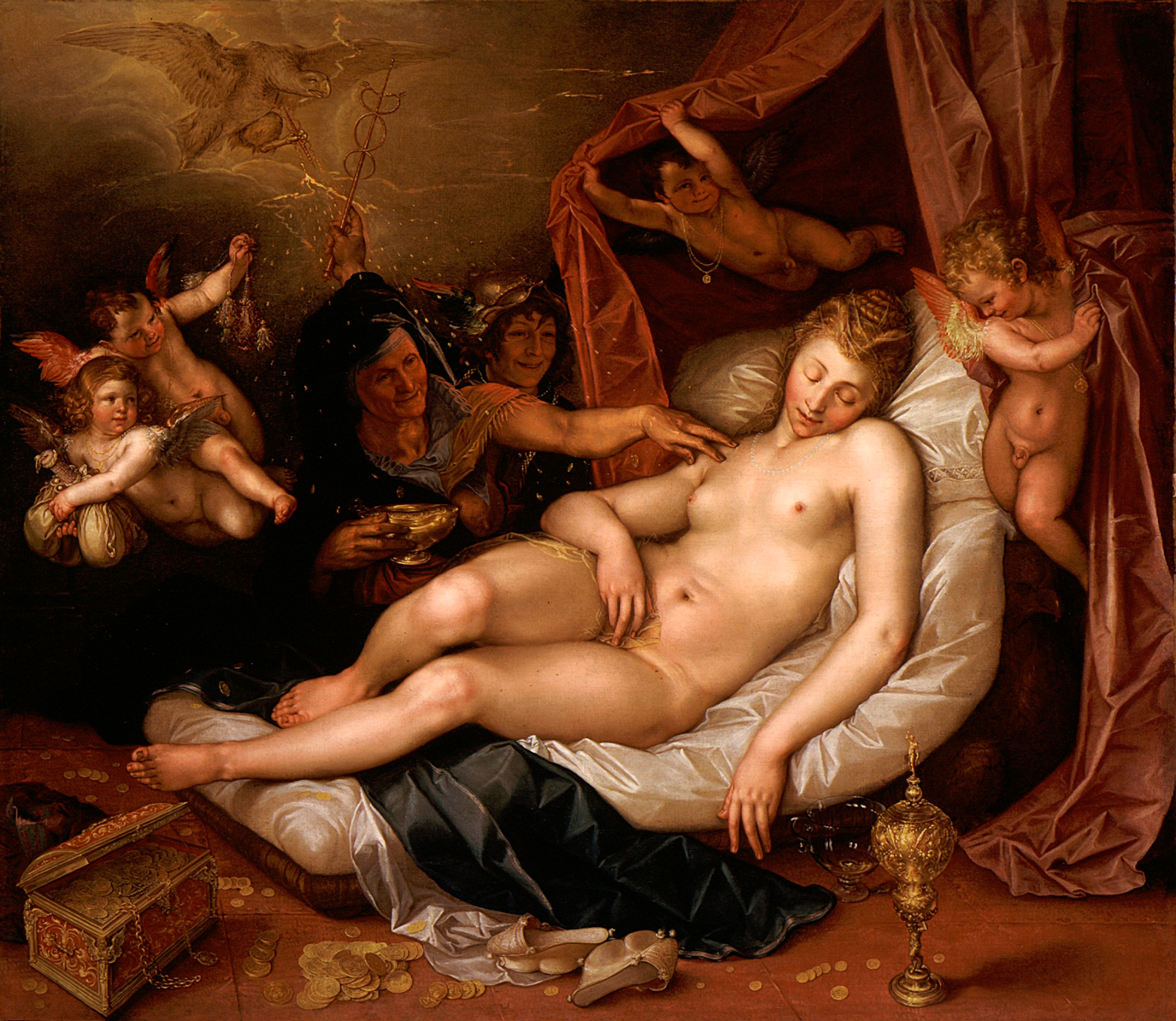
Hendrick Goltzius, 1603

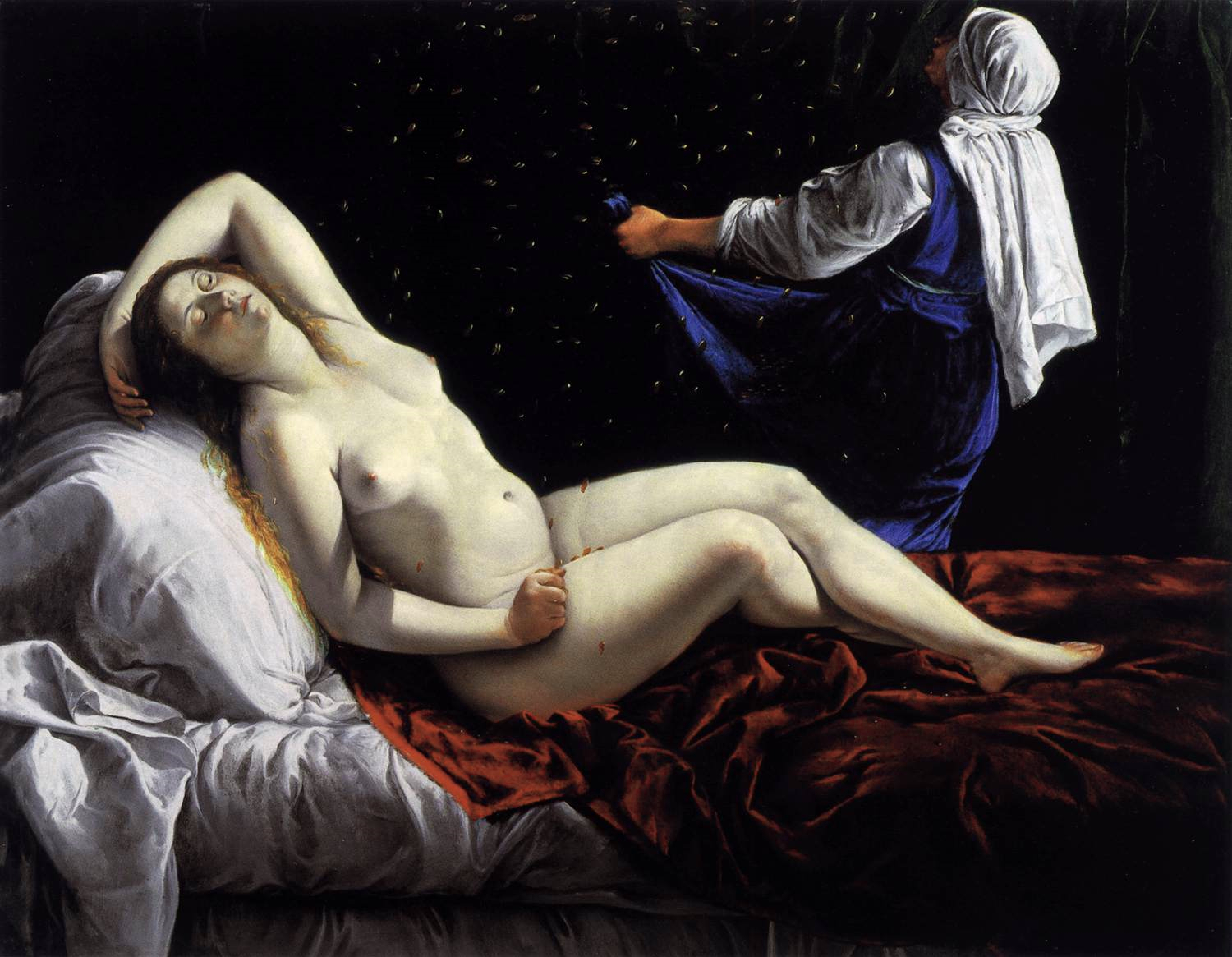
Artemisia Gentileschi, c. 1612

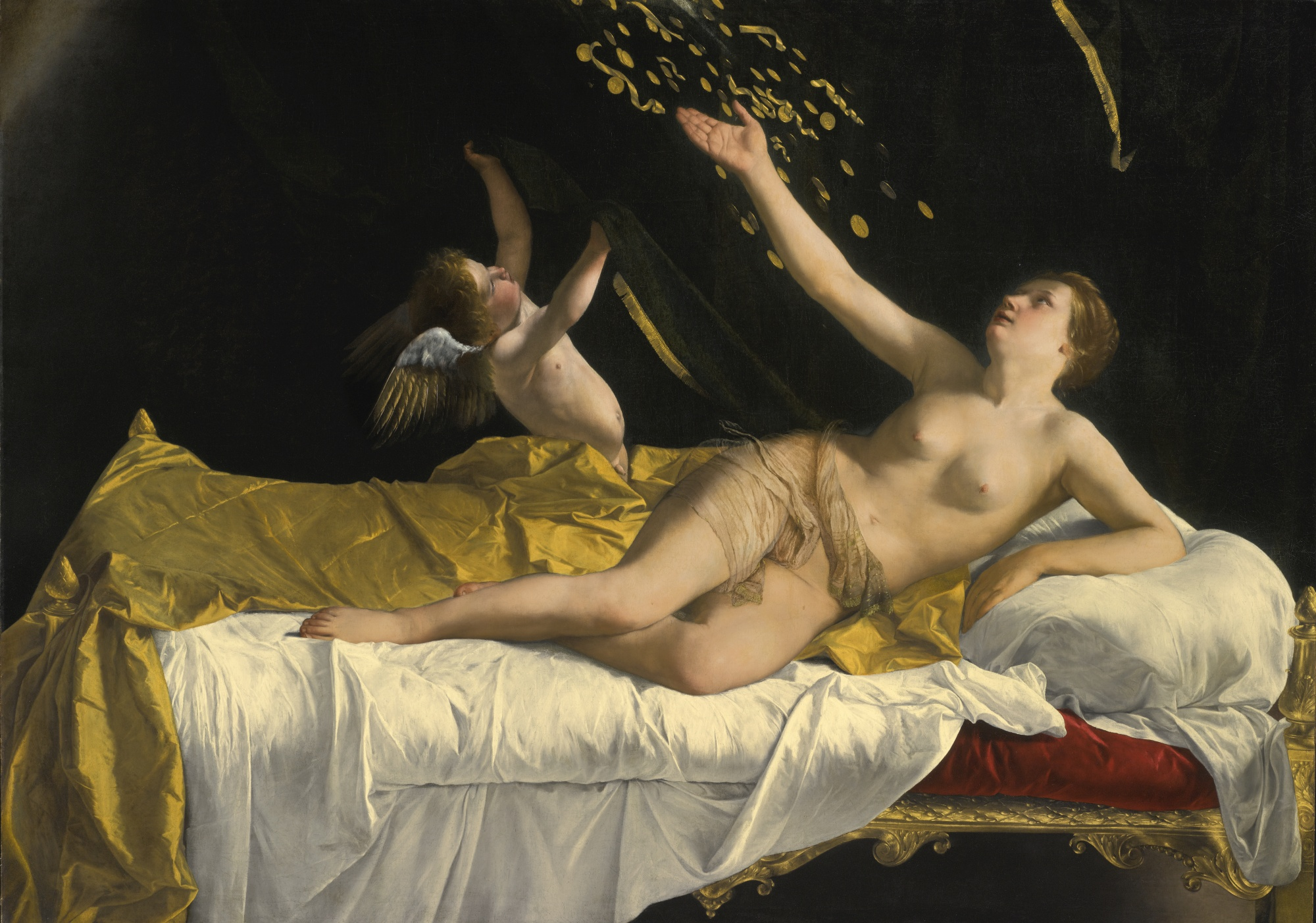
Danaë by Orazio Gentileschi, 1621–23.

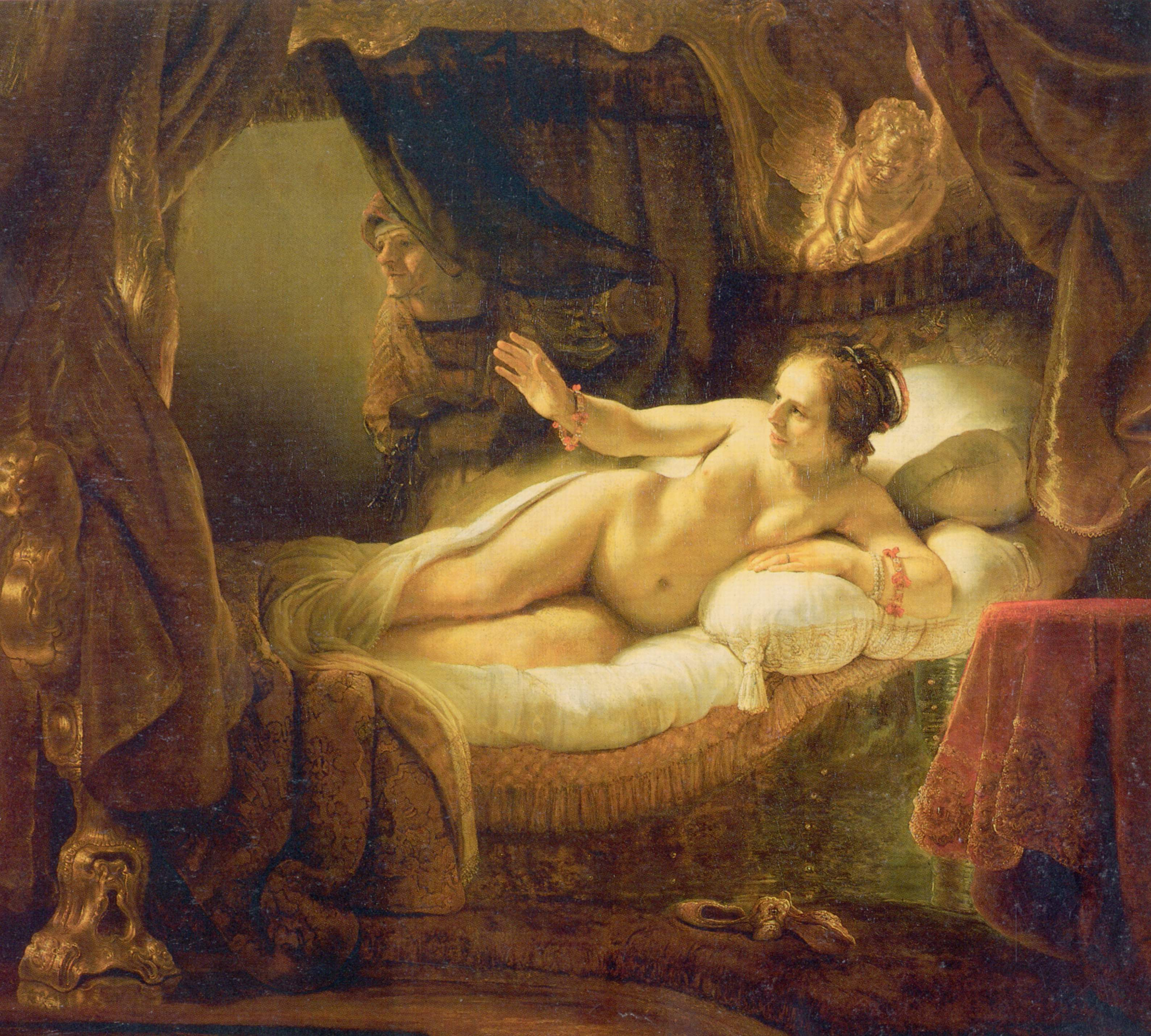
Rembrandt's Danaë, c. 1636.

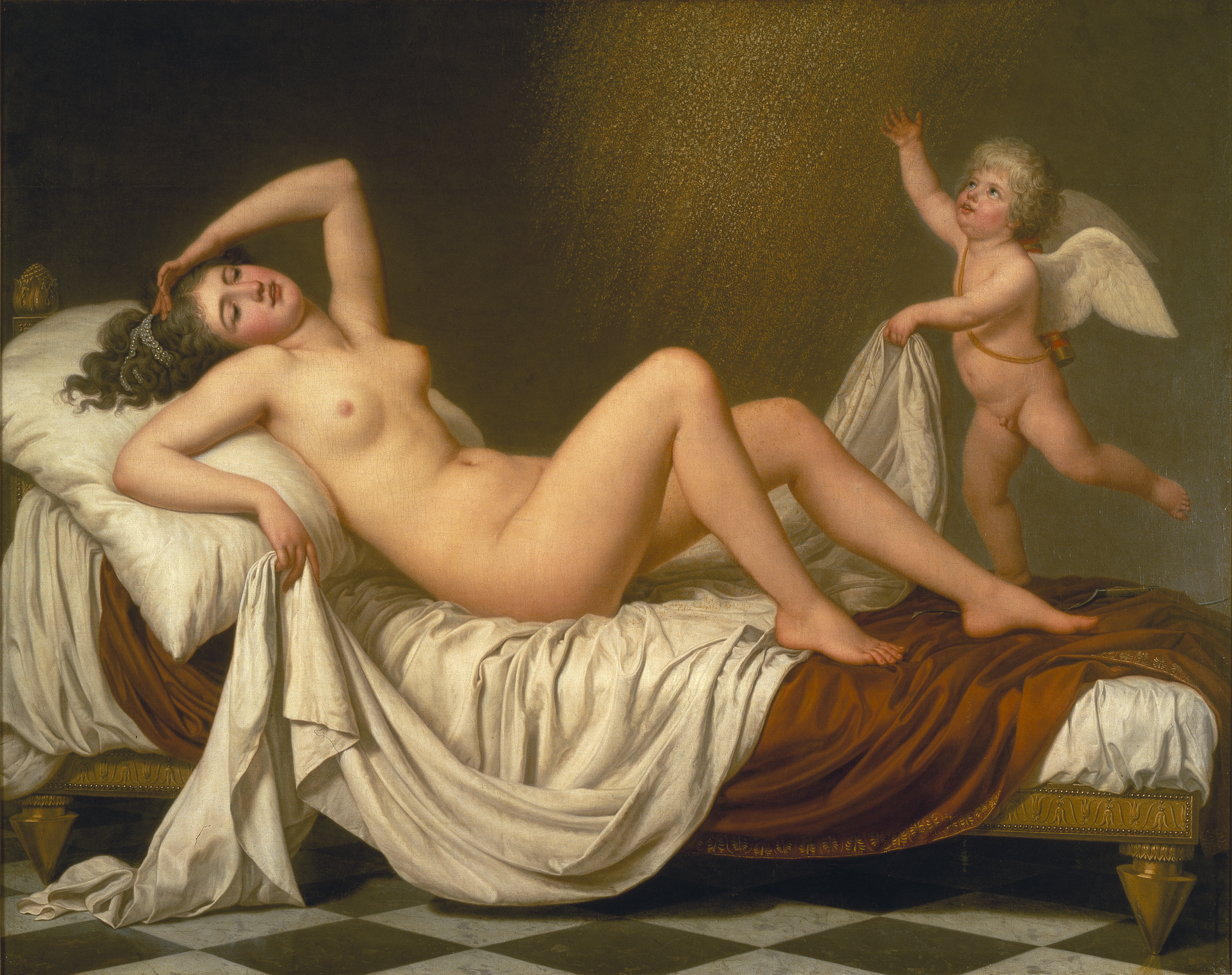
Danaë receiving Jupiter in a Shower of Gold, by Adolf Ulrik Wertmüller (1787)

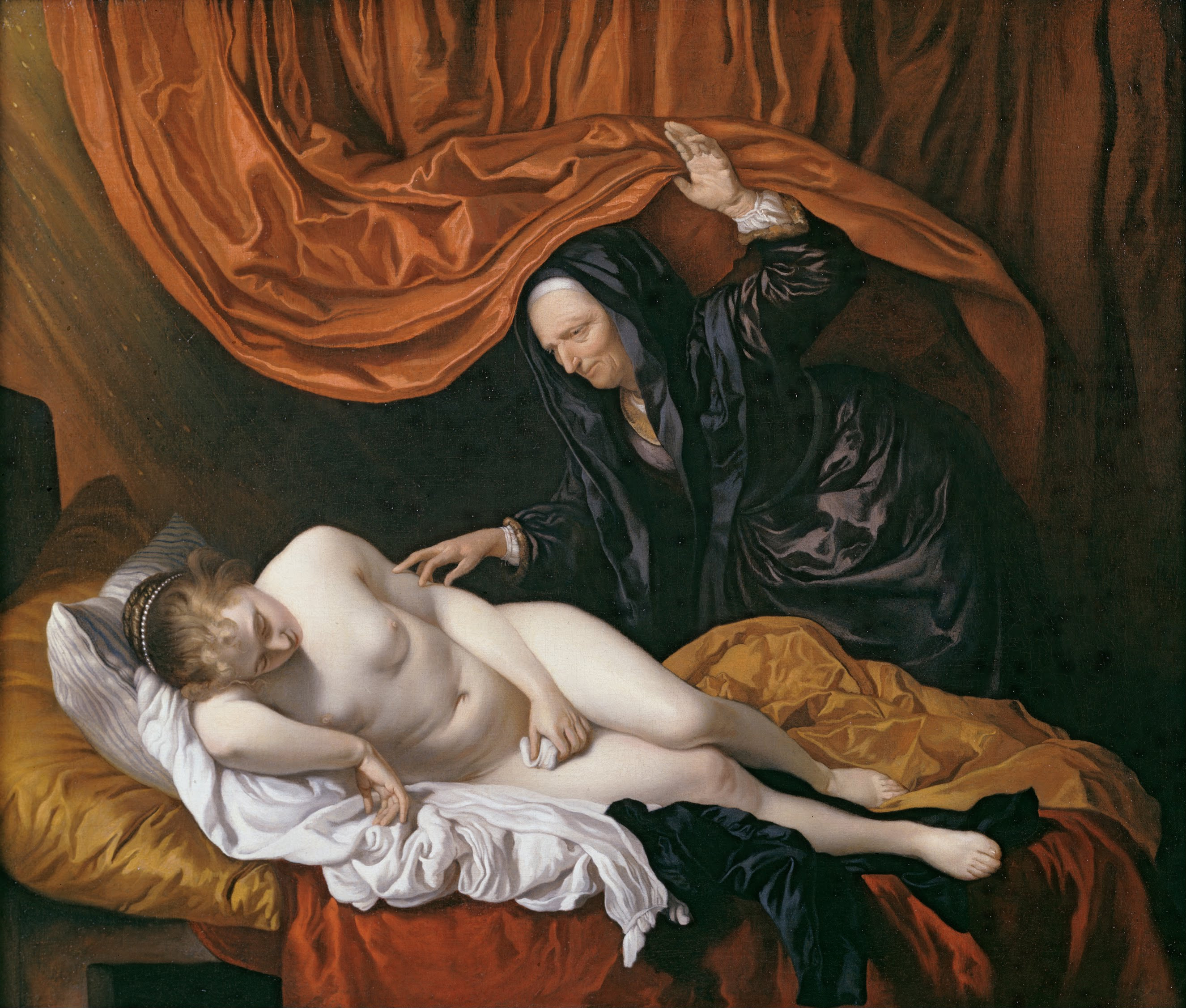
Jacob van Loo, 1650s

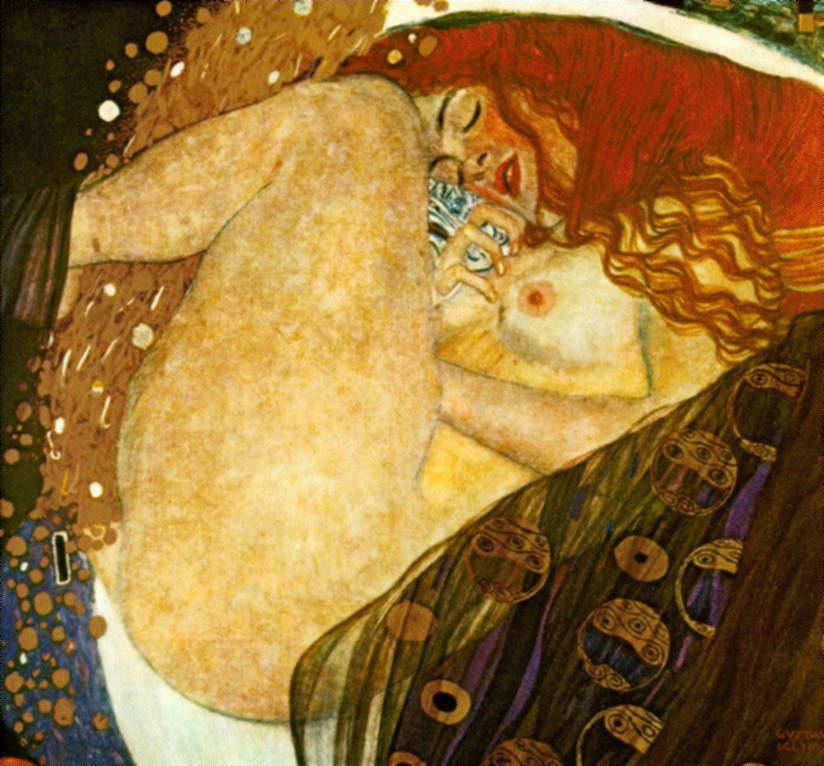
Gustav Klimt's Danaë, 1907.

== General and cited references ==
- Gaius Julius Hyginus, Fabulae from The Myths of Hyginus translated and edited by Mary Grant. University of Kansas Publications in Humanistic Studies. Online version at the Topos Text Project.
- Apollodorus, The Library with an English Translation by Sir James George Frazer, F.B.A., F.R.S. in 2 Volumes, Cambridge, MA, Harvard University Press; London, William Heinemann Ltd. 1921. Online version at the Perseus Digital Library. Greek text available from the same website.
- Smith, William; Dictionary of Greek and Roman Biography and Mythology, London (1873). "Danae", Acri'sius
