= Dictys =

Name in Greek mythology

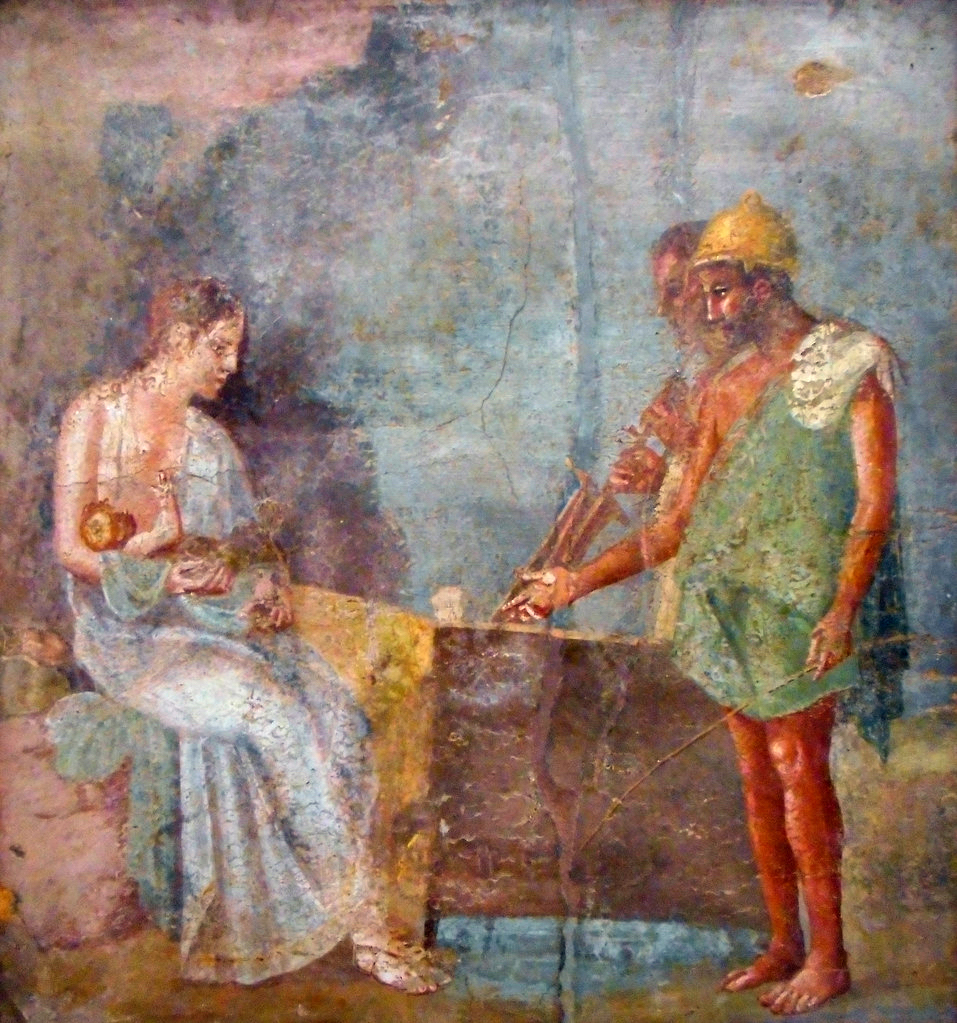
Dictys finds Danaë and Perseus, 1st-century Roman fresco from Pompeii.

Dictys (Ancient Greek: Δίκτυς, romanized: Díktus, lit. 'netman') was a name attributed to four men in Greek mythology.

- Dictys, a fisherman and brother of King Polydectes of Seriphos, both being the sons of Magnes and a Naiad, or of Peristhenes and Androthoe, or else of Poseidon and Cerebia. He discovered Danaë and Perseus inside a chest that had been washed up on shore (or was caught in his fishing net). He treated them well and raised Perseus as his own son. After Perseus killed Medusa, rescued Andromeda, and later showed Medusa's head to Polydectes turning him and the nobles with him to stone, he made Dictys king. Dictys and his wife, Clymene, had an altar within a sacred precinct of Perseus in Athens.
- Dictys, one of the sailors who tried to abduct Dionysus but was turned into a dolphin by the god.
- Dictys, a centaur who attended Pirithous's wedding and battled against the Lapiths. While fleeing Pirithous, he slipped and fell off of a cliff. He was impaled on the top of an ash tree and died.
- Dictys, the Elean son of Poseidon and Agamede, daughter of Augeas. He was the brother of Actor and Belus.
- Dictys is also the title of a lost play by Euripides, which survives in fragmentary form.
