= Magnes (mythology) =

In Greek mythology, Magnes (/ˈmæɡˌniːz/; Ancient Greek: Μάγνης, romanized: Mágnes) was a name attributed to several men.

- Magnes, eponym and first king of Magnesia. He was the son of Zeus and Thyia or of Aeolus and Enarete.
- Magnes, a son of Argos and Perimele, and father of Hymenaeus; from him also a portion of Thessaly derived its name Magnesia.
- Magnes, one of the Suitors of Penelope who came from Zacynthus along with other 43 wooers. He, with the other suitors, was killed by Odysseus with the assistance of Eumaeus, Philoetius, and Telemachus.
