= Bromius =

Epithet of Dionysus

Bromius (Ancient Greek: Βρόμιος) in ancient Greece was used as an epithet of Dionysus/Bacchus. It signifies "noisy", "roaring", or "boisterous", from βρέμειν, to roar. According to Richard Buxton, Bromius (Bromios) is another name for a fundamental divine figure that precedes Ouranus and Night in Orphic myth. This alternative view to Hesiod was discovered by a fragmentary papyrus discovered in Derveni, Macedonia (Greece) in 1962, which is referred to as the Derveni papyrus.

== Mythology ==
Bromius is another name for Dionysus, the son of Semele and Zeus. Zeus' jealous wife Hera discovered the affair and contrived to influence Semele to request that Zeus revealed his true form to her. Once Zeus has promised his lover that he will grant her any wish, she asks to see him in his godly appearance (an event referred to in antiquity as an epiphany). Semele's mortal frame cannot withstand the overwhelming spectacle, accompanied by lightning and fire, and she is destroyed. Since all sexual intercourse with gods is procreative, Semele was pregnant at the time, and Zeus plucks the child from its mother's womb and puts him in his thigh until he is ready to be born. Despite his half-mortal heritage, Bromius is a true god as opposed to a demi-god on account of being born from Zeus – the “twice-born god”.
