= Nilus (mythology) =

Ancient Greek god of the Nile river

Nilus or Neilos
- River god of the Nile
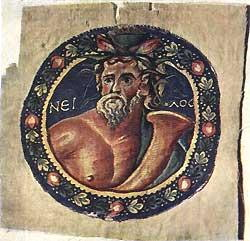
- Nilus in a Coptic tapestry.
- Abode: River Nile in Egypt

Genealogy
- Parents: Oceanus and Tethys
- Siblings: The river gods and Oceanids
- Consort: Nephele, Callirhoe, Euthenia
- Offspring: Achiroe, Memphis, Telephassa, Chione, Anippe, Caliadne (possibly), Polyxo (possibly)

In Greek mythology, Nilus (/ˈnaɪləs/ NYE-ləs; Ancient Greek: Νεῖλος, romanized: Neilos) is one of 3,000 river gods, who represent the god of the Nile river itself. Nilus is the son of the water gods Oceanus and Tethys.

== Family ==
Nilus was one of 3,000 river gods children of the Titans Oceanus and his sister-wife Tethys. He was father to several children, of these included Memphis (mother of Libya by Epaphus a king of Egypt).

His granddaughter Libya in turn became mother to Belus and Agenor. These sons then married (presumably) younger daughters of his son Nilus named Anchiroe and Telephassa, respectively. A daughter Chione was said to be borne to Nilus and Callirhoe, an Oceanid. His other children include: Argiope, Anippe, Eurryroe, Europa and possibly Caliadne, Polyxo and Thebe.

== Mythology ==
=== Parentage ===
- Hesiod, Theogony:

And Tethys bore to Ocean eddying rivers, Nilus, and Alpheus, and deep-swirling Eridanus.

- Hyginus, Fabulae:

From Oceanus and Tethys [were born] the Oceanides . . . Of the same descent Rivers : Strymon, Nile, Euphrates, Tanais, Indus, Cephisus, Ismenus, Axenus, Achelous, Simoeis, Inachus, Alpheus, Thermodon, Scamandrus, Tigris, Maeandrus, Orontes.

=== Offspring ===
- Apollodorus, Bibliotheca:

When Epaphos was ruler of the Aigyptians (Egyptians), he married Neilos' daughter Memphis, and in her honour founded the polis of Memphis, and fathered a daughter Libya. [N.B. Libya was the ancient Greek name for the continent of Africa.]

- Apollodorus, Bibliotheca:

Belos (Belus) [grandson of Epaphos] remained to become king of Aigyptos (Egypt), and married Neilos' daughter Ankhinoe (Anchinoe), who gave him twin sons, Aigyptos (Aegyptus) and Danaus.

- Pseudo-Plutarch, Greek and Roman Parallel Stories:

Bousiris (Busiris), the son of Poseidon and Anippe, daughter of Neilos ... So says Agathon of Samos.

- Tzetzes, Chiliades:

Hippostratus says that Aegyptus has begotten only by Eurryroe,
The daughter of Nilus, fifty sons;
As well as Danaus has begotten all his daughters,
By Europa, the daughter of Nilus,...

== See also ==
- Hapi (Nile god)
- Nile God Statue, Naples
