= Cyathus (mythology) =

In Greek mythology, Cyathus (Ancient Greek: Κύαθος, romanized: Kýathos, lit. 'cup', 'drinking cup' or 'ladle') was the Calydonian youthful cup-bearer of his kinsman King Oeneus. He was the son of Architeles or of Pyles and the brother of Antimachus.. In some accounts, Cyathus was called Archias (Ἀρχίαν), Cherias (Χερίαν), Eunomus (Εὔνομος) or Eurynomus.

== Mythology ==
When Heracles visited his father-in-law Oeneus, Cyathus was killed by the hero who struck him on the head with one of his fingers or with a blow of his fist. This is on account of a fault committed in the discharge of his duty. Seeing that it was an accident, Architeles pardoned Heracles but the latter in accordance with the law, exiled himself and went to Ceyx at Trachis.

Cyathus was honored at Phlius with a sanctuary close by the temple of Apollo. Meanwhile, according to Nicander's second book of History of Oeta, a temple was dedicated by Heracles in Proschium, which to this day is called the Temple of the Cupbearer.
