= Eurynomus (mythology) =

Greek mythological figures

In Greek mythology, Eurynomos (/jʊəˈrɪnəməs/; Ancient Greek: Εὐρύνομος, romanized: Eurynomos, lit. 'wide-ruling' or 'wide-varying/ broad custom') may refer to the following characters:

- Eurynomos, a daimon of the underworld.
- Eurynomos, according to Ovid, one the Centaurs who fought against the Lapiths at the wedding of Hippodamia.
- Eurynomos, a son of Magnes and Phylodice and brother of Eioneus. He was the father of Hippios, who was devoured by Sphinx, and of Orsinome, who married Lapithes.
- Eurynomus, also called Eunomus (Εὔνομος), Archias, Cherias and Cyathus. He was the Calydonian son of Architeles and kinsman of King Oineus. He was accidentally killed by Heracles with a blow of his knuckles.
- Eurynomos, a defender of Troy killed by Ajax the Great.
- Eurynomus, the third son of Aigyptios and brother of Antiphos. He was one of the Suitors of Penelope from Ithaca along with 11 other wooers. Eurynomus, with the other suitors, was killed by Odysseus with the assistance of Eumaeus, Philoetius, and Telemachus.
