= Architeles =

Architeles (Ancient Greek: Ἀρχιτέλης) was the name of several people from ancient Greek mythology:

- Architeles, the Calydonian kinsman King Oeneus and father of a young cupbearer named variously as Archias, Cherias, Eurynomus, Eunomus or Cyathus whom Heracles killed by accident on his visit to Oeneus. The father forgave Heracles but the hero nevertheless went into voluntary exile.
- Architeles, a son of Achaeus and Automate, and brother of Archander, together with whom he carried on a war against the king Lamedon. He married a woman also named Automate, who was the daughter of Danaus.
