= Idas (son of Aphareus) =

Messenian prince and argonaut in Greek mythology

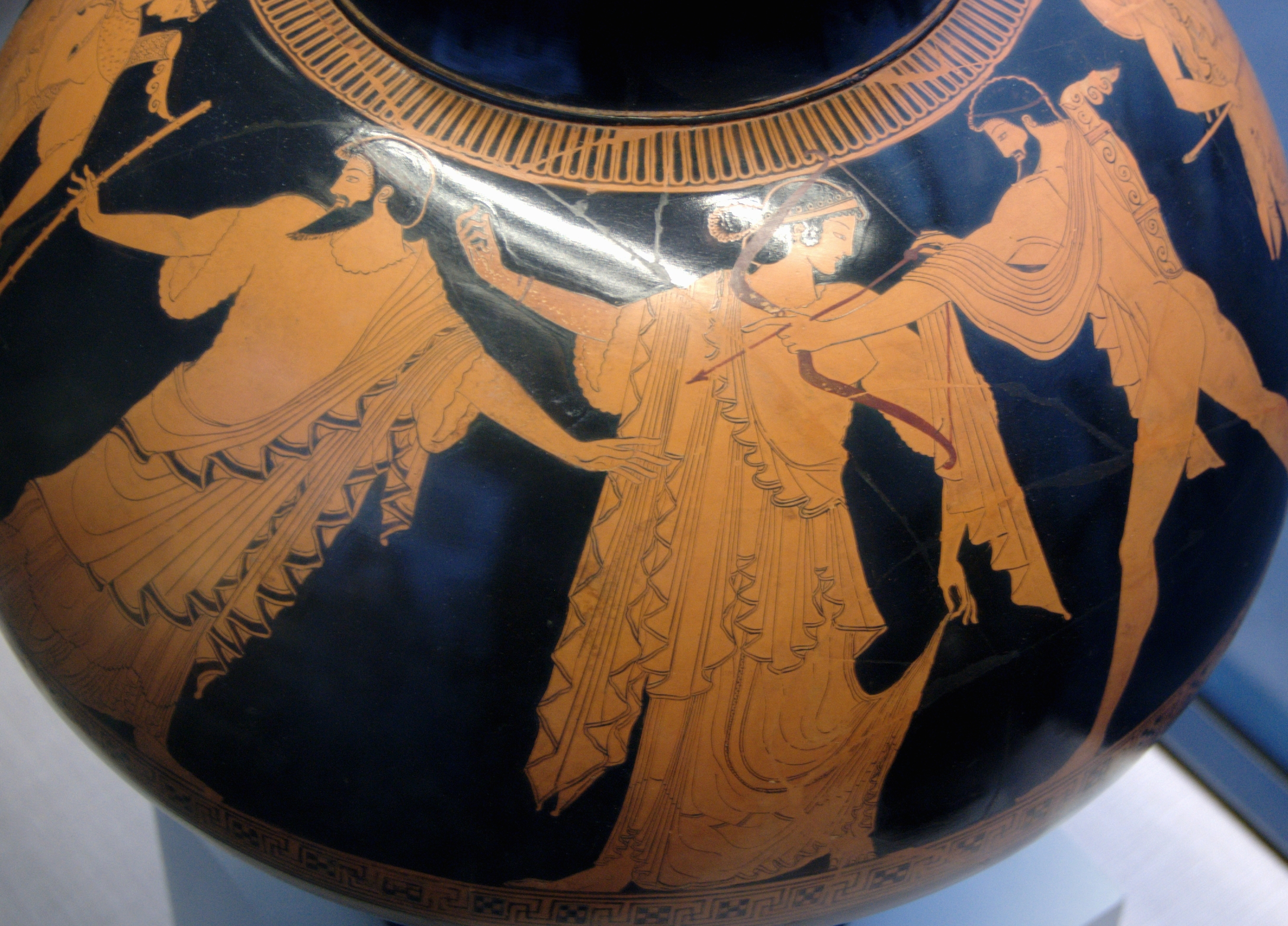
Marpessa and Idas, separated from Apollo by Zeus, Attic red-figure psykter, ca. 480 BC, Staatliche Antikensammlungen (Inv. 2417).

In Greek mythology, Idas (/ˈaɪdəs/; Ancient Greek: Ἴδας, romanized: Ídas), was a Messenian prince. He was one of the Argonauts, a participant in the hunt for the Calydonian Boar, and contender with the gods. Idas was described as keen and spirited.

== Family ==
Idas was son of Aphareus and Arene, and the elder brother of Lynceus and Pisus. He was sometimes regarded as the offspring of Poseidon. In some accounts, the wife of Aphareus and thus, Idas' possible mother was named as Polydora or Laocoosa. By Marpessa, Idas had one daughter named Cleopatra, who married Meleager.

== Mythology ==
=== Contest for Marpessa's hand ===
When Idas came from Messenia to ask for the hand of Marpessa, daughter of Evenus. The maiden's father refused his request because he wanted his daughter to remain a virgin. Idas went to his father Poseidon and begged for the use of a winged chariot. Poseidon consented to his use of the chariot, and Idas stole Marpessa away from a band of dancers and fled to Pleuron in Aetolia. Her father, after chasing the couple for a long time and realizing he could not catch up to them, killed his horses and then drowned himself in a nearby river Lycormas and became immortal. The river was named later after him.

Apollo also pursued them in his own chariot, wanting Marpessa for himself.

Idas that was mightiest of men that were then upon the face of earth;
who also took his bow to face the king Phoebus Apollo
for the sake of the fair-ankled maid [i.e. Marpessa].

As the two fought for the girl's hand, Zeus eventually intervened and commanded Marpessa to choose between her mortal lover and the god. Marpessa chose Idas, reasoning to Apollo that had she chosen the god, she would have eventually grown old and lost his affections:

And thou beautiful god, in that far time,
When in thy setting sweet thou gazest down
On this grey head, wilt thou remember then
That once I pleased thee, that I once was young?

=== Fight with the Dioscuri ===
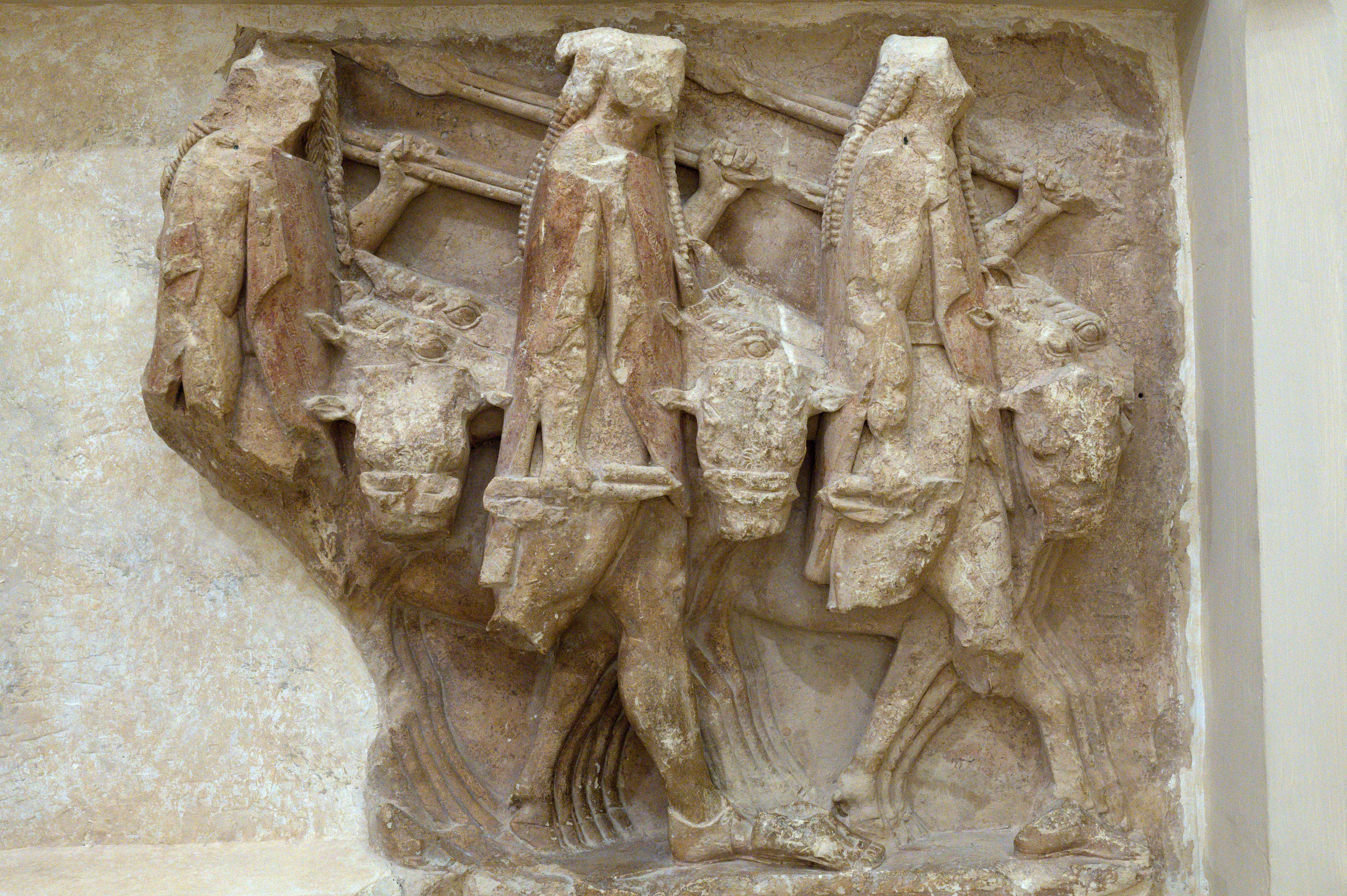
The Dioscuri, Idas and Lynceus take the cattle, metope of the Treasury of Sicyon at Delphi, ca 560 BC.

==== Hyginus' version ====
The two beautiful daughters of Leucippus, Phoebe and Hilaeira were promised brides of their cousins, Idas and Lynceus. Because of their beauty, the twins Castor and Pollux who were inflamed with love, carried off the maidens. Trying to recover their lost brides-to-be, the two Messenian princes, took to arms and joined the celebrated fight between them and their rival suitors. During the battle, Castor killed Lynceus while Idas, at his brother's death, forgot both the strife and bride, and started to bury his brother. When he was placing the bones in a funeral monument, Castor intervened and tried to prevent his raising of the monument, because he had won over him as if he were a woman. In anger, Idas pierced the thigh of Castor with the sword he wore. Others say that, as he was building the monument he pushed it on Castor and thus killed him. When they reported this to Pollux, he rushed up and overcame Idas in a single fight, recovered the body of his brother, and buried it.

==== Apollodorus' version ====
A different tale was presented in the Bibliotheca, where the cause of the strife of the Aphareids and Dioscuri was not the abduction of the Leucippides but the division of spoils between them. Castor and Pollux, having driven a booty of cattle from Arcadia in company with Idas and Lynceus, allowed Idas to divide the spoil. He cut a cow in four and declared that whoever ate his portion of the cow first would have half the spoil, whereas the other half would go to the one who finished his portion second. Idas quickly devoured his own chunk, and then grabbed Lynceus's portion and ate that as well. As the first and second portions to be finished belonged to the two Messenians, Idas and Lynceus took the cattle with them to Messene. The Dioscuri however, feeling cheated, marched against Messene, and took the cattle back. As they lay in wait for Idas and Lynceus, Lynceus spied Castor and informed Idas, who killed Castor. Pollux then chased them and slew Lynceus by throwing his spear, but was himself hit in the head with a stone by Lynceus. In revenge, the divine father of Pollux, Zeus, smote Idas with a thunderbolt and carried up his son to the heavens above where he shared his immortality with his mortal brother.

After the deaths of the two Messenian princes, the kingdom was bereft of male descendants and thus, Nestor, son of Neleus, and a relative, obtained the whole land including all the part ruled formerly by Idas, but not that subject (Tricca) to the sons of Asclepius, Machaon and Podalirius.

=== Other adventures ===
Idas wished to rob Teuthras, king of Moesia, of his kingdom but was overcame in one battle by Telephus, son of Auge and Heracles, with the help of Parthenopaeus, son of Atalanta.

On their journey to fetch the Golden Fleece, Idas avenged the death of Idmon, son of Apollo by slaying the wild boar that had wounded and killed the seer.
