= Mnesileus =

Greek mythological character

In Greek mythology, Mnesileus (Ancient Greek: Μνησίλεως Mnesileos) or Mnasinous (Μνασίνους) was the son of Polydeuces, one of the Dioscuri, and Phoebe, daughter of Leucippus of Messenia. The temple of the Dioscuri at Argos contained also the statues of these two sons of the Dioscuri, Anaxias and Mnasinous, and on the throne of Amyclae both were represented riding on horseback.
