= Cleopatra (daughter of Idas) =

Greek mythological figure

In Greek mythology Cleopatra (Ancient Greek: Κλεοπάτρα, romanized: Kleopátra, lit. 'father's glory'), sometimes called Alcyone (Ancient Greek: Ἀλκυόνη, romanized: Alkuónē, lit. 'kingfisher') was the daughter of Idas and Marpessa and the wife of Meleager, a Calydonian prince and participant in the Calydonian boar hunt. Together they had a daughter, Polydora. According to Greek traveler and geographer Pausanias, Polydora was the wife of Protesilas, the first soldier to leap ashore in Troy, and therefore the first to die in the Trojan War.

== Mythology ==
Cleopatra has differing levels of responsibility and importance depending on the version of the story. When the famed Calydonian boar was finally slain, Meleager had the rights to its skin as he had delivered the final blow. However, he instead gifted it to Atalanta. This angered Meleager's uncles, Plexippus and Agenor, as they found it insulting that a woman should receive the prize instead of a man. They took the skin from Atalanta, and Meleager slew them in a rage. According to some accounts, his mother Althaea, angered by the deaths of her brothers, threw the piece of wood his life was tied to into a fire, killing him immediately.

In other accounts, Meleager's actions led to a war between the Calydonians and the Curetes, led by the sons of Thestius. However, when Althaea curses at Meleager upon learning of the deaths of her brothers, he becomes so enraged that he refuses to fight in the war. Instead, he returned to his home with Cleopatra and ignored his family and closest friends when they came to his door begging him to help protect Calydon against the siege. It was only until Cleopatra finally pleaded with him to protect the city that Meleager agreed to rejoin the battle. This decision led to a Calydonian victory. However, Althaea had prayed to the gods and begged them to kill her son, and he falls in battle.

After learning of her husband's death, Cleopatra either died of grief or hung herself. This means that three generations of women– Marpessa, Cleopatra, and Polydora– all committed suicide upon the deaths of their husbands.
