= The Rape of the Daughters of Leucippus =

Painting by Peter Paul Rubens and Jan Wildens

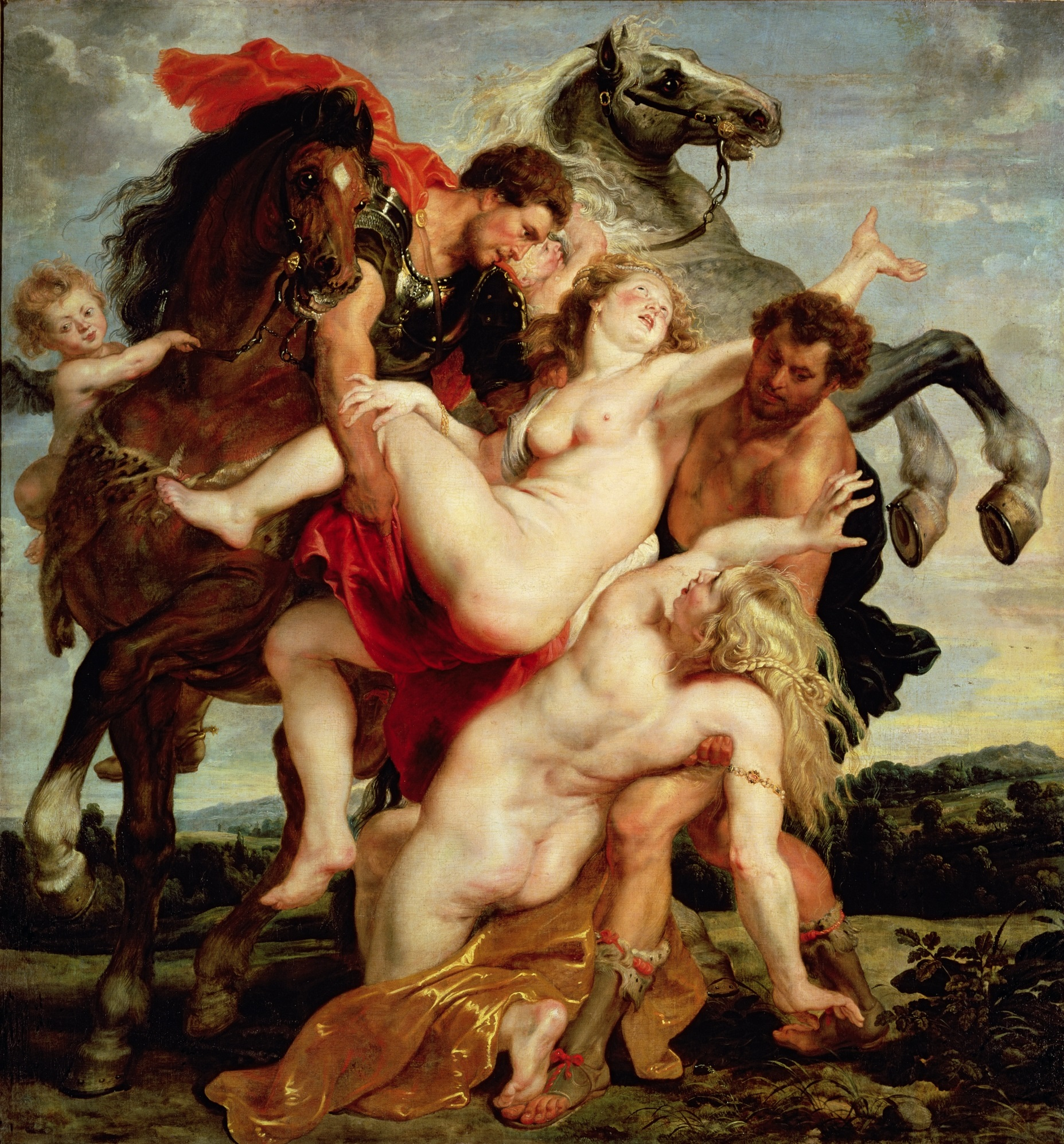
- Artists: Peter Paul Rubens and Jan Wildens
- Year: c. 1618
- Medium: Oil on canvas
- Dimensions: 224 cm × 209 cm (88 in × 82 in)
- Location: Alte Pinakothek, Munich

The Rape of the Daughters of Leucippus is a 1618 painting by Peter Paul Rubens and Jan Wildens. It is displayed at the Alte Pinakothek in Munich.

== History ==
The painting was bought in Antwerp in 1716 by Johann Wilhelm, Elector Palatine. Initially sent to Mannheim, by 1805/06 it had reached Munich.

The landscape specialist Jan Wildens painted the landscape.

== Description ==
The painting depicts the mortal Castor and the immortal Pollux abducting Phoebe and Hilaeira, daughters of Leucippus of Messenia. Castor the horse-tamer is recognisable from his armour, whilst Pollux the boxer is shown with a bare and free upper body. They are also distinguished by their horses—Castor's is well-behaved and supported by a putto, whereas Pollux's is rearing. The putto's black wing shows the twins' ultimate fate.

In the painting, Phoebe and Hilaeira do not have distinguishing attributes. From the literature on Greek myths, however, we learn that Phoebe bore a son, Mnesleos, to Pollux, and Hilaeira bore a son, Anogon, to Castor. It would seem therefore, from the directions of the twins' fixed stares, that the daughter in the lower position, with her back to us, is Phoebe, and the daughter in the upper position, displaying a frontal view, is Hilaeira.

== Bibliography ==
- Alte Pinakothek-Ausgewählte Werke; [Editor: Bayerischen Staatsgemäldesammlungen, Authors: Marcus Dekiert, Nina Schleif], München; Pinakothek-DuMont, 2005, ISBN 978-3-8321-7592-4,
- 50 Klassiker: Gemälde, H. Johannsen, Gerstenberg, 2001, ISBN 380-672-516-0.
