= Marpessa of Aetolia =

Princess in Greek mythology

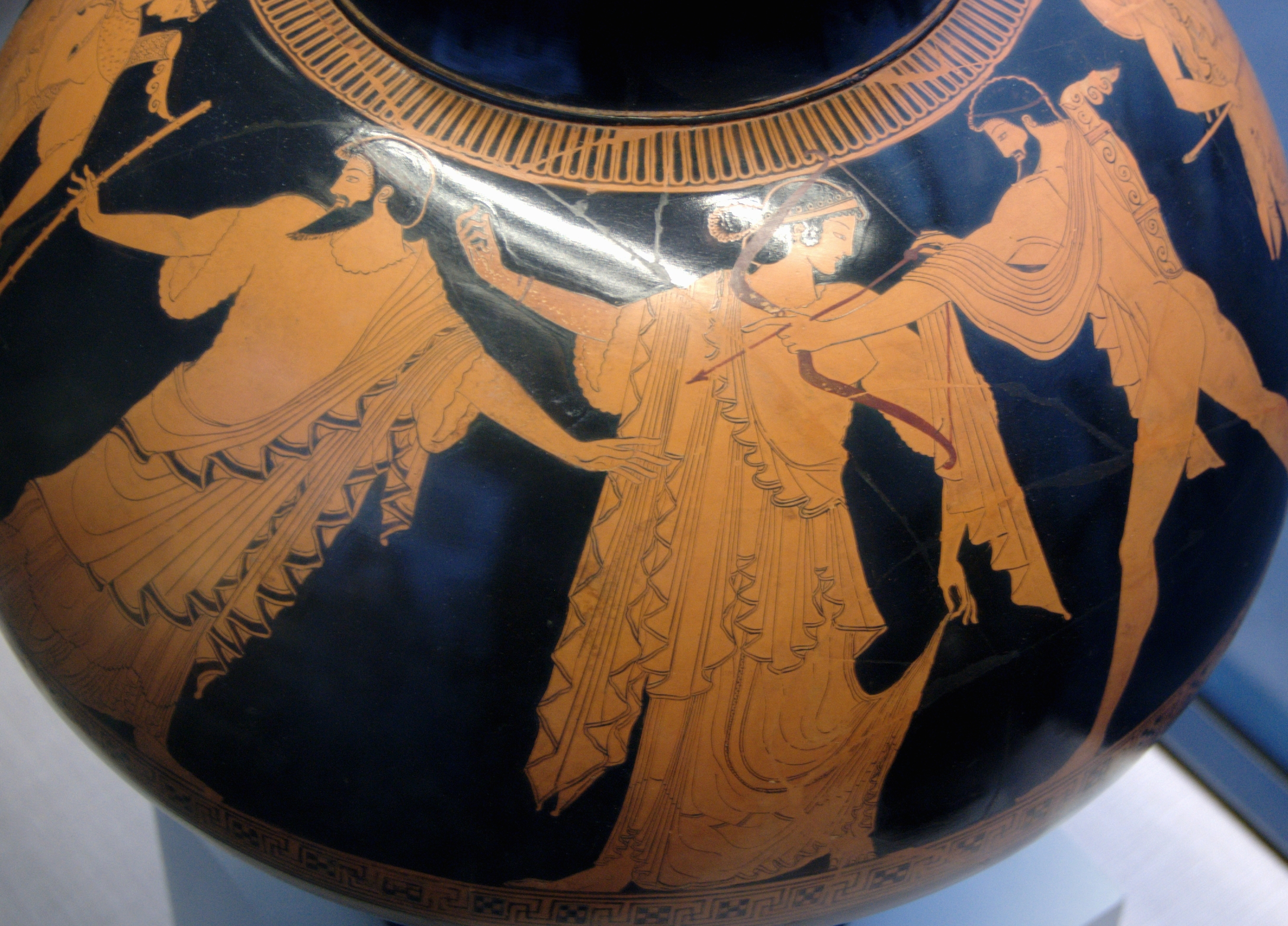
Marpessa and Idas, separated of Apollo by Zeus, Attic red-figure psykter, c. 480 BC, Staatliche Antikensammlungen (Inv. 2417).

Marpessa /ˌmɑːrˈpɛsə/ (Ancient Greek: Μάρπησσα, romanized: Márpēssa, "the robbed one") was an Aetolian princess and a granddaughter of Ares in Greek mythology.

== Family ==
Marpessa was the daughter of King Evenus of Aetolia (son of Ares either by Demonice or Sterope) and princess Alcippe (daughter of King Oenomaus of Pisa). She attracted the attention of the hero Idas as well as the god Apollo. Marpessa eventually married Idas, by whom she begot Cleopatra, the future wife of the hero Meleager.

== Mythology ==
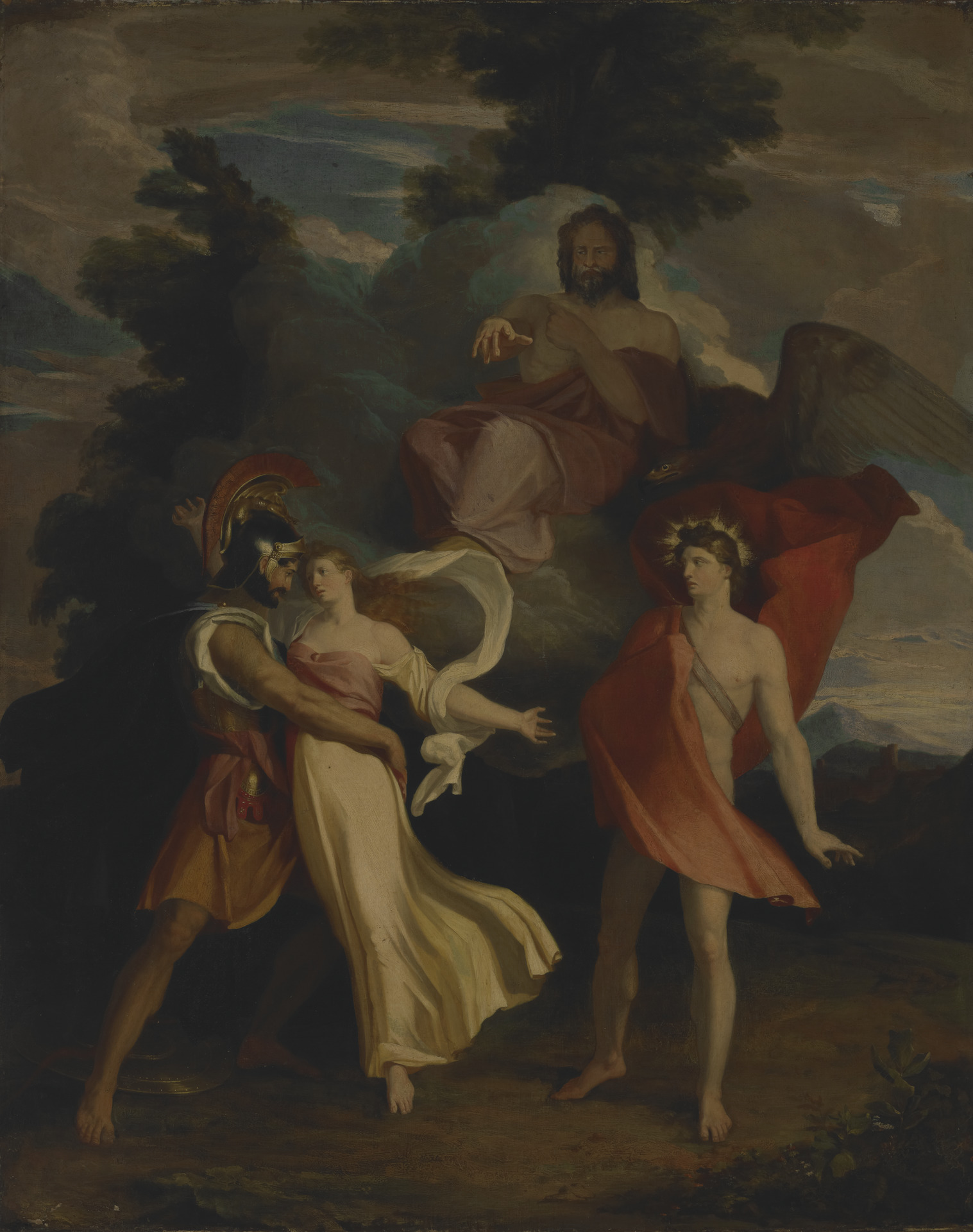
The Judgment of Jupiter by Samuel Finley Breese Morse

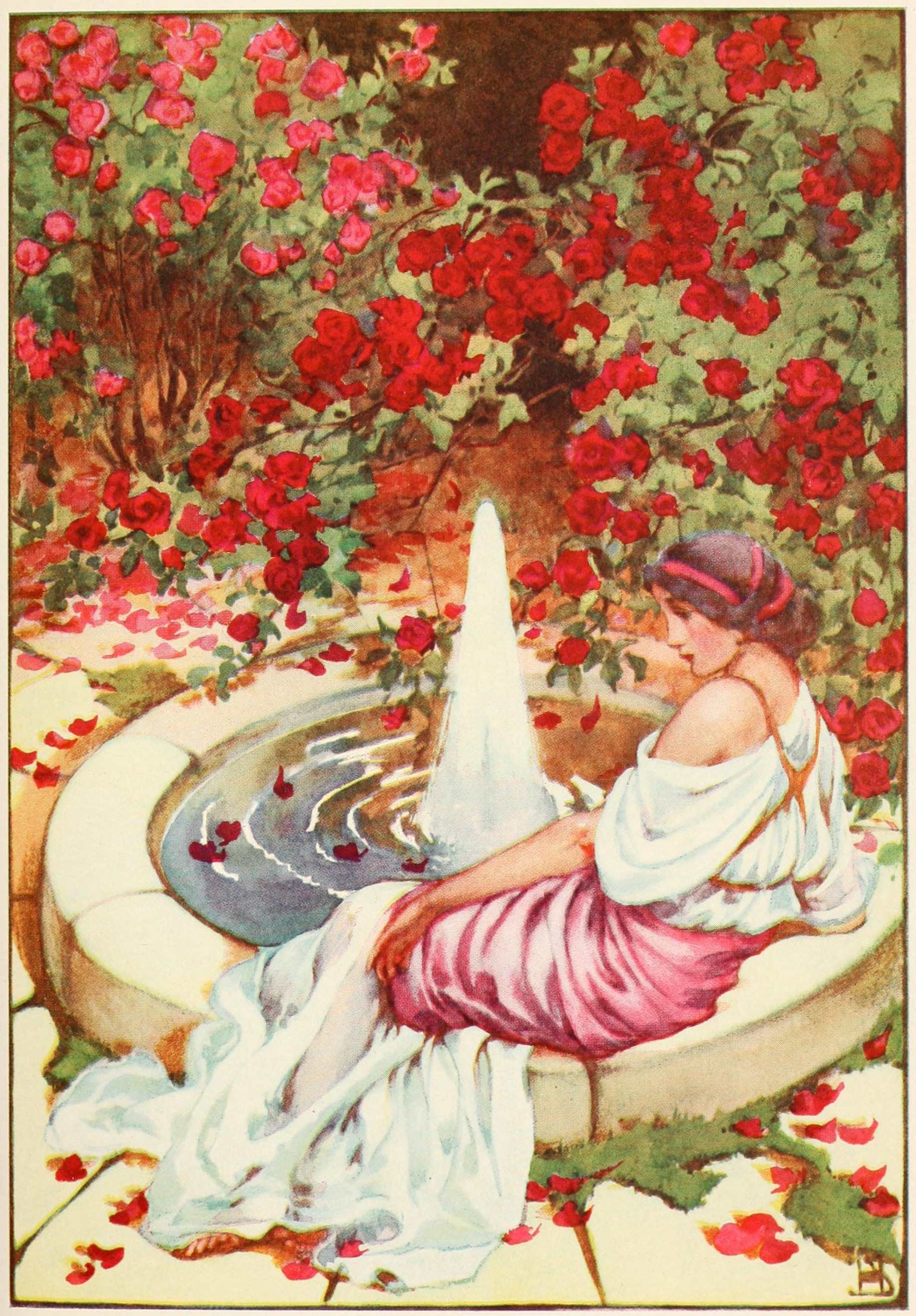
Illustration of Marpessa by Helen Stratton from Jeanie Lang's 1915 A Book of Myths.

The hero Idas, son of King Aphareus, came from Messenia to ask for the hand of Marpessa, described as beautiful by Homer, but Evenus refused his request because he wanted his daughter to remain a virgin. Idas went to his father Poseidon and begged for the use of a winged chariot. After Poseidon consented to his use of the chariot, Idas kidnapped Marpessa and carried her away from a band of dancers to Pleuron in Aetolia. Her father, after chasing the couple for a long time, realized that he could not catch up to them. In his madness, he killed his horses and then drowned himself in the nearby river Lycormas and became immortal. The river was named later after him.

In another version, Apollo also wanted Marpessa and pursued Idas as he carried her away. As the two fought for the girl's hand, Zeus intervened and asked Marpessa to choose between the mortal and the god. Marpessa chose Idas, reasoning to Apollo that had she chosen the god, she would have eventually grown old and lost his affections.

In Homer's version, Marpessa was already married to Idas when Apollo carried her away from her husband. Idas, however, confronted Apollo:

Idas that was mightiest of men that were then upon the face of earth;
who also took his bow to face the king Phoebus Apollo
for the sake of the fair-ankled maid [i.e. Marpessa].

When Idas was slain at the hand of Polydeuces, one of the Dioscuri, Marpessa killed herself.

== Modern use of the name ==
- A 206,000 ton Shell Oil company supertanker (VLCC) was named Marpessa. In December 1969, it became the world's largest oil tanker to sink up to that date. Marpessa had been on its maiden voyage from Europort, Rotterdam, when an explosion ripped through the hull and caused it to founder 50 miles off the west coast of Africa.
