= Lynceus (son of Aphareus) =

Greek mythological figure

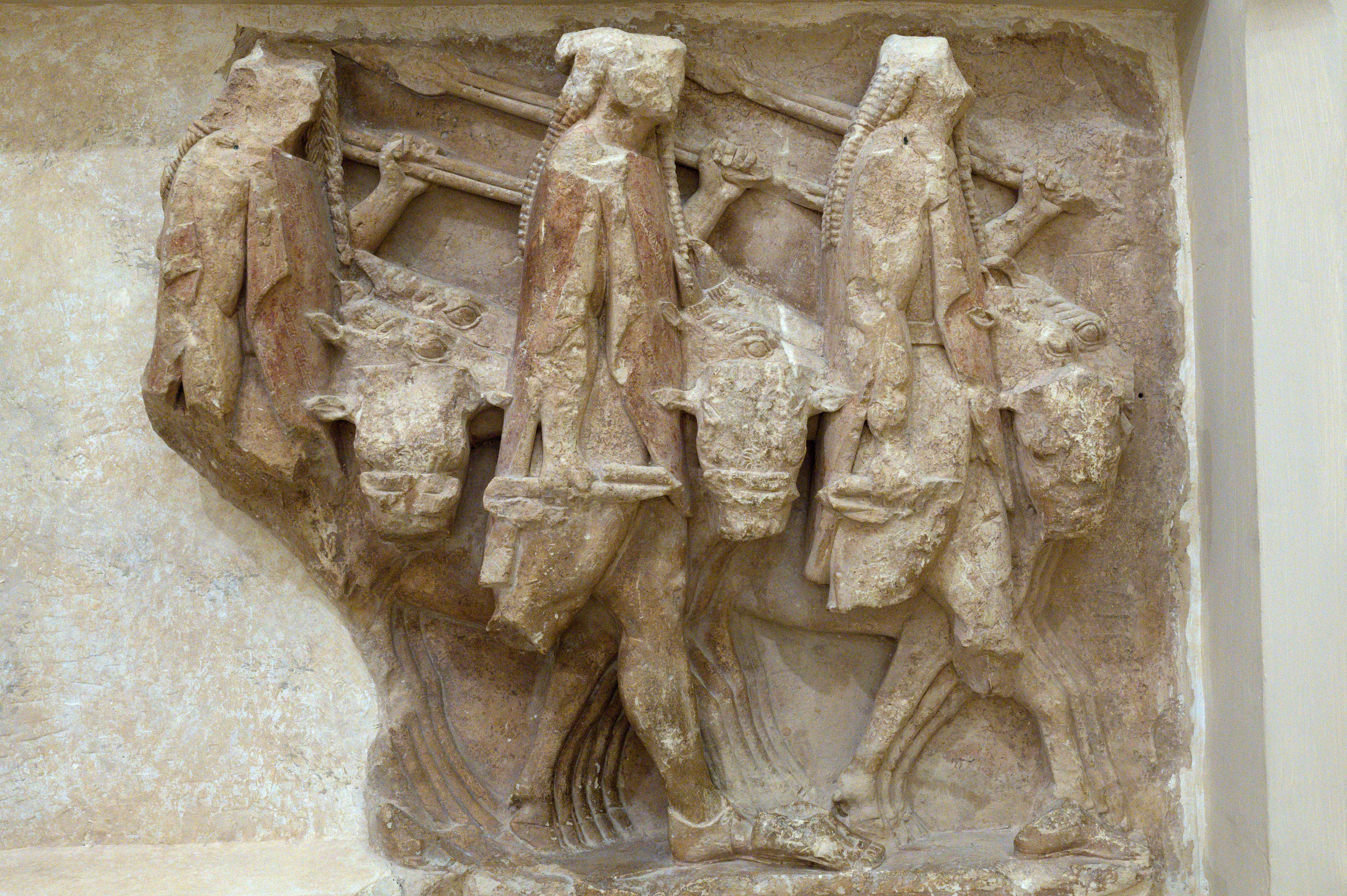
The Dioscuri, Idas and Lynceus take the cattle, metope of the Treasury of Sicyon at Delphi, ca 560 BC.

Lynceus (/ˈlɪnsiːəs, -sjuːs/; Ancient Greek: Λυγκεύς, romanized: Lunkeús, lit. 'lynx-like') is in Greek mythology a Messenian prince and one of the Argonauts who served as a lookout on the Argo. He also participated in the hunt for the Calydonian boar.

== Family ==
Lynceus was a son of Aphareus and Arene or Polydora or Laocoosa (Λαοκόωσα), and thus brother to Idas and Peisus.

== Mythology ==
Lynceus, along with his brother Idas, murdered Castor. He helped Idas to spot and kill Castor, and was in turn killed by Castor's brother Pollux, though he first managed to wound Pollux by throwing a rock. Idas and Lynceus murdered Castor because he and Pollux had kidnapped and married Phoebe and Hilaeira, the daughters of Leucippus, who were betrothed to Lynceus and Idas or possibly their relatives.

Lynceus was said to have excellent sight; enabling him to see through walls, trees, skin and the ground. According to some versions he was also able to see in the dark; in others his reputation for being able to see through the ground was simply a rumor that resulted from his knowledge of geology and gold-mining. This ability has been compared to the real technique of x-ray photography and to Superman's x-ray vision.
