= Anthylla =

Ancient city in Lower Egypt

Coordinates: 30°47′40″N 30°36′01″E

Anthylla (Ancient Greek: Ἄνθυλλα) or Andylla (Ancient Greek: Ἀντυλλα) is an ancient city of Lower Egypt, on the Canopus branch of the Nile River.

Herodotus describes it as a town of some reputation and states that its revenues were assigned to the Egyptian queen for the provision of her shoes, an arrangement that, he notes, continued under Persian rule. Herodotus also mentions that it was close to the "town of Archander" (Ἀρχάνδρου πόλις), also known as "Archandroupolis" (Ἀρχανδρούπολις).

According to Athenaeus, Anthylla provided the queen of Egypt with her furnishings and was renowned for producing some of the best wine in Egyptian vineyards.

It is sometimes thought to be the ancient city of Gynaecopolis.
