= Epaphroditus (disambiguation) =

Epaphroditus is a New Testament figure appearing as an envoy of the Philippian church to assist the Apostle Paul.

Epaphroditus or Epaphroditos (Ἐπαφρόδιτος, 'beloved-of-Aphrodite') may refer to:

== People ==
- Epaphroditus (freedman of Augustus) (1st century BC), reportedly failed to prevent the suicide of Cleopatra
- Epaphroditus (freedman of Nero) (1st century), reportedly failed to prevent the suicide of Nero
- Marcus Mettius Epaphroditus (1st century), Ancient Greek grammarian
- Epaphroditus Champion (1756–1834), American politician and land owner
- Epaphroditus Marsh (1637–1719), Irish politician
- Epaphroditus Ransom (1798–1859), American politician and jurist

== Other uses ==
- Epaphroditus (fly), a genus of Asilidae
