= Aegyptius =

Character in Greek mythology

- Ithacan elder
- Egyptius in the 1968 miniseries Odissea (dal Poema di Omero)
- Other names: Aegyptus, Ægyptus, Aiguptios, Aigýptios, Aigyptios, Egyptius
- Region: Ithaca
- Offspring: Euronymus, Antiphus, two other sons

In Greek mythology, Aegyptius (Αἰγύπτιος, Aigýptios) was an elderly Ithacan hero of great experience.

== Description ==
Aegyptius was bent with old age.

== Genealogy ==
Aegyptius fathered four sons. One was Euronymus, one of the suitors of Penelope. Another was Antiphus, the spearman companion of Odysseus who was slain and eaten by Polyphemus, the Cyclops. Aegyptius never forgot his dear Antiphus, lamenting and grieving over him. His other two sons tended the family farms.

== Mythology ==
Illustration by Willy Pogany of Peisenor handing Telemachus the staff at the assembly, from The Adventures of Odysseus and The Tales of Troy by Padraic Colum

In the twentieth year after the beginning of the Trojan War, Telemachus, the son of Odysseus and Penelope, summoned the Achaeans of Ithaca to the first assembly since Odysseus left for the war. Aegyptius and the others gathered swiftly at the meeting-place. When Telemachus arrived and sat in his father's place, the elders, fell back in amazement. The attendees were unaware it was Telemachus who had called the assembly. Aegyptius was the first to speak, wondering aloud who had called the meeting and for what purpose. Aegyptius believed he who had summoned the meeting seemed a blessed, good man and prayed that Zeus would bring his desires to fulfilment. Telemachus, taking his words as a good omen, stood in the middle of the assembly and was handed the talking staff by Peisenor, his herald. He turned to Aegyptius and revealed that he had called the assembly. He told the assembly that he had called the meeting to address the suitors of Penelope and their abuse of xenia, guest-friendship, having eaten and drunk their supplies to excess while pressuring his mother to wed one of them. Telemachus addressed the assembly and entreated the suitors to stop.

== Sources ==
- Homer (2016). "Book Two". The Odyssey. Oxford World's Classics. Translated by Verity, Anthony. Great Clarendon Street, Oxford, England: Oxford University Press. ISBN 978-0-19-873647-9.
- Homer (2016). "Book Nineteen". The Odyssey. Oxford World's Classics. Translated by Verity, Anthony. Great Clarendon Street, Oxford, England: Oxford University Press. ISBN 978-0-19-873647-9.
