= Leucippus (son of Perieres) =

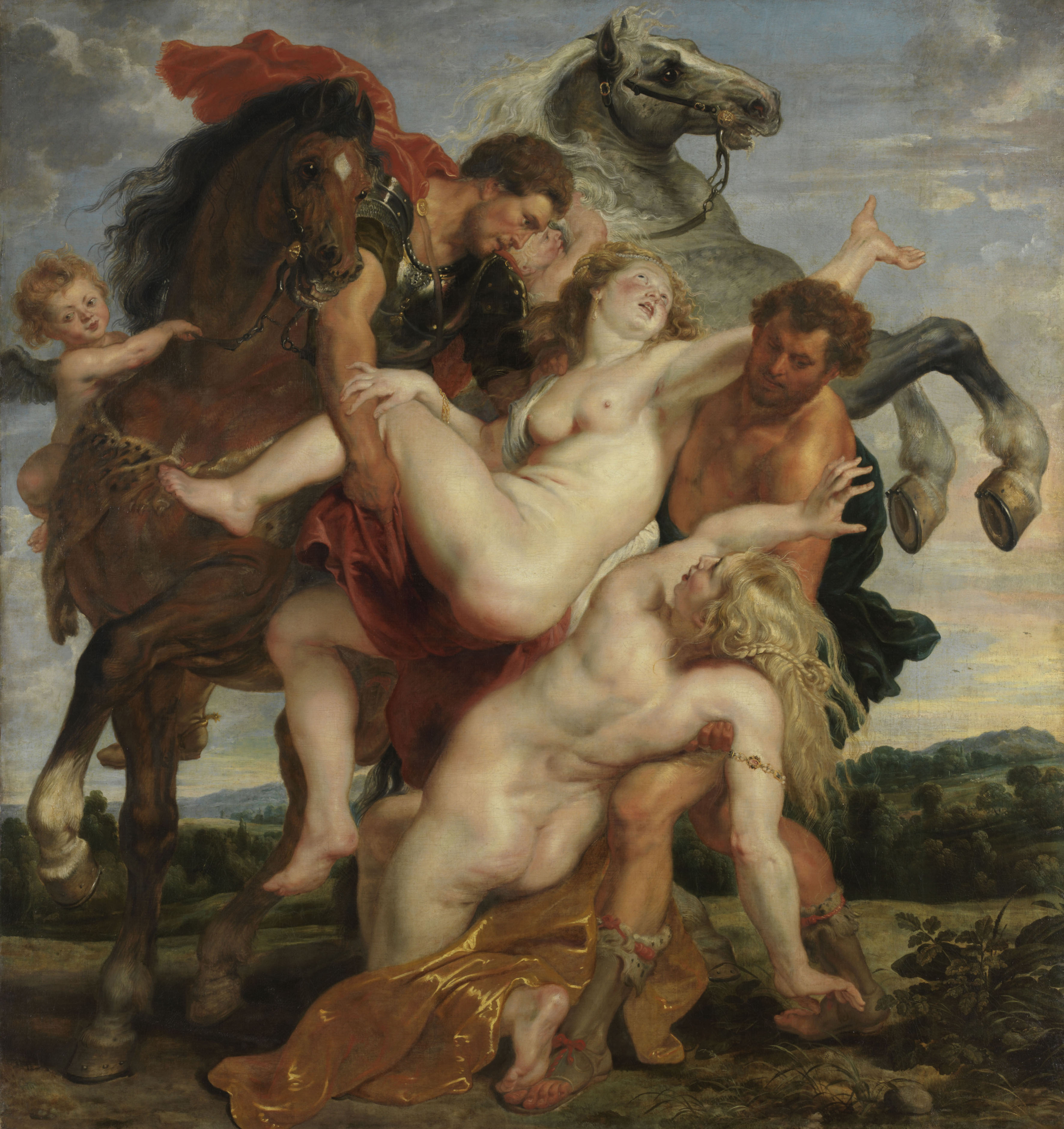
"The Rape of the Daughters of Leucippus" by Rubens.

In Greek mythology, Leucippus (Ancient Greek: Λεύκιππος, romanized: Leúkippos, lit. 'white horse') was a Messenian prince. The Boeotian town of Leuctra is said to have derived its name from him.

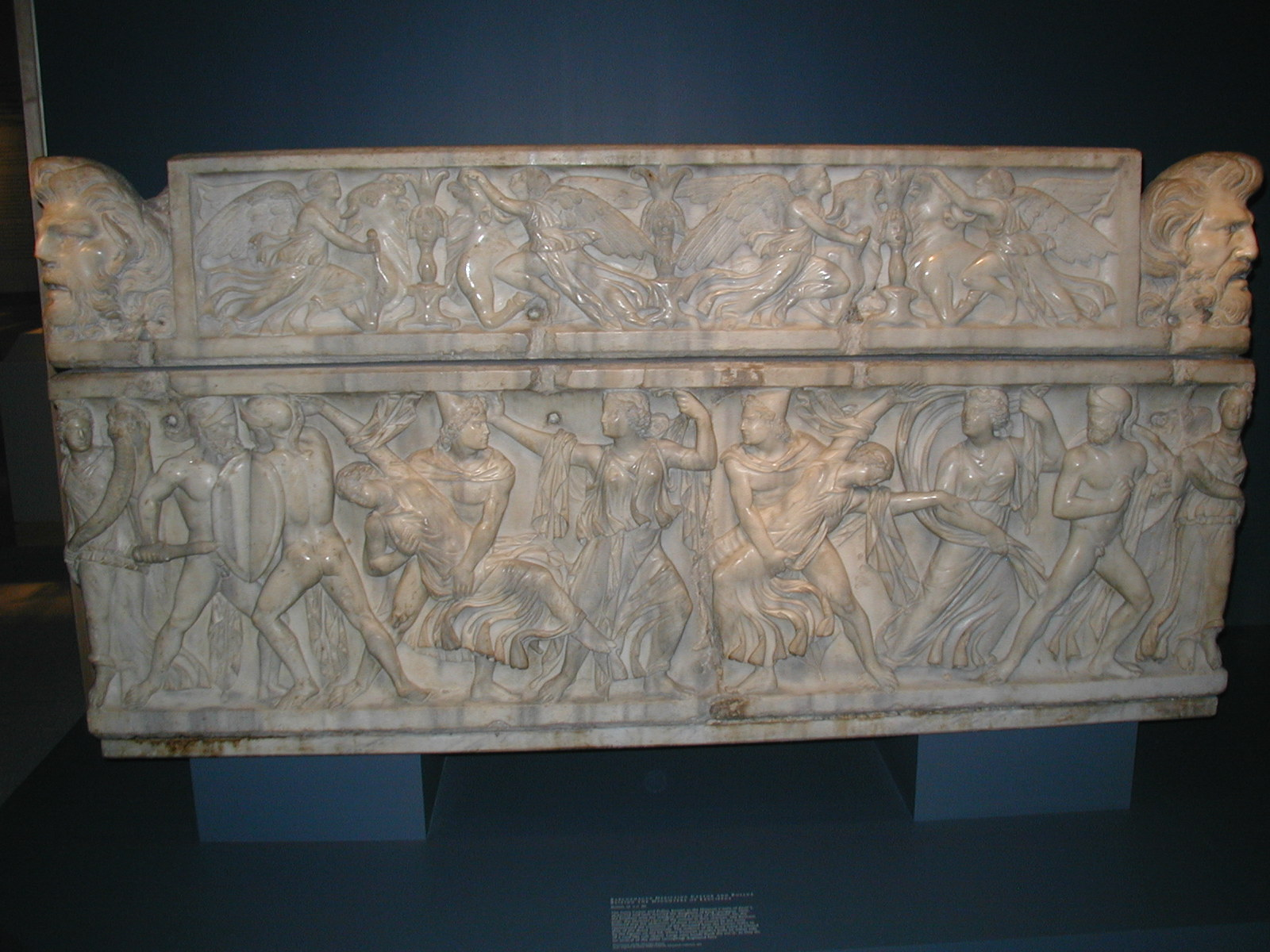
Roman sarcophagus with Castor and Pollux seizing the daughters of Leucippus, c. 160 CE.

== Family ==
Leucippus was the son of Gorgophone and Perieres, and brother of Aphareus, amongst others.

He was the father of three daughters, each borne by his wife Philodice, daughter of Inachus: two Leucippides (Phoebe and Hilaera), and Arsinoe, mother of Asclepius and Eriopis begotten by the god Apollo.

== Mythology ==
It is said that Leucippus together with his brother Aphareus inherited their father's kingdom upon his death, but the latter kept the greater authority than the former.

Castor and Polydeuces abducted and married Leucippus' daughters, Phoebe and Hilaera. In return, Idas and Lynceus, nephews of Leucippus and rival suitors, killed Castor. Polydeuces was granted immortality by Zeus, and further persuaded Zeus to share his gift with Castor.
