= Polydora =

Ancient Greek female name

Polydora (/ˌpɒlɪˈdɔːrə/; Ancient Greek: Πολυδώρα, romanized: Poludṓra in Attic and Πολυδώρη in Ionic, means 'many-gifts' or 'the shapely') was the name of several characters in Greek mythology:

- Polydora, the 'handsome' Oceanid, one of the 3,000 water-nymph daughters of the Titans Oceanus and his sister-spouse Tethys.
- Polydora, a nymph and one of the 50 Danaïdes, daughter of King Danaus. She was the mother of King Dryops of Oeta, by the river-gods Spercheus or Peneus.
- Polydora, wife of Aphareus of Messenia and thus, the possible mother of his children, Idas, Lynceus and Peisus. In some accounts, the consort of Aphareus was called Arene or Laocoosa (Λαοκόωσα).
- Polydora, daughter of Peleus and Antigone, daughter of King Eurytion of Phthia. She married Borus, son of Perieres, who wooed her with large dowry, but regardless of this, Polydora became the mother of Menesthius by Spercheios. In another account, Polydora's mother was called Polymela and her brother was Achilles.
- Polydora, daughter of Perieres and wife of Peleus. In some accounts, she became the mother of Menesthius by Spercheus.
- Polydora, daughter of Meleager. She was married to Protesilaus, and after his death she was so affected by grief that she took her own life.
- Polydora, one of the Amazons.
- Polydora, one of the maidservants of Odysseus who was loyal to the suitors of Penelope.

== See also ==
- Polydorus

== Bibliography ==
- Antoninus Liberalis, The Metamorphoses of Antoninus Liberalis translated by Francis Celoria (Routledge 1992). Online version at the Topos Text Project.
- Apollodorus, The Library with an English Translation by Sir James George Frazer, F.B.A., F.R.S. in 2 Volumes, Cambridge, MA, Harvard University Press; London, William Heinemann Ltd. 1921. ISBN 0-674-99135-4. Online version at the Perseus Digital Library. Greek text available from the same website.
- Hesiod, Theogony from The Homeric Hymns and Homerica with an English Translation by Hugh G. Evelyn-White, Cambridge, MA., Harvard University Press; London, William Heinemann Ltd. 1914. Online version at the Perseus Digital Library. Greek text available from the same website.
- Homer, The Iliad with an English Translation by A.T. Murray, Ph.D. in two volumes. Cambridge, MA., Harvard University Press; London, William Heinemann, Ltd. 1924. ISBN 978-0674995796. Online version at the Perseus Digital Library.
- Homer, Homeri Opera in five volumes. Oxford, Oxford University Press. 1920. ISBN 978-0198145318. Greek text available at the Perseus Digital Library.
- Kerényi, Carl, The Gods of the Greeks, Thames and Hudson, London, 1951.
- Pausanias, Description of Greece with an English Translation by W.H.S. Jones, Litt.D., and H.A. Ormerod, M.A., in 4 Volumes. Cambridge, MA, Harvard University Press; London, William Heinemann Ltd. 1918. ISBN 0-674-99328-4. Online version at the Perseus Digital Library
- Pausanias, Graeciae Descriptio. 3 vols. Leipzig, Teubner. 1903. Greek text available at the Perseus Digital Library.
- Theocritus, Idylls from The Greek Bucolic Poets translated by Edmonds, J M. Loeb Classical Library Volume 28. Cambridge, MA. Harvard University Press. 1912. Online version at theoi.com
- Theocritus, Idylls edited by R. J. Cholmeley, M.A. London. George Bell & Sons. 1901. Greek text available at the Perseus Digital Library.
