= Archias =

Archias (Ancient Greek: Ἀρχίας) is a masculine given name which may refer to:

== Statesmen ==
- Archias of Corinth, founder of Syracuse in 734 or 733 BC
- Archias of Thebes, Theban polemarch and tyrant in 379 BC
- Archias of Pella, Macedonian trierarch, geographer
- Archias of Thurii, Thuriian actor, officer of Antipater
- Archias of Cyprus, governor of Cyprus in 2nd century BCE

== Others ==
- Archias of Alexandria, Roman-era grammarian, teacher of Marcus Mettius Epaphroditus
- Archias of Macedon, Archias of Byzantium, Archias of Mytilene, Archias the younger in Greek anthology
- Archias, a Spartan whom Herodotus mentions as falling in the Spartan attack on Samos in 525 BC.
- Archias, grandson of the above, whom Herodotus mentions personally meeting in Pitane.
- Archias of Corinth, a shipbuilder, architect of the Syracusia around 240 BC
