= Phoebe (daughter of Leucippus) =

Daughter of Leucippus, mythical figure honored at Sparta

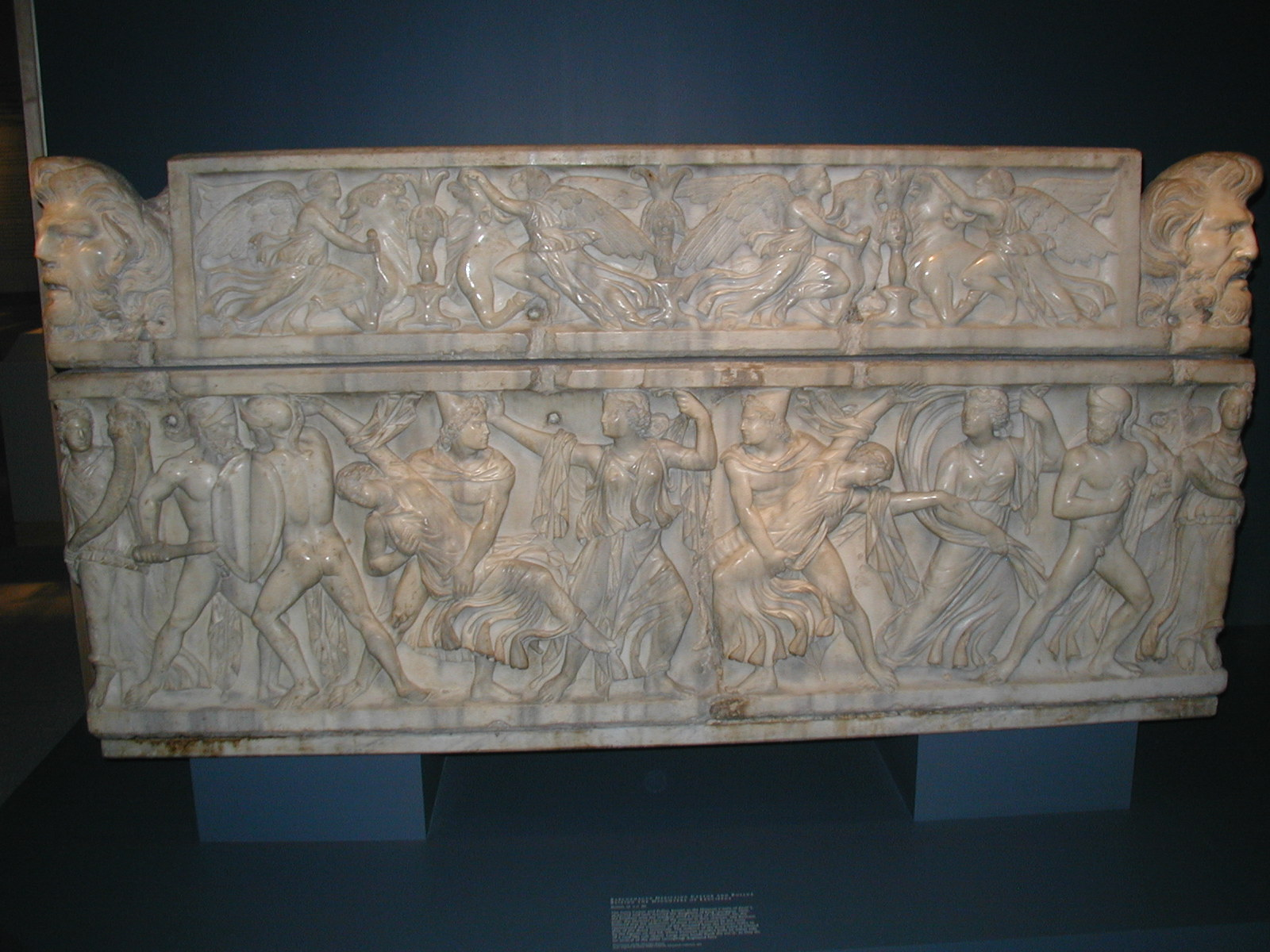
Roman sarcophagus with Castor and Pollux seizing Phoebe and Hilaeira, ca. 160 AD

In Greek mythology, Phoebe (/ˈfiːbi/ FEE-bee; Ancient Greek: Φοίβη, romanized: Phoíbē, associated with φοῖβος phoîbos, "shining") was a Messenian princess.

== Family ==
Phoebe was the daughter of Leucippus and Philodice, daughter of Inachus. She and her sister Hilaera are commonly referred to as Leucippides (that is, "daughters of Leucippus"). In another account, they were the daughters of Apollo. Phoebe married Pollux and bore him a son, named either Mnesileos or Mnasinous.

== Mythology ==
Phoebe and Hilaera were priestesses of Athena and Artemis, and betrothed to Idas and Lynceus, the sons of Aphareus. Castor and Pollux were charmed by their beauty and carried them off. When Idas and Lynceus tried to rescue their brides-to-be they were both slain, but Castor himself fell. Pollux persuaded Zeus to allow him to share his immortality with his brother.
