= Hilaeira =

Princess in ancient Greek mythology

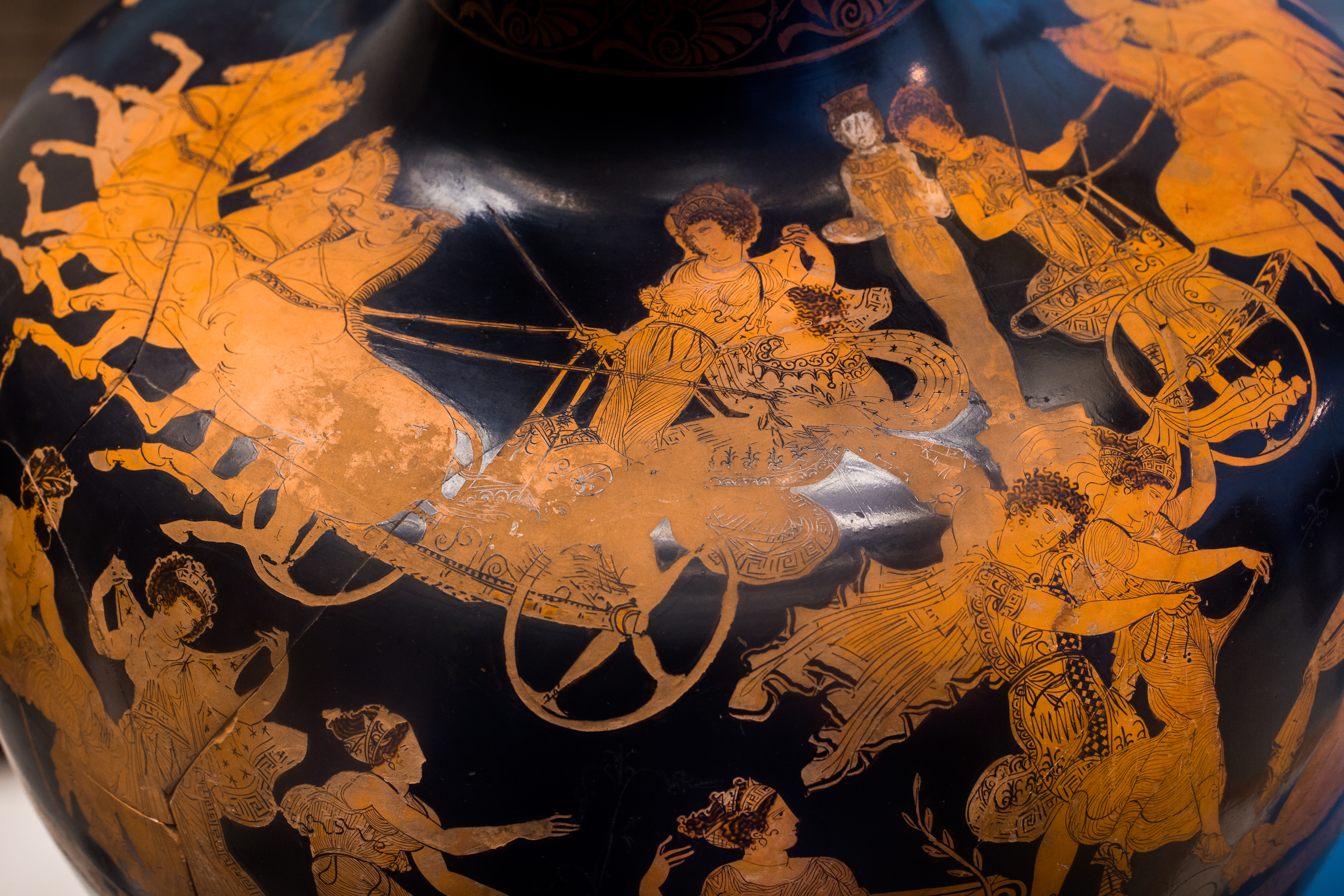
Castor and Pollux snatching the Leucippides, red-figure hydria by the Meidias Painter, British Museum.

In Greek mythology, Hilaera (Ancient Greek: Ἱλάειρα; also Ilaeira) was a Messenian princess. Stephanus of Byzantium called her Elaeira (Ἐλάειρα).

== Family ==
Hilaera was a daughter of Leucippus and Philodice, daughter of Inachus. She and her sister Phoebe are commonly referred to as Leucippides (that is, "daughters of Leucippus"). In another account, they were the daughters of Apollo. Hilaera married Castor and bore him a son, named either Anogon or Anaxis. According to one source, they had a daughter as well, Aulothoe.

== Mythology ==
Hilaera and Phoebe were priestesses of Artemis and Athena, and betrothed to Lynceus and Idas, the sons of Aphareus. Castor and Pollux were charmed by their beauty and carried them off. When Idas and Lynceus tried to rescue their brides-to-be they were both slain, but Castor himself fell. Pollux persuaded Zeus to allow him to share his immortality with his brother.

== Cultural depictions ==
Hilaera and Phoebe are both portrayed in the painting The Rape of the Daughters of Leucippus.
