= Eioneus =

Set of mythological characters

In Greek mythology, Eioneus (/aɪˈoʊniəs/; Ancient Greek: Ἠιονεύς, romanized: Eioneús) is a name attributed to the following individuals:

- Eioneus, the Perrhaebian father of Dia, whose name is often confused with that of Deioneus.
- Eioneus, son of Magnes and Philodice, and brother of Eurynomus. He was one of the suitors of Hippodamia and like all the other suitors before Pelops, he was killed by the princess' father, King Oenomaus of Pisa.
- Eioneus, son of the sea-god Proteus and father of the Phrygian king Dymas, father of Hecuba.
- Eioneus, the presumed mythological eponym of the Thracian city of Eion. This character was the father of Rhesus, according to Homer. One source identifies him with Strymon, who was more commonly known as father of Rhesus.
- Eioneus, a Greek warrior in the Trojan War who was killed by Hector using a sharp spear which smote his neck.
- Eioneus or Eion, a Trojan warrior who was killed by Neoptolemus.

The name Eioneus derives from the root word eion (ἠιών), which means "shore," "beach," or "riverbank".

== See also ==
- Naming citation for Jovian asteroid 15440 Eioneus
