= Arene (mythology) =

In Greek mythology, Arene (Ancient Greek: Ἀρήνη, romanized: Arēnē, lit. 'holy one'), also called Arena and Arenae, may refer to two distinct women:

- Arene, a Messenian queen who was born to King Oebalus of Sparta and Gorgophone, the daughter of Perseus. She went on to marry her stepbrother, Aphareus, who was the son of Gorgophone and King Perieres of Messenia. When her husband Aphareus ascended to the throne of Messenia following the passing of his father, Perieres, the former founded a new city on the west coast of the region and named it after Arene. By Aphareus, Arene became the mother of Idas, Lynceus and Pisus. Many others said that Idas was instead begotten by Arene to Poseidon. Other account relates that Aphareus's wife was called Polydora or Laocoosa.
- Arene, in an alternate version of the Trojan War aftermath, a daughter of Polyphemus who ruled a portion of Sicily. After initial hostilities and violence, the latter granted Odysseus and his surviving men a truce which eventually broke when one of the hero's crew members — named Alphenor — fell desperately in love with Arene. The Greek sailor attempted to kidnap and carry her off but when her father discovered the plot, Polyphemus recovered her and drove the Greeks away in anger. In other account, Arene and Alphenor were called Elpe and Leion, respectively.
