= Archander =

Archander (Ancient Greek: Ἄρχανδρος) was a son of Achaeus and brother of Architeles. Together with his brother he carried on a war against the king Lamedon. He married Scaea, daughter of Danaus, and settled in Argos. He named his son Metanastes (Μετανάστης), meaning settler/migrant.

According to one tradition the Achaeans in Peloponnesus took this name because Archander and his brother acquired such influence at Argos that they called the people Achaeans after their father Achaeus.

According to ancient writers, a city in Egypt called "city/town of Archander" (Ἀρχάνδρου πόλις) or "Archandroupolis" (Ἀρχανδρούπολις), most likely took its name from this Archander. The city was close to Anthylla.
