= Gynaecopolis =

Ancient Egyptian city

Gynaecopolis (Ancient Greek: Γυναικόπολις) or Gynaecospolis (Ancient Greek: Γυναικόσπολις); "Woman's city" or "Women's City"; sometimes translated as "Wife's City". It was, according to ancient Greek sources, the name of two cities: one Phoenician and one in Egypt. Nothing is known about the city in Phoenicia. The Egyptian town was located on the west side of the Nile, opposite Naucratis.

Strabo calls the Egyptian town Γυναικῶν πόλις.

== Name ==
Ancient Greek sources offer three explanations for the city's name in Egypt:

1. During an enemy attack, the city's women successfully defended it while the men were away.
2. A nomarch's wife, whose children had been kidnapped by the king, took up arms alongside her children, attacked the king, and emerged victorious.
3. When the people of Naucratis sailed upstream on the river but were prevented from disembarking by the Egyptians, they were struck with cowardice, yet did not stop their journey.

Gynaecopolis Per Nebet Imau
- Interactive map of Gynaecopolis
- Coordinates: 30°47′40″N 30°36′01″E

== History ==
Gynaecopolis was known in Ancient Egypt as 'Per Nebet Imau'. This city was the capital of the Gynaecopolite nome mentioned by Strabo, and coins having its impress in the age of Hadrian are still present. Some geographers believe the city of Gynaecopolis is actually the ancient city of Anthylla, even though the former city was found south of what was presumed to be Anthylla. It may have been in the area of Kom el-Hisn.

== Other information ==
- Herodotus mentions that it used to furnish the ancient Egyptian queens with sandals and other feminine goods.
- It was assigned by Persian kings of Egypt to their queens, to provide them with sandals or girdles.
