= Marcus Mettius Epaphroditus =

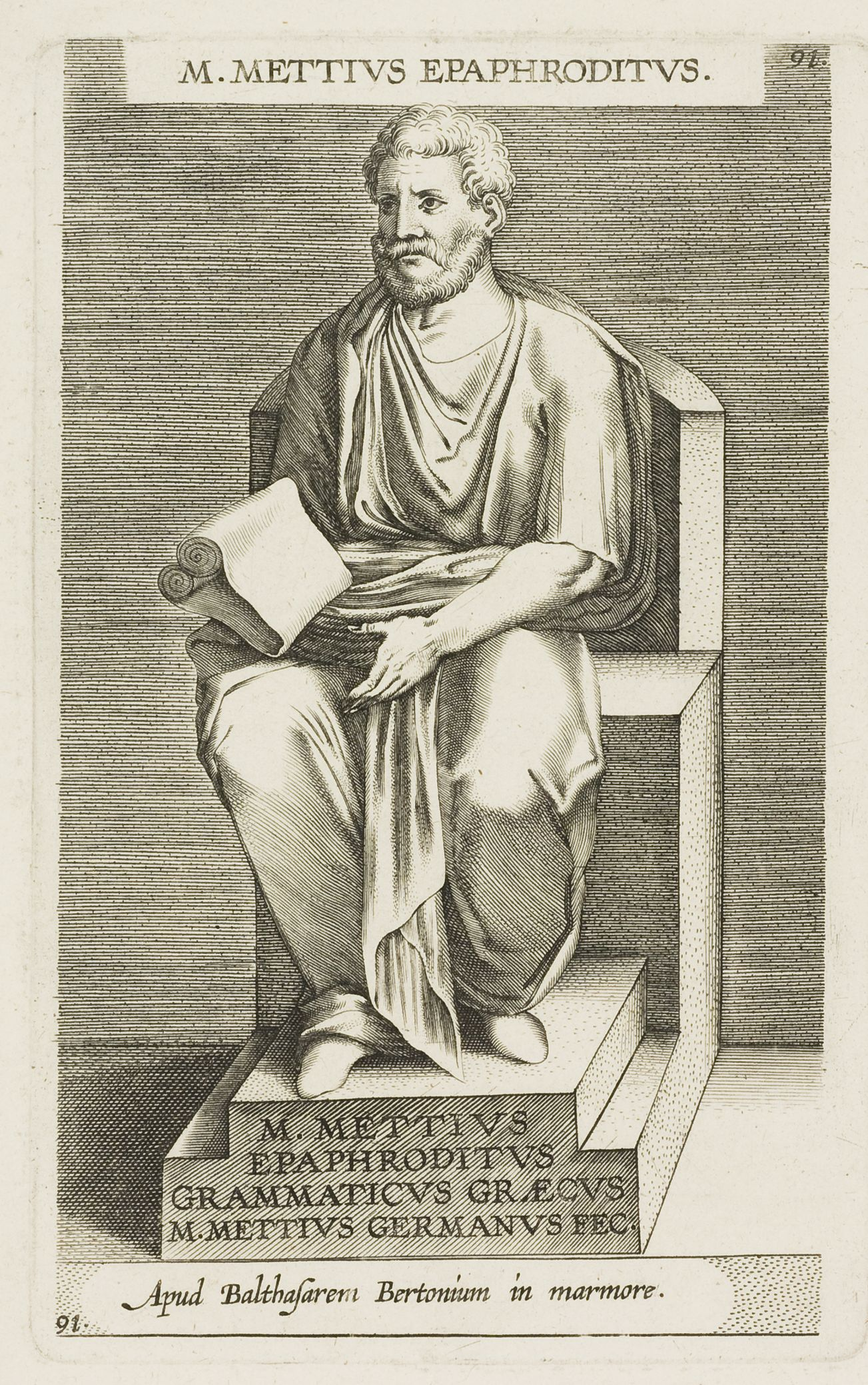
Mettius Epaphroditus (depiction ca. 1600, after a statue "apud Balthasarem Bertonium in marmore")

Marcus Mettius Epaphroditus (Ancient Greek: Ἐπαφρόδιτος) of Chaeroneia was an Ancient Greek grammarian of the 1st century.

Epaphroditus was a disciple of Archias of Alexandria, and became the slave and afterwards the freedman of Modestus, the prefect of Egypt, whose son Pitelinus had been educated by Epaphroditus. After having obtained his liberty, he went to Rome, where he resided in the reign of Nero and down to the time of Nerva, and enjoyed a very high reputation for his learning. He was extremely fond of books, and is said to have collected a library of 30,000 valuable books. He died of dropsy at the age of seventy-five.

The Suda, from whom this account is derived, does not specify any work of our grammarian, but concludes by merely saying that he left behind him many good works. We know, however, from other sources, the titles of some grammatical works and commentaries: for example, on Homer's Iliad and Odyssey, an exêgêsis eis omêron kai pindaron, a commentary on Hesiod's "Shield of Heracles," and on the Aitia of Callimachus, which is frequently referred to by Stephanus of Byzantium and the Scholiast on Aeschylus. He is also mentioned several times in the Venetian Scholia on the Iliad.

== See also ==
- Epaphroditus (disambiguation), for other people with this name
