= Anaxias =

Greek mythical character

Anaxias (Ancient Greek: Ἀναξίας means 'command, behest') or Anaxis (Ἄναξις means 'bringing up, raising up') was in Greek and Roman mythology a son of Castor and Hilaeira, and cousin of Mnasinus, with whom he is usually mentioned. The temple of the Dioscuri at Argos contained also the statues of these two sons of the Dioscuri, and on the throne of Amyclae both were represented riding on horseback. In some accounts, he was called Anogon.
