= Archias of Alexandria =

Ancient Greek writer

Archias of Alexandria (Ancient Greek: Ἀρχίας ὁ Ἀλεξανδρεύς) was a man of ancient Egypt who worked as a grammarian. He probably lived about the time of the Roman emperor Augustus, as we know he was the teacher of Marcus Mettius Epaphroditus, a grammarian of the 1st century CE. Little of his works remain; what fragments there are indicate his interest in grammar and etymology.
