= Marpessa =

Various figures in Greek mythology

In Greek mythology, Marpessa /ˌmɑːrˈpɛsə/ (Ancient Greek: Μάρπησσα, romanized: Márpēssa, "the robbed one" or "snatcher" or "gobbler") may refer to:

- Marpessa, an Aetolian princess and daughter of Evenus.
- Marpessa or Marpesia, an Amazon queen.
- Marpessa, a Theban woman whose betrothed, Phylleus, was killed by Tydeus during the campaign of the Seven against Thebes.
- Marpessa, the woman who led the women of Tegea to defend the city during a war from an invasion led by the Spartan king Charilaus. Marpessa's weapon was later put in plain sight in the Temple of Athena Alea, a focal point for the local population in Tegea, showing the importance of this story and the character of Marpessa in the collective memory of the Tegeans.
- Marpessa (Paros), a town of ancient Greece in Paros

== General and cited references ==
- Apollodorus, The Library with an English Translation by Sir James George Frazer, F.B.A., F.R.S. in 2 Volumes, Cambridge, MA, Harvard University Press; London, William Heinemann Ltd. 1921. ISBN 0-674-99135-4. Online version at the Perseus Digital Library. Greek text available from the same website.
- Graves, Robert, The Greek Myths, Harmondsworth, London, England, Penguin Books, 1960. ISBN 978-0143106715
- Graves, Robert, The Greek Myths: The Complete and Definitive Edition. Penguin Books Limited. 2017. ISBN 978-0-241-98338-6, 024198338X
- Homer, The Iliad with an English Translation by A.T. Murray, Ph.D. in two volumes. Cambridge, MA., Harvard University Press; London, William Heinemann, Ltd. 1924. ISBN 978-0674995796. Online version at the Perseus Digital Library.
- Homer, Homeri Opera in five volumes. Oxford, Oxford University Press. 1920. ISBN 978-0198145318. Greek text available at the Perseus Digital Library.
- Pausanias, Description of Greece with an English Translation by W. H. S. Jones, Litt.D., and H.A. Ormerod, M.A., in 4 Volumes. Cambridge, MA, Harvard University Press; London, William Heinemann Ltd. 1918. ISBN 0-674-99328-4. Online version at the Perseus Digital Library
- Pausanias, Graeciae Descriptio. 3 vols. Leipzig, Teubner. 1903. Greek text available at the Perseus Digital Library.
- Publius Papinius Statius, The Thebaid translated by John Henry Mozley. Loeb Classical Library Volumes. Cambridge, MA, Harvard University Press; London, William Heinemann Ltd. 1928. Online version at the Topos Text Project.
- Publius Papinius Statius, The Thebaid. Vol I-II. John Henry Mozley. London: William Heinemann; New York: G.P. Putnam's Sons. 1928. Latin text available at the Perseus Digital Library.
