= Archias of Cyprus =

2nd-century BC Egyptian satrap

Archias (Ancient Greek: Ἀρχίας) was the governor (strategos) of Cyprus under Ptolemy VI Philometor in the 2nd century BCE.

Little is known of Archias's life. He traveled with Ptolemy to Rome in 164, and took his post in Cyprus in 163. The Seleucids had always had their eye on the island, and in 155 Demetrius I Soter gave Archias a bribe of 500 talents in order to betray the island. Archias was caught, and put on trial for this. Before the trial could be resolved in a guilty or innocent verdict, Archias hanged himself. While 155 is traditionally considered his date of death, various scholars have put the date of his suicide anywhere between 158 and 154.

This event was said to have inspired the adage of the Dutch Renaissance humanist Erasmus, "Inanium inania consilia" ("futile advice from futile people"), said when a person of low intelligence is foiled in their plans.
