= Pisus =

In Greek mythology, Pisus (Ancient Greek: Πῖσός or Πίσον means ‘meadows’), also Peisus or Peisos (Πεῖσος), may refer to three different characters:

- Pisus, a Messenian prince who later founded Pisa in Elis. He was the son of King Perieres of Messenia and possibly Gorgophone, daughter of Perseus. In one version of the myth, Pisus’ parents were instead Aphareus, another Messenian king, and Arene, and his brothers were Idas and Lynceus, rivals of the Dioscuri. He was one of the first people (the others being Pelops and Heracles) to have established the festival and the contest at Olympia. Also, Pisus founded and instituted Zeus’ worship on the area.
- Pisus, king of the Celts and son of Apollo. He was the reputed founder of Pisa in Etruria after he had waged war with the Samnites and received their widowed queen who succeeded to the government after the death of her husband.
- Pisus, a Trojan prince and son of Priam. Alongside his brother Evander, he was captured in battle by Ajax the Greater or Diomedes and sacrificed at the funeral of Patroclus by Achilles.
