= Philodice (mythology) =

In Greek mythology, Philodice or Philodike (Ancient Greek: Φιλοδίκη) was the name of the following figures:

- Philodice, an Argive naiad, daughter of Inachus, river-king of Argos. She was the wife of Leucippus of Messenia by whom she became the mother of Hilaeira and Phoebe, and possibly Arsinoe. Philodice was considered the sister of Phoroneus, Io and Aegialeus.
- Philodice, also Phylodice (Φυλοδίκη), wife of Magnes, king of Magnesia and mother of his sons, Eurynomus and Eioneus. Otherwise the wife of Magnes was called Meliboea by Eustathius.
