= Eunomus =

Eunomus may refer to:

Biology

- a bird, the dusky thrush (Turdus eunomus)

Geography

- the ancient city also called Euromus

History

- Eunomus, king of Sparta
- Eunomus, an Athenian Admiral during the Corinthian War.
