= Aphareus (son of Perieres) =

In Greek mythology, Aphareus (Ancient Greek: Ἀφαρεύς) was a Messenian king.

== Family ==
Aphareus was the son of Gorgophone and Perieres and brother of Leucippus. He was the husband and half-brother of Arene, daughter of Oebalus and Gorgophone, and by her fathered Lynceus, Idas and Peisus, though some report that Idas's actual father was Poseidon while Pisus was identified as the son of his father Perieres and thus his brother according to another author. Some called Aphareus's wife to be Polydora or Laocoosa. The patronymic Apharetidae, derived from the name of Aphareus, is sometimes used to refer to Idas and Lynceus collectively.

== Mythology ==
It is said that Aphareus together with his brother Leucippus inherited their father's kingdom upon his death, but the former kept the greater authority than the latter. Aphareus was credited with founding the city Arene in Messenia, which was named after his wife.

When Hippocoon usurped the throne of Sparta, Tyndareus fled to his step-brother Aphareus in Messenia where he settled in Thalamae and while living there, children were born to him.

Aphareus received into his house his cousin Neleus, who had been driven out of Iolcus by Pelias, and assigned to him a tract of land in the maritime part of Messenia, where the main city was Pylos. In the same fashion, Aphareus also welcomed in Arene the exiled Lycus, son of Pandion who fled from his brother Aegeus in Athens. Lycus then revealed the rites of Demeter to Aphareus and his family.

After the death of his sons, Idas and Lynceus with their fight against the Dioscuri, the Messenian kingdom was bereft of male descendants and thus, Nestor, son of Neleus obtained the whole land including all the part ruled formerly by Idas, but not that subject (Tricca) to the sons of Asclepius, Machaon and Podalirius.
