= Athenian Treasury =

Building in Delphi, Greece

Coordinates: 38.4818°N 22.5014°E

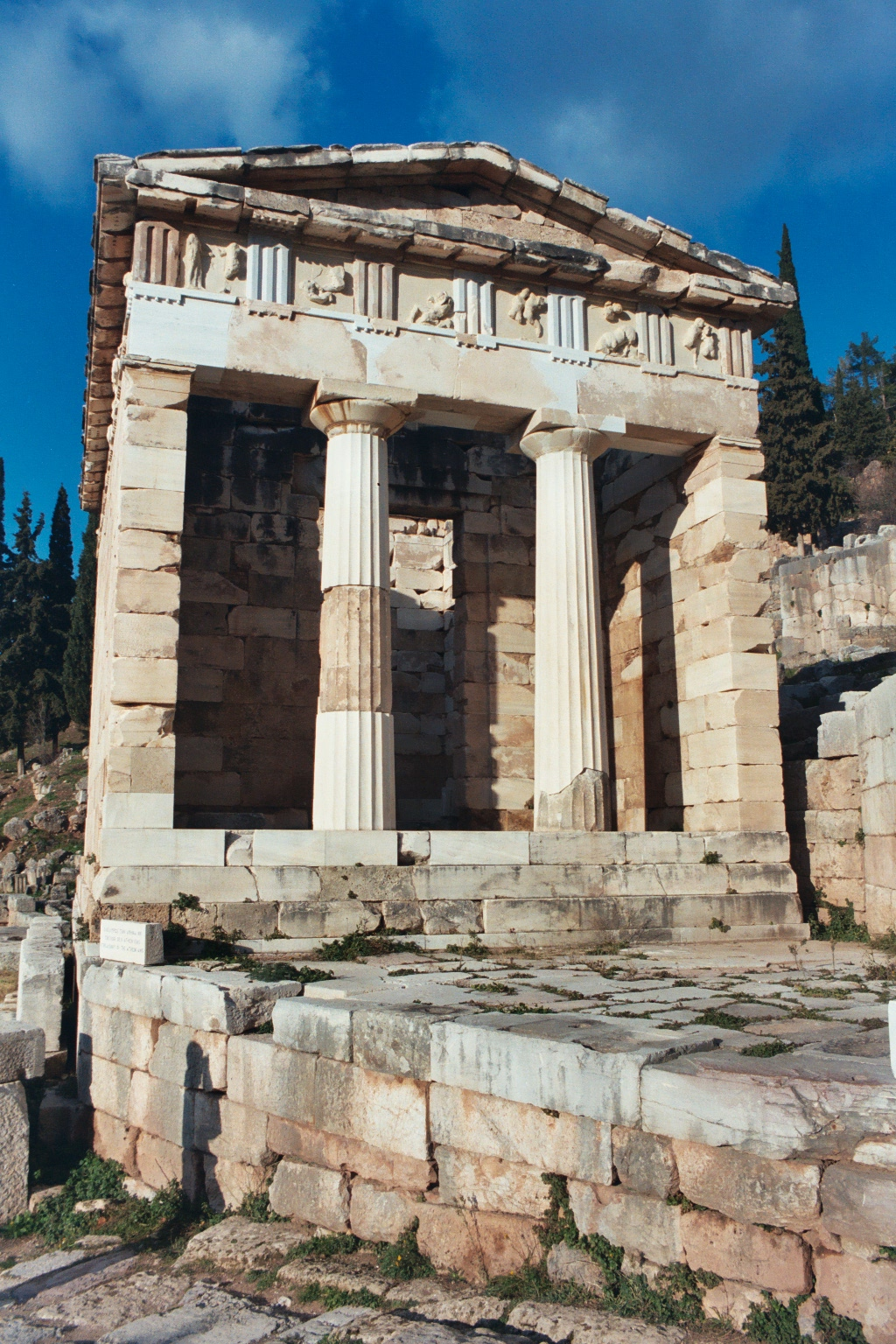
- Interactive map of the Athenian Treasury area

General information
- Type: Treasury
- Architectural style: Doric
- Location: Delphi, Greece
- Construction started: 507 BCE to post-470 BCE
- Completed: 502 BCE to post-470 BCE
- Owner: Delphi Archaeological Museum

Height
- Height: 9.75 metres (32.0 ft)

Dimensions
- Diameter: 6.68 metres (21.9 ft)

Technical details
- Structural system: Parian marble columns

The Athenian Treasury (Greek: Θησαυρός των Αθηναίων) at Delphi was constructed by the Athenians to house dedications and votive offerings made by their city and citizens to the sanctuary of Apollo. The entire treasury, including its sculptural decoration, is built of Parian marble. The date of construction is disputed, and scholarly opinions range from 510 to 480 BCE. It is located directly below the Temple of Apollo along the Sacred Way for all visitors to view the Athenian treasury on the way up to the sanctuary.

Pausanias mentions the building in his account of the sanctuary, claiming that it was dedicated from the spoils of the Battle of Marathon, fought in 490 BCE against the Persians. The Battle of Marathon can be seen in some of the images of the metopes, which compare their victory to mythology. By using the founder of Athens, Theseus, to show the victories of Athens, the treasury established Athens as one of the most powerful polis (city-states) of Greece. The Athenian treasury metopes display the earliest known presence of Theseus in a large-scale sculpture. Before this treasury, Theseus had been depicted on vase paintings, but no architectural depictions have been found. Although Herakles was also depicted in the metopes, the added heroic character showed the Athenians' increasing devotion to Theseus. The pairing of the two heroes was a metaphor alluding to the Battle of Marathon. The metopes show Athenian identity and how they viewed their enemies both foreign or domestic.

The Athenian treasury was the first at a Panhellenic sanctuary that was dedicated by Athens. Several other city-states built treasuries at Delphi.

The building was excavated by the French School at Athens, led by Pierre de La Coste-Messelière, and reconstructed from 1903 to 1906. The structure is still visible in situ, although the metopes are reproductions; the originals are in the museum of Delphi.

== Mythology and the metopes ==
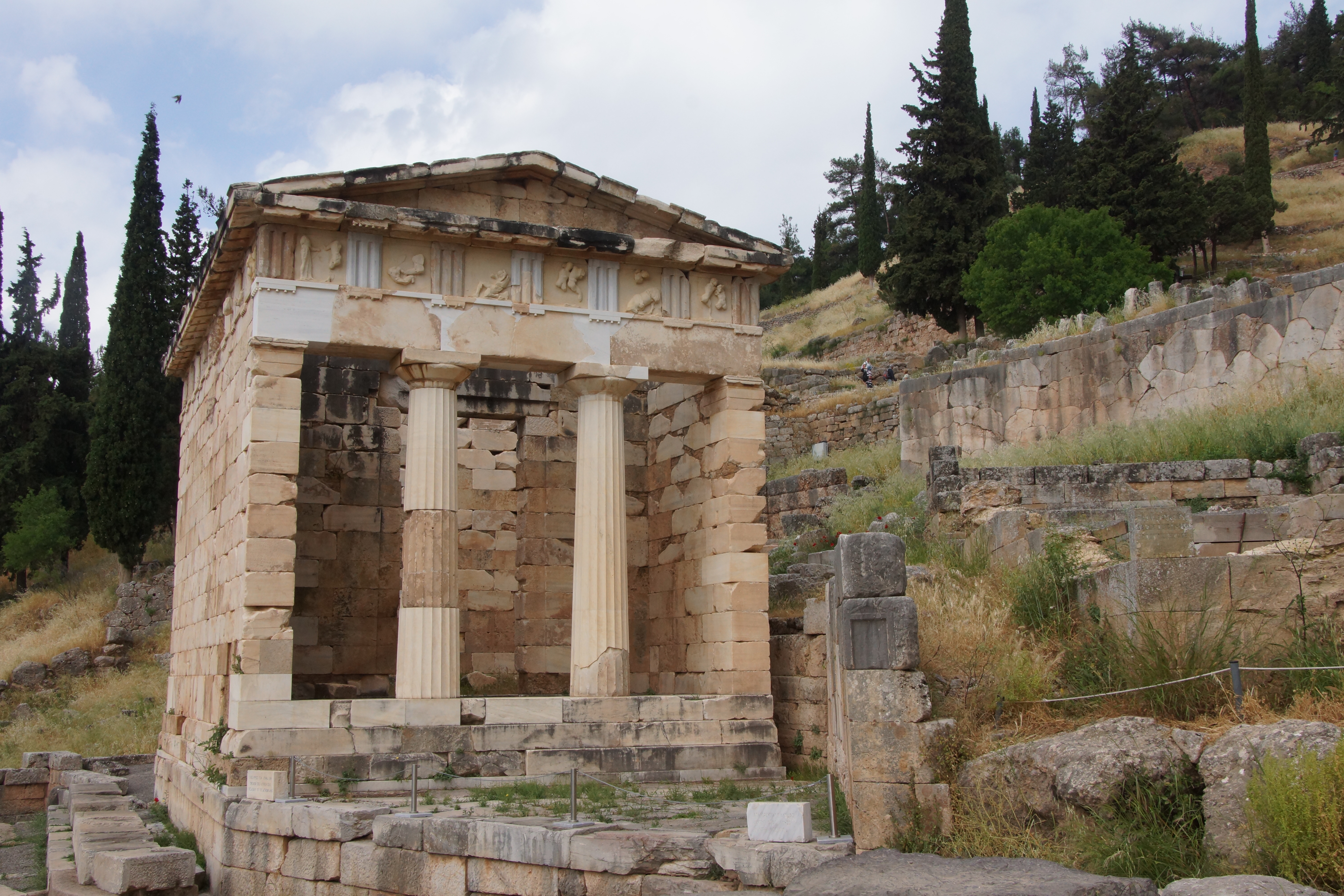
Metopes and triglyphs in the frieze

The main characters of the metopes are from common Athenian mythology, showing these heroes undergoing their many trials. The metopes show Theseus, the mythological founder and king of Athens. His mother, though human, was possessed by Poseidon at the time of conception. The labors of Theseus began in order to claim the throne as he traveled through the six entrances to the underworld. Each labor is depicted in the form of a metope, his strength metaphorically showing Athenian prowess on the international stage that was Greece at the time.

Herakles at the time was the second most mentioned and decorated hero to appear in Athens. Athens wanted to be seen as related not just to their own personal hero Theseus but to connect him to Herakles as a relation to the gods. Each metope contains a single deed done by each hero as they tried to reach their goal. This put the polis-hero on equal level to Herakles; a later version of Theseus that occurred after 460 BCE even had Theseus using his club against the malefactor Periphetes, making him look similar to Herakles. The metopes also draw parallels between the two heroes with the bull which Herakles captured as his seventh labor from Crete and which later Theseus captures and sacrifices to Apollo and Athena.

== Metopes ==
The thirty metopes of the treasury are 67 cm tall and 62–64 cm wide, nine along the long sides (north and south) and six along the short (east and west), depicting the labors of Theseus and Herakles. This is the earliest surviving juxtaposition of the two. Many of these metopes were found scattered around the surrounding area, and the order to which they would have appeared is disputed.

Thesean metopes include:

- Theseus and Athena
- Theseus and Sinis
- Theseus and the Crommyonian sow
- Theseus and Sciron
- Theseus and Cercyon
- Theseus and Procrustes
- Theseus and the Bull of Marathon
- Theseus and the Minotaur
- Theseus and the Captive Amazon

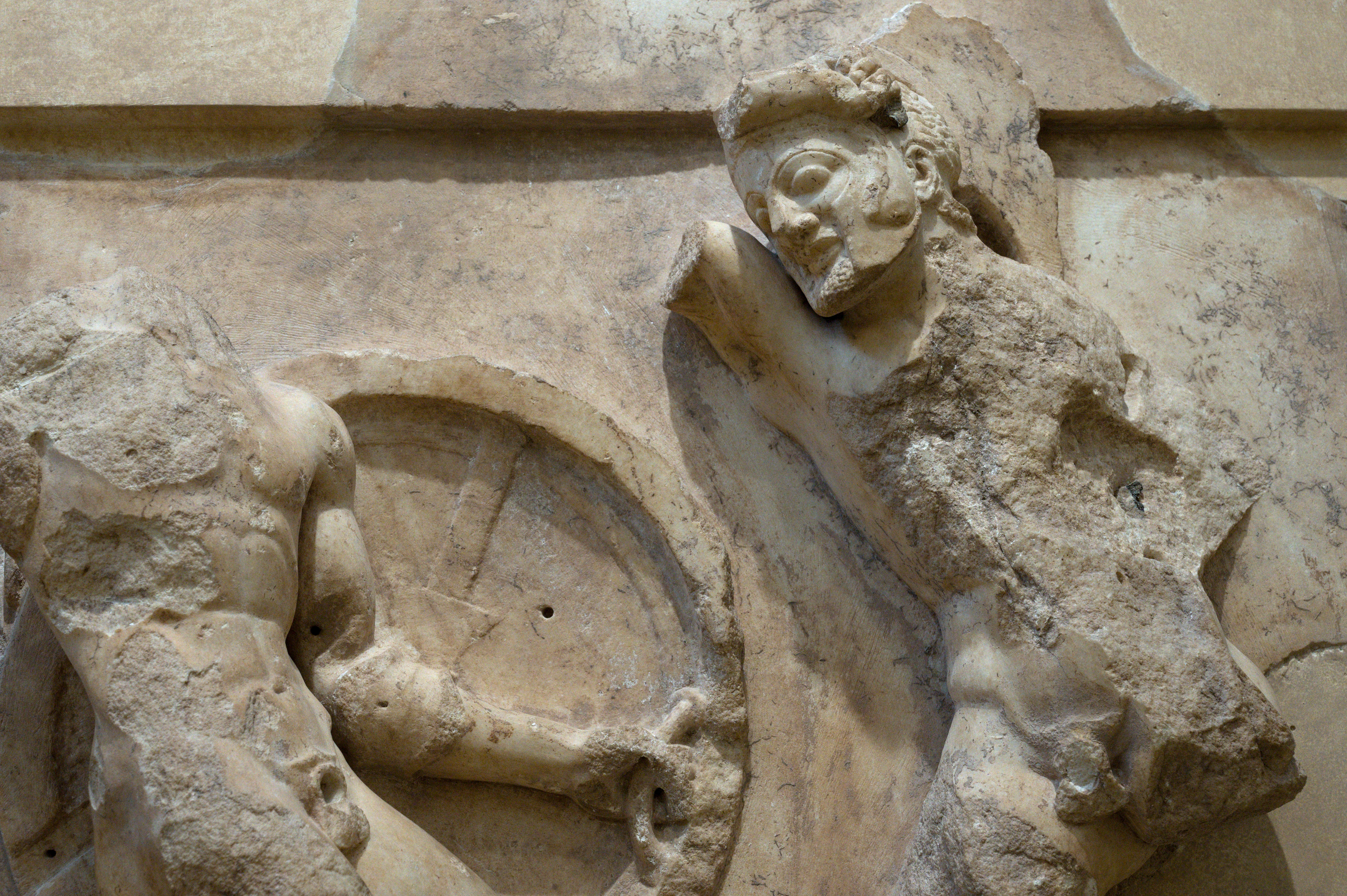
Heracles and Kyknos

Heraklean metopes include:

- Heracles and the Nemean Lion
- Heracles and the Ceryneian Hind
- Heracles and the Centaur
- Heracles and Cycnus
- Heracles and Orthrus
- Geryon
- Cows of Geryon (three metopes)

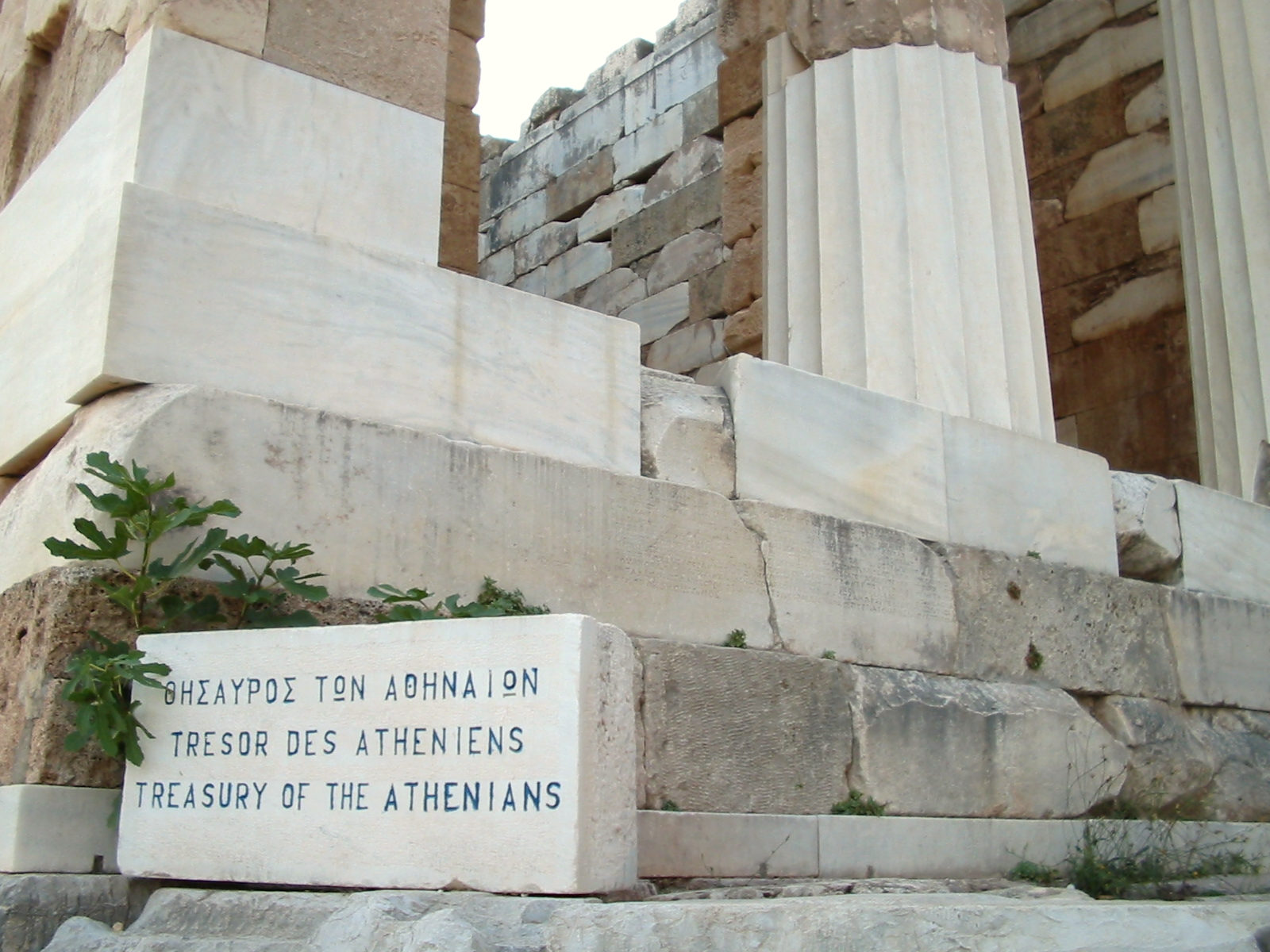
Inscription

== Inscription ==
The platform upon which the treasury stands has a prominent inscription on its south face; it is dated internally to post-490 BCE.

ΑΘΕΝΑΙΟΙ Τ[Ο]Ι ΑΠΟΛΛΟΝ[Ι ΑΠΟ ΜΕΔ]ΟΝ ΑΚ[ΡΟΘ]ΙΝΙΑ ΤΕΣ ΜΑΡΑΘ[Ο]ΝΙ Μ[ΑΧΕ]Σ.

The Athenians dedicated this to Apollo as first fruits from the Persians at the Battle of Marathon.

== Construction ==
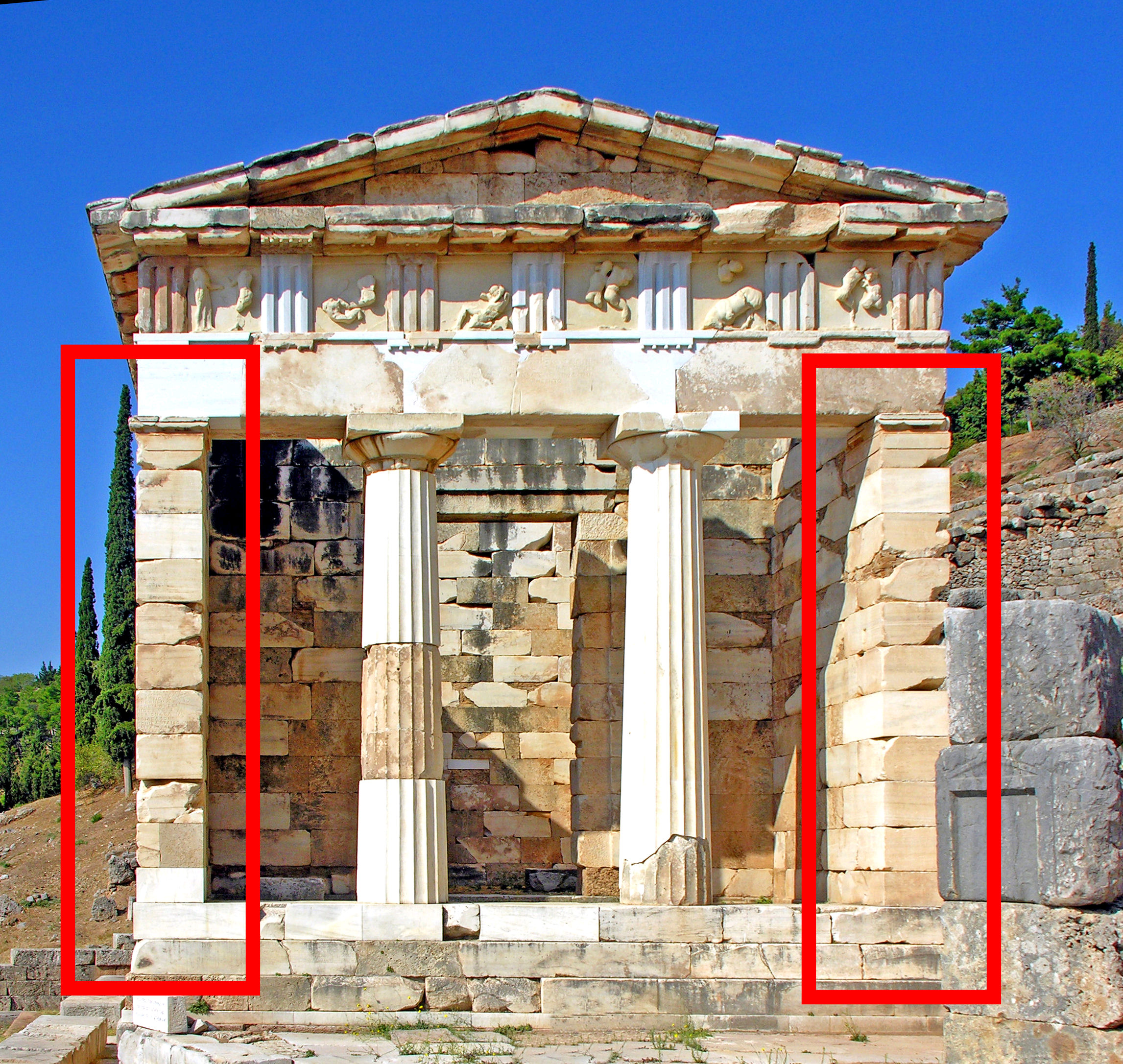
The Athenian Treasury with two antae framing two columns

The Athenian Treasury in Delphi was built according to a typical distyle in antis design, with two antae framing two columns.

The ancient writer and traveler Pausanias was “emphatic that the Athenian Treasury was built [meaning financed] from the spoils from the landing of the Persian general Datis at Marathon”. This means that a date later than 490 BCE, after the Battle of Marathon and accounting for time of construction would be acceptable to Pausanias.

Despite being a primary source, Pausanias on occasion may have been misguided or misinformed, and classical scholars still debate the date of construction. John Boardman notes that “on a purely archaeological, architectural and stylistic grounds the Treasury has appeared to many scholars to date around 500 BCE, and some would put it earlier.”

Recent findings compiled by University of Chicago professor Richard T. Neer, referencing excavations from 1989 (summarized by Pierre Amandry in 1998), advocates for the latter date:

A ledge of 0.30 meters in width projects from the Treasury’s stereobate along its south side only, and that this ledge helps to support the Marathon base. In other words, the plan of the Treasury takes the base into account from the earliest phase of construction. The two structures are thus integral, and both must date after the battle of Marathon in 490 BCE. With this archaeological datum, the chronology of the Athenian treasury must be considered settled. Pausanias was correct.

It has been suggested to have an earlier construction date due to the late Archaic style used for the architecture. The Doric style was modeled after the use of wood to create structures. The paintings inside the treasury were dated back to the 480's BCE, making specialists believe construction started before the military victory.

== Votive offerings ==
The treasury was made to contain votive offerings such as spoils of war and kouros. This is where the famous twin kouros statues, Kleobis and Biton, were found. They were originally made at the Temple of Athena in Argos, but were given to the Athenian Treasury as a mark of respect. Because Athens was a superpower at the time, many city-states paid it for protection. The treasury was not only an offering to the gods, but a statement of their power, showing off arms, statuettes, and other pottery. The treasury was also a statement about the wealth of their new government. After transitioning from a tyrannically ruled city-state into a democracy, the Athenians sought to internationally display their increased military success, wealth, and prosperity.

Votive offerings were often given after a great win, a prayer, or a funeral piece. These offerings were given by all Greeks to the gods in a sign of worship. Having a separate treasury allowed Athenians to show more of their prominent victories and achievements, establishing their identity as a people and also to show the rest of Greece that they were elites in the hierarchy.

== Role at a Panhellenic sanctuary ==
A Panhellenic sanctuary was open to all of the city-states. The Athenians took this chance to display their civic pride and prosperity to not only the other city-states but to the gods and show them that they deserved their favor.

This treasury held and displayed the votive offerings dedicated to the god Apollo at Delphi. The amount of dedications given would determine the power, range, and existence of the god. The treasury would house and protect the most durable offerings and also precious offerings that could withstand time. The Athenian Treasury is one of the more elaborate treasuries, showing the prosperity of Athens. The dedications belonged to Apollo and were not allowed to leave the sanctuary. The offerings stay within the temenos but were buried in votive pits once they were found to no longer be practical to display. The offerings would become more elaborate as the status of the Athenians increased, especially after winning a war in which they thought Apollo had shown them favor.

== The site of Delphi ==
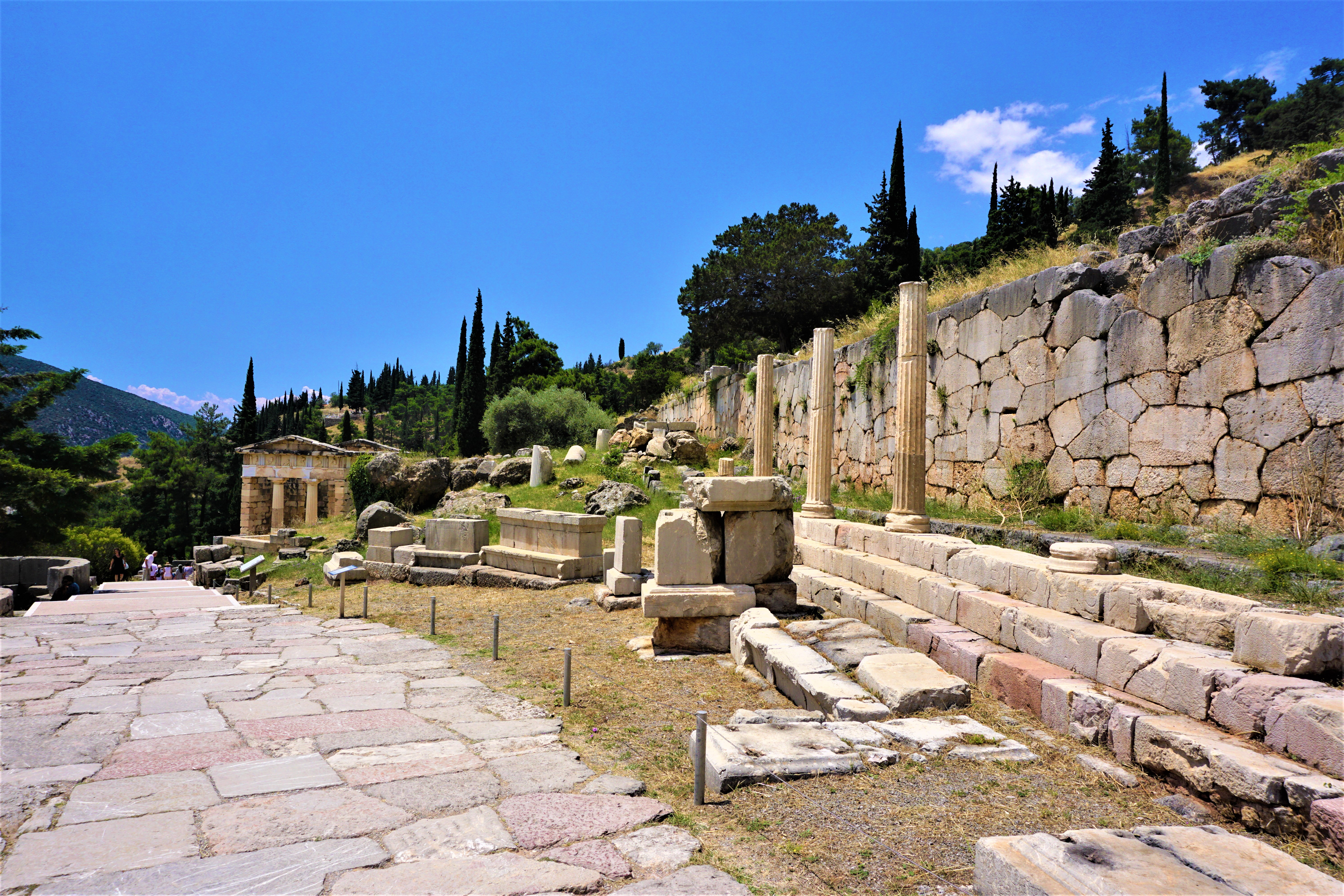
The site of Delphi

The Athenians, Siphnians, and the Sikyonians each had their own treasury lining the pathway to the Temple of Apollo, at the site of Delphi. The geographical location of the Temple of Apollo was significant in Greek mythology as it was the destination where two eagles, placed at opposite ends of the earth by Zeus, met.

This temple was considered an oracle, where Apollo could communicate to humans through the Pythia. The Greeks, their leaders, and other foreign leaders journeyed to the temple of Apollo seeking advice from the Pythia, despite misinterpretations often leading to twists in fate.

Much like the Olympics today, the site of Delphi hosted the Pythian Games as a dedication to Apollo, in the site's Greek theater. As well as athletic competitions, the Pythian Games also held poetry, dance, and music contests, drawing in spectators and crowds. The presence of the oracle and the Pythian Games allowed the Athenians to showcase their treasury on an international scale.

== See also ==
- Siphnian Treasury
