= Periphetes (son of Hephaestus) =

Bandit in Greek mythology

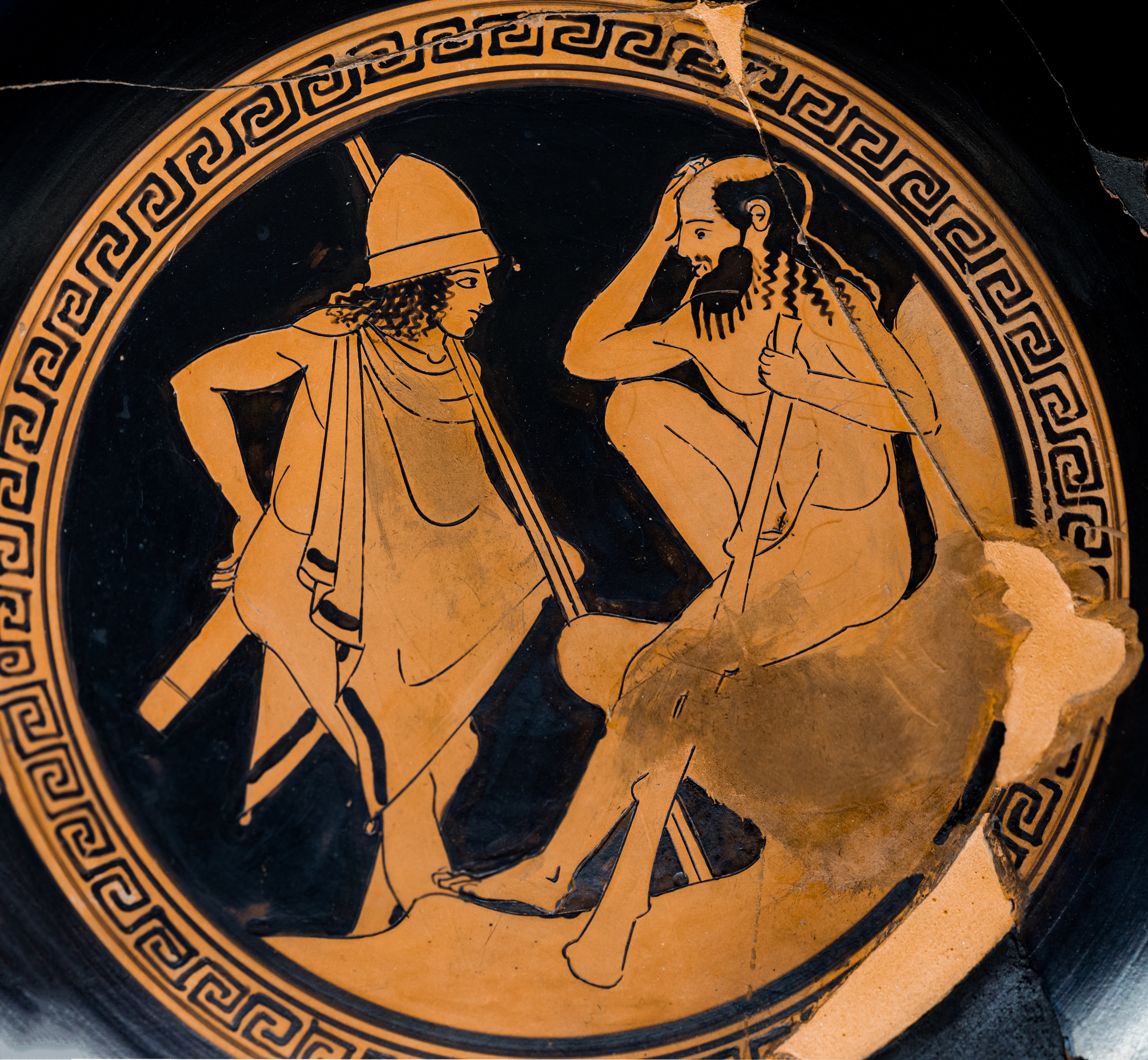
Theseus and Periphetes on a fifth-century BC Attic red-figure kylix, National Archaeological Museum of Florence.

In Greek mythology, Periphetes (Ancient Greek: Περιφήτης, romanized: Periphḗtēs), also called Corynetes (Ancient Greek: Κορυνήτης, romanized: Korunḗtēs, lit. 'club-carrier'), is one of the several bandits encountered and defeated by the hero Theseus on his way to Athens. Periphetes would roam the roads and attack and rob travellers before killing them with his club.

== Family ==
Periphetes was the son of Hephaestus and a woman called Anticlea. Gaius Julius Hyginus refers to him as 'son of Neptune' (Roman Poseidon), but elsewhere includes him among the sons of Vulcan (Hephaestus).

== Mythology ==
Periphetes dwelt in the region around Epidaurus, and would attack and kill passers-by with his large bronze club, earning the nickname 'Clubman' (Ancient Greek: Κορυνήτης, from the noun κορύνη, "club"). In one version he had a leg deformity like his father Hephaestus, forcing him to use an iron club with which he dispatched travellers.

Finally, Theseus had to traverse the area on his way from his hometown Troezen to Athens and ran into the bandit, the first of deadly foes he encountered after leaving Troezen. Periphetes tried to attack him but the hero wrestled him and slew him. He then took the dead Periphetes' club to use from now on, as Heracles had done with the skin of the Nemean lion.

== Iconography ==
Unlike the other exploits of Theseus, Periphetes is rare in ancient Greek iconography, especially Attic vases. Cyclical depictions of the labours of Theseus usually omit Periphetes while including the Minotaur and other animal fights. A small number of ancient vases have been speculated to be depictions of Periphetes, but they could as well show another labour of Theseus or different hero altogether.

Theseus' struggle against Periphetes is included in the metopes of the Athenian Treasury at Delphi, which has been described as 'astonishing' due to Periphetes' absence in other Theseus-related artwork. Perhaps the story of Periphetes and the club was used by the Athenians to draw a parallel between their hero and Heracles, who also used a club. Periphetes has also been identified as a figure from the Theseus metopes of the Temple of Hephaestus in Athens, though the exact identification of those metopes is much-debated. Traditionally, Periphetes was seen as the figure on the first (from the east) metope on the north side of the temple, but a different view holds that he is on the first (from the west) southern metope (otherwise associated with Procrustes). While either metope could be Periphetes, Charles H. Morgan wrote that only the southwestern could be Procrustes. As with the other enemies of Theseus, Periphetes has an exaggerated big, ogre-like head.

== See also ==
Other criminals killed by Theseus include:

- Sinis
- Sciron
- Crommyonian Sow

== Bibliography ==
- Apollodorus, The Library, with an English Translation by Sir James George Frazer, F.B.A., F.R.S. in 2 Volumes. Cambridge, MA, Harvard University Press; London, William Heinemann Ltd. 1921. Online version at the Perseus Digital Library.
- Diodorus Siculus, Library of History, Volume III: Books 4.59-8, translated by C. H. Oldfather, Loeb Classical Library No. 340. Cambridge, Massachusetts, Harvard University Press, 1939. ISBN 978-0-674-99375-4. Online version at Harvard University Press. Online version by Bill Thayer.
- Hoff, Ralf von den (2009). "Herakles, Theseus and the Athenian Treasury at Delphi". In Hoff, Ralf von den; Schulz, Peter (eds.). Structure, Image, Ornament: Architectural Sculpture of the Greek World. Oxford: Oxbow Books. doi:10.11588/propylaeumdok.00002159.
- Hyginus, Gaius Julius, The Myths of Hyginus, edited and translated by Mary A. Grant, Lawrence: University of Kansas Press, 1960. Available on Topos Text.
- Morgan, Charles H. (1962). "The Sculptures of the Hephaisteion: I." Hesperia: The Journal of the American School of Classical Studies at Athens. 31 (2).
- Neils, Jennifer (1994). "Theseus". Lexicon Iconographicum Mythologiae Classicae (LIMC). Vol. VII.1: Oidipous – Theseus. Zürich and Munich: Artemis Verlag. ISBN 3-7608-8751-1. Available online on the Internet Archive.
- Ovid, Metamorphoses with an English translation by Arthur Golding. London, W. Seres. 1567. Available online at Perseus Digital Library.
- Pausanias, Description of Greece with an English Translation by W.H.S. Jones, Litt.D., and H.A. Ormerod, M.A., in 4 Volumes. Cambridge, MA, Harvard University Press; London, William Heinemann Ltd. 1918. Online version at the Perseus Digital Library.
- Plutarch, Life of Theseus in Plutarch's Parallel Lives, with an English Translation by Bernadotte Perrin. Cambridge, MA. Harvard University Press. London. William Heinemann Ltd. 1914. 1. Available online at Perseus Digital Library.
- Sudas, Suda, translated and edited by several authors, including David Whitehead. Suda on Line.
