= Anta (architecture) =

Posts or pillars flanking a doorway

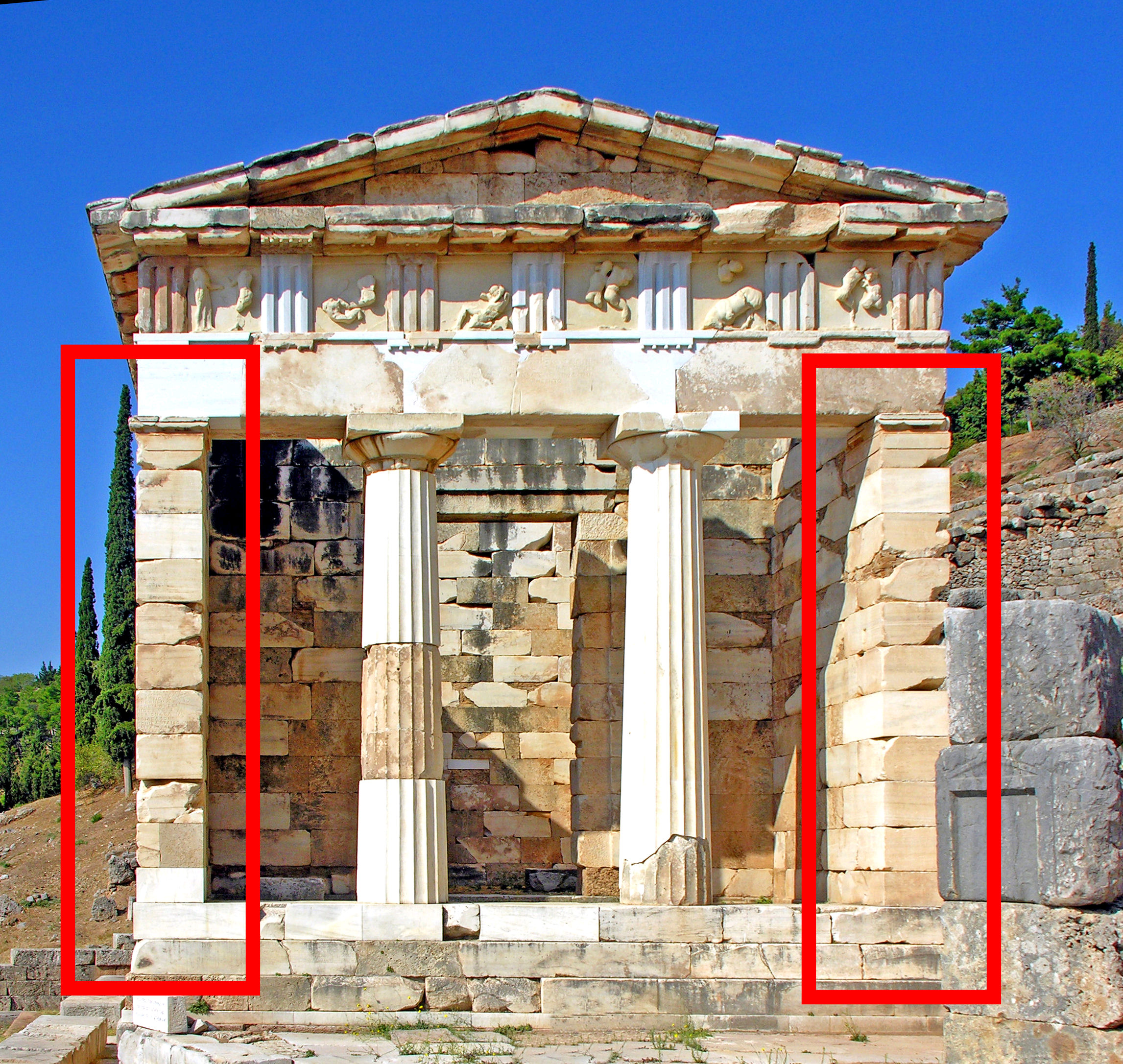
The Athenian Treasury in Delphi with two antae framing a set of two columns

An anta (pl. antæ, antae, or antas; Latin, possibly from ante, "before" or "in front of"), or sometimes parastas (pl. parastades), is a term in classical architecture describing the posts or pillars on either side of a doorway or entrance of a Greek temple – the slightly projecting piers which terminate the side walls (of the naos). Antae are formed either by thickening the walls or by attaching a separate strip and can serve to reinforce brick walls, as in the Heraeum of Olympia (c. 600 BCE).

Antae differ from the pilaster, which is purely decorative, and does not have the structural support function of the anta.

== Anta ==
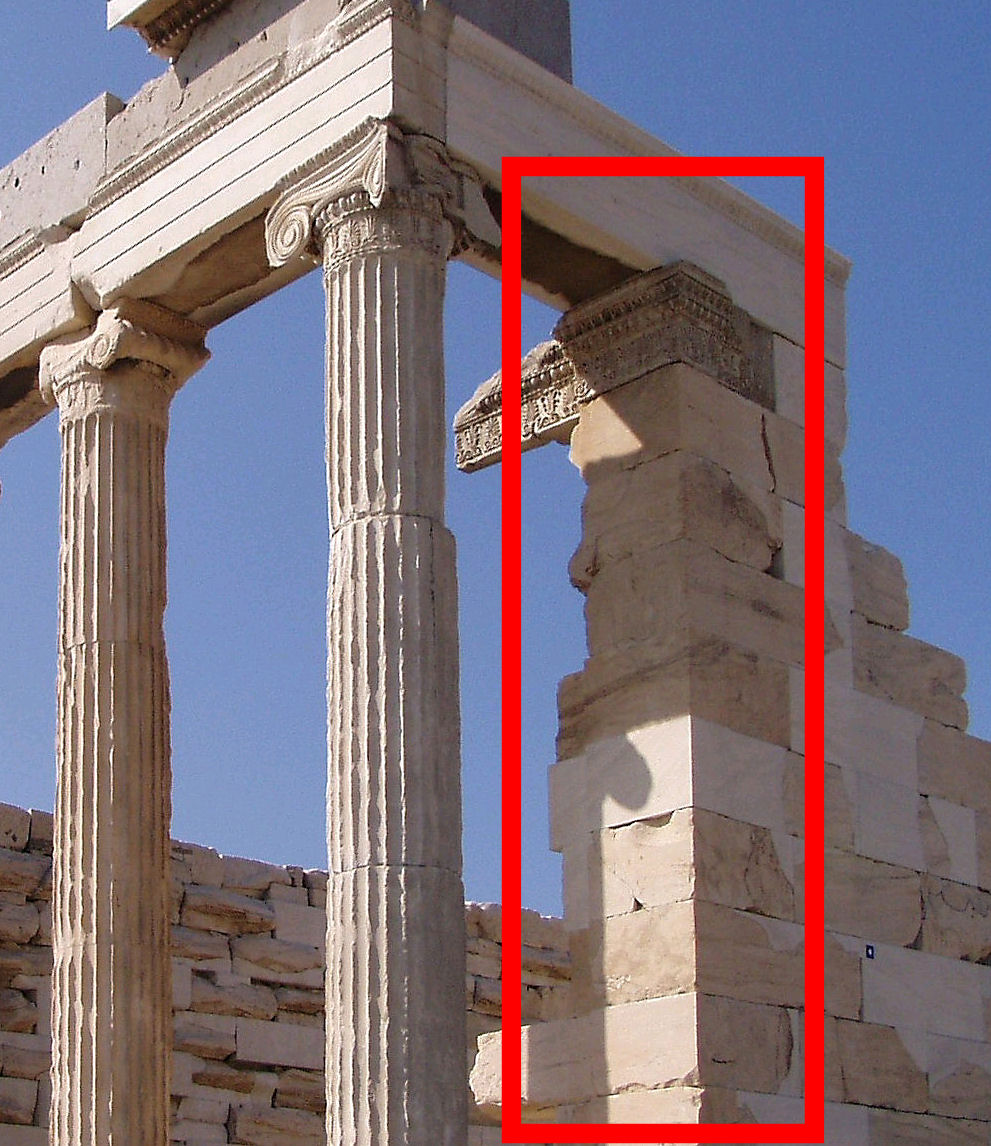
An anta behind a row of columns at the Erectheion, a prostyle temple, Athens (built between 421 and 406 BCE). A decorative capital can be seen at the top.

In contrast to columns or pillars, antae are directly connected with the walls of a temple. They owe their origin to the vertical posts of timber employed in the early, more primitive palaces or temples of Greece, as at Tiryns and in the Temple of Hera at Olympia. They were used as load-bearing structures to carry the roof timbers, as no reliance could be placed on walls built with unburnt brick or in rubble masonry with clay mortar. Later, they became more decorative as the materials used for wall construction became sufficient to support the structure.

When there are columns between antae, as in a porch facade, rather than a solid wall, the columns are said to be in antis.

== Anta capitals ==
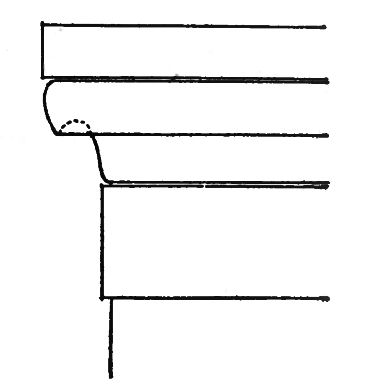
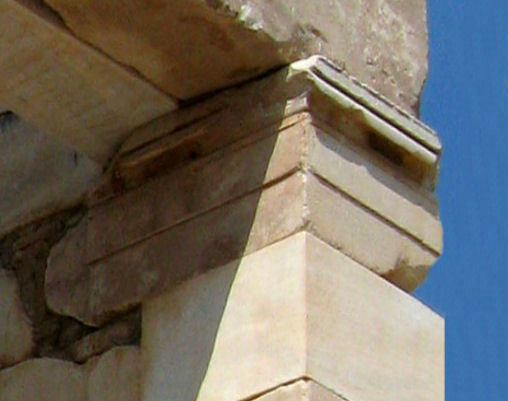
Left image: Characteristic shape of the Doric anta capital.
Right image: Doric anta capital at the Athenian Treasury (circa 500 BCE).

The anta is generally crowned by a stone block designed to spread the load from superstructure (entablature) it supports, called an "anta capital" when it is structural, or sometimes "pilaster capital" if it is only decorative as often during the Roman period. In order not to protrude unduly from the wall, these anta capitals usually display a rather flat surface, so that the capital has more or less a brick-shaped structure overall. The anta capital can be more or less decorated depending on the artistic order it belongs to, with designs, at least in ancient Greek architecture, often quite different from the design of the column capitals it stands next to. This difference disappeared with Roman times, when anta or pilaster capitals have design very similar to those of the column capitals.

== Distyle in antis ==
Early Greek temples, the "distyle temples", such as the 6th century BCE Siphnian Treasury had antae on both side of the porch, framing a set of columns (a disposition named "distyle in antis", meaning "two columns in between antae"). "Antae temple" is an alternative term.

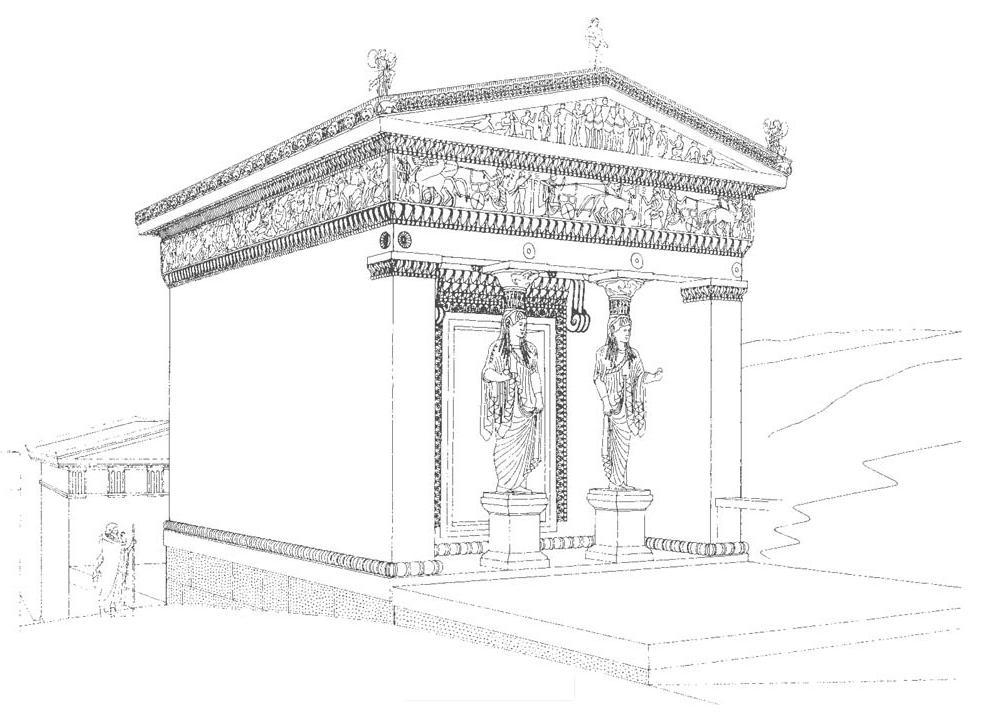
Early Greek temples such as the Siphnian Treasury had antae on both side of the porch, framing a set of columns.

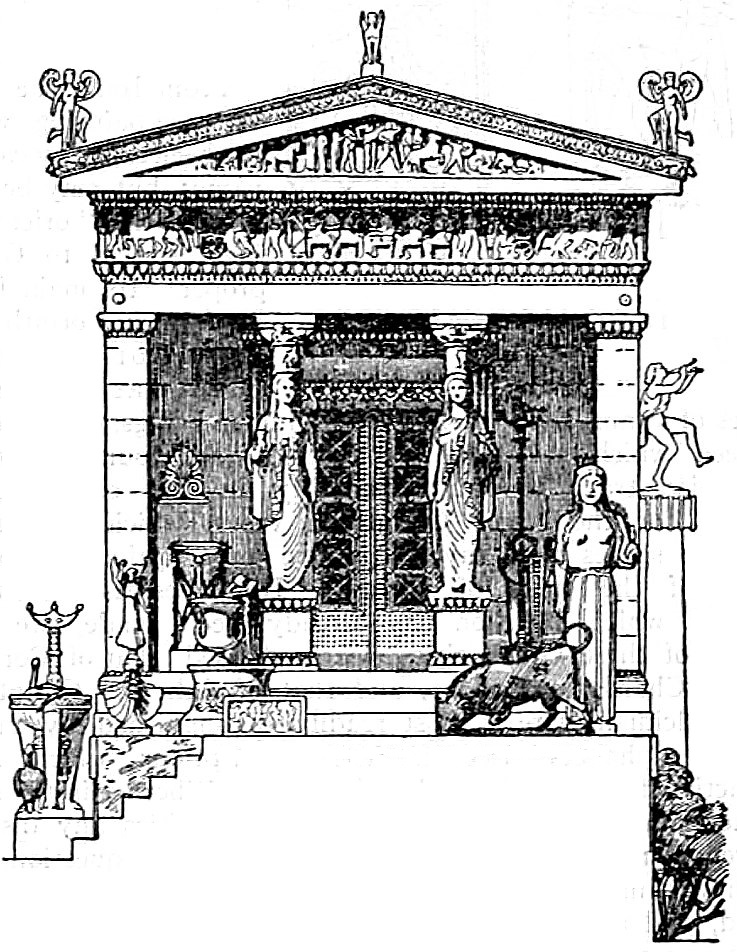
Front view of the Siphnian Treasury with framing antae

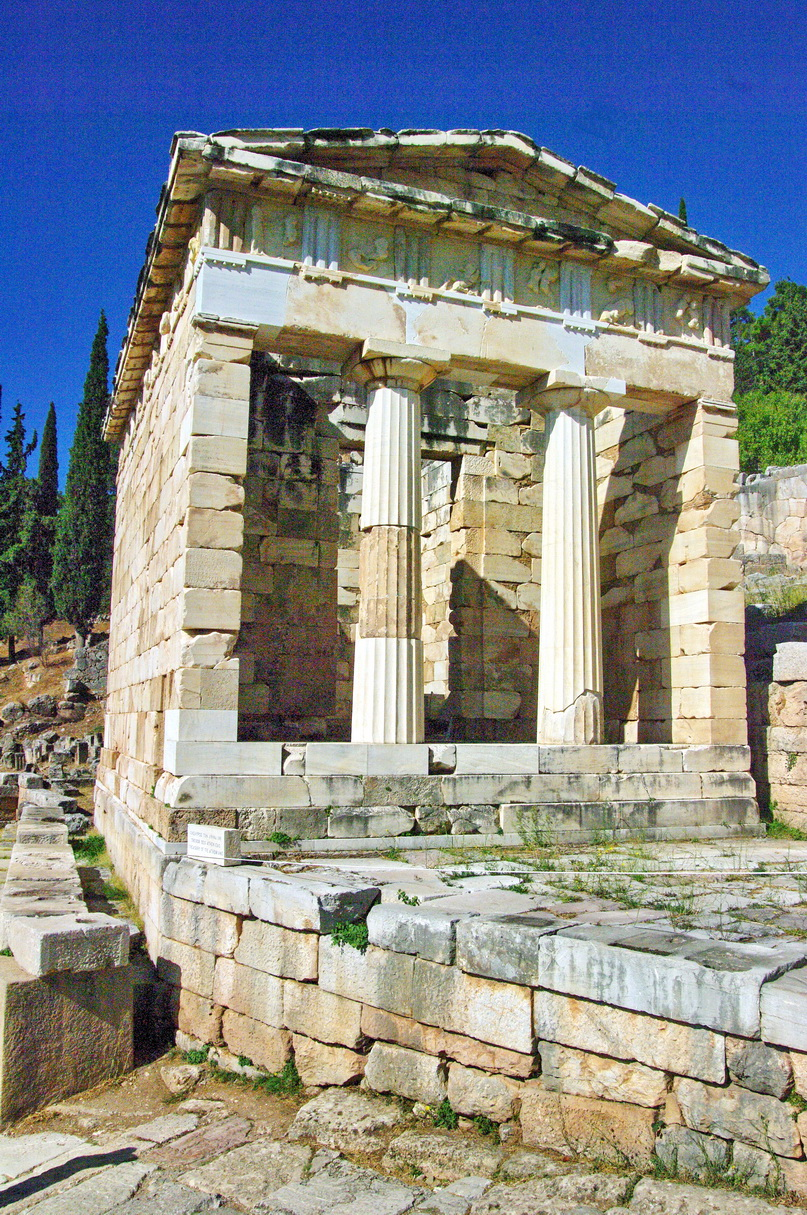
The Athenian Treasury in Delphi is also a distyle in antis design.

== See also ==
- Distyle
