= Theseia =

Ancient Greek festival of Theseus

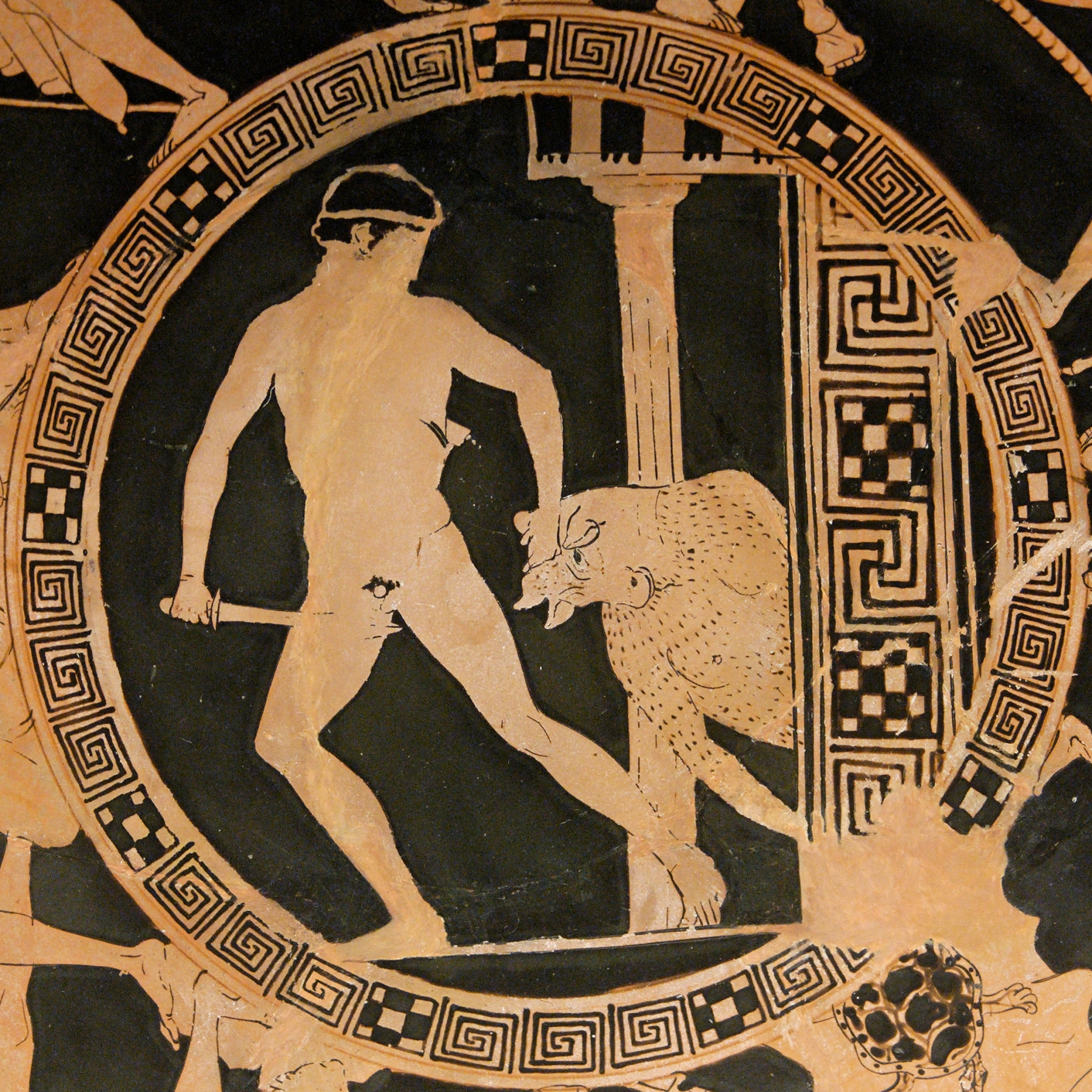
Theseus dragging the Minotaur from the Labyrinth.

The Theseia (Ancient Greek: Θησεῖα, Thēseĩa) was an ancient Greek festival held in Athens in the honor of Theseus. This festival was first implemented in the 470s BCE, after an Athenian general known as Cimon son of Miltiades attacked the island of Skyros in search of the bones of Theseus, after receiving instructions from an oracle of Delphi to go there. Once he defeated the local Dolopians, he scoured the island and found a tomb of a gigantic man that he would proclaim to be the remains of Theseus and would bring them back to Athens for proper burial.

The contests held during Theseia were usually a torch race, athletic events that make a gumnikos agon, and competitions in horsemanship and military displays. The athletic events were conducted by hoplites in their armor and would compete in footraces, displays of their weapon handling skills, and would culminate in equestrian competitions. These first events were only open to Athenian men but were soon followed more multinational events that were open to foreigners. This festival could be considered a euandria or a contest judge men which could mean to judge beauty but in the case of the Theseia its meant more to judge their military character.

== See also ==
- Athenian festivals
