= Crommyon =

Town of ancient Corinthia

Coordinates: 37°55′39″N 23°08′29″E

Crommyon or Krommyon (Ancient Greek: Κρομμυών), or Cromyon or Kromyon (Κρομυών), or Cremmyon or Kremmyon (Κρεμμυών), was a small town of ancient Corinthia on the Saronic Gulf, but originally the last town of Megaris. It was the chief place between the isthmus, properly so called, and Megara; whence the whole of this coast was called the Crommyonia (ἡ Κρομμυωνία). Crommyon was distant 120 stadia from Corinth, and therefore occupied the site of the ruins near the chapel of Ag. Theodori (St. Theodorus). Crommyon is said by Pausanias to have derived its name from Crommus, the son of Poseidon. It is celebrated in mythology as the haunt of the Crommyonian Sow destroyed by Theseus. It was taken by the Lacedaemonians in the Corinthian War, but was recovered by Iphicrates.

== See also ==
- Agioi Theodoroi
