= Theseus =

Legendary king of Athens who slayed the Minotaur

- Founder and Patron of Athens; Slayer of the Minotaur
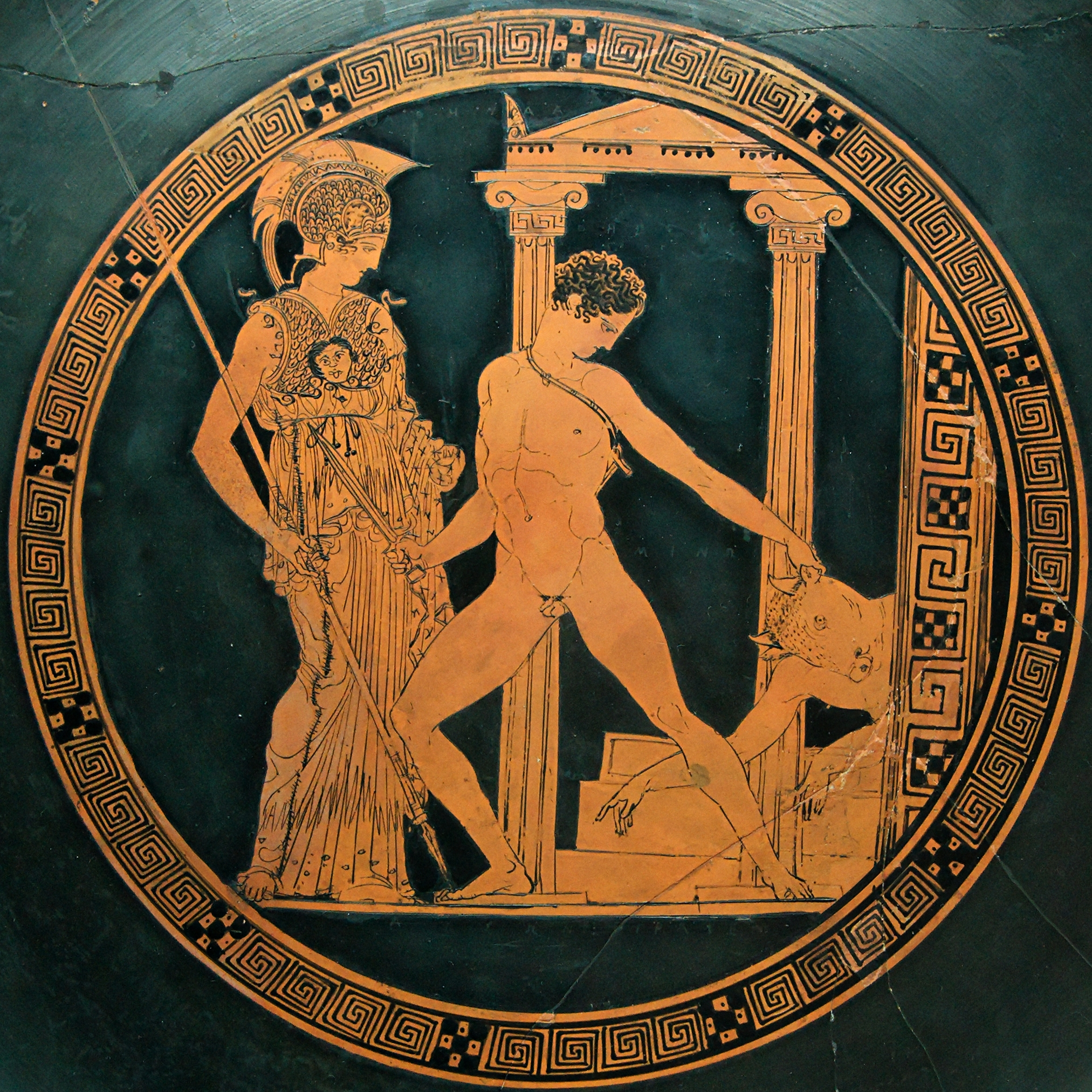
- Theseus slaying the Minotaur, with Athena nearby, tondo of a kylix by Aison, late 5th century BC
- Festivals: Theseia
- Symbols: Sword, Corinthian helmet (occasionally)

Genealogy
- Born: Troezen
- Died: Skyros
- Parents: Aegeus or Poseidon (father); Aethra (mother)
- Consorts: Phaedra, Ariadne, Hippolyta
- Offspring: Demophon, Acamas, Hippolytus

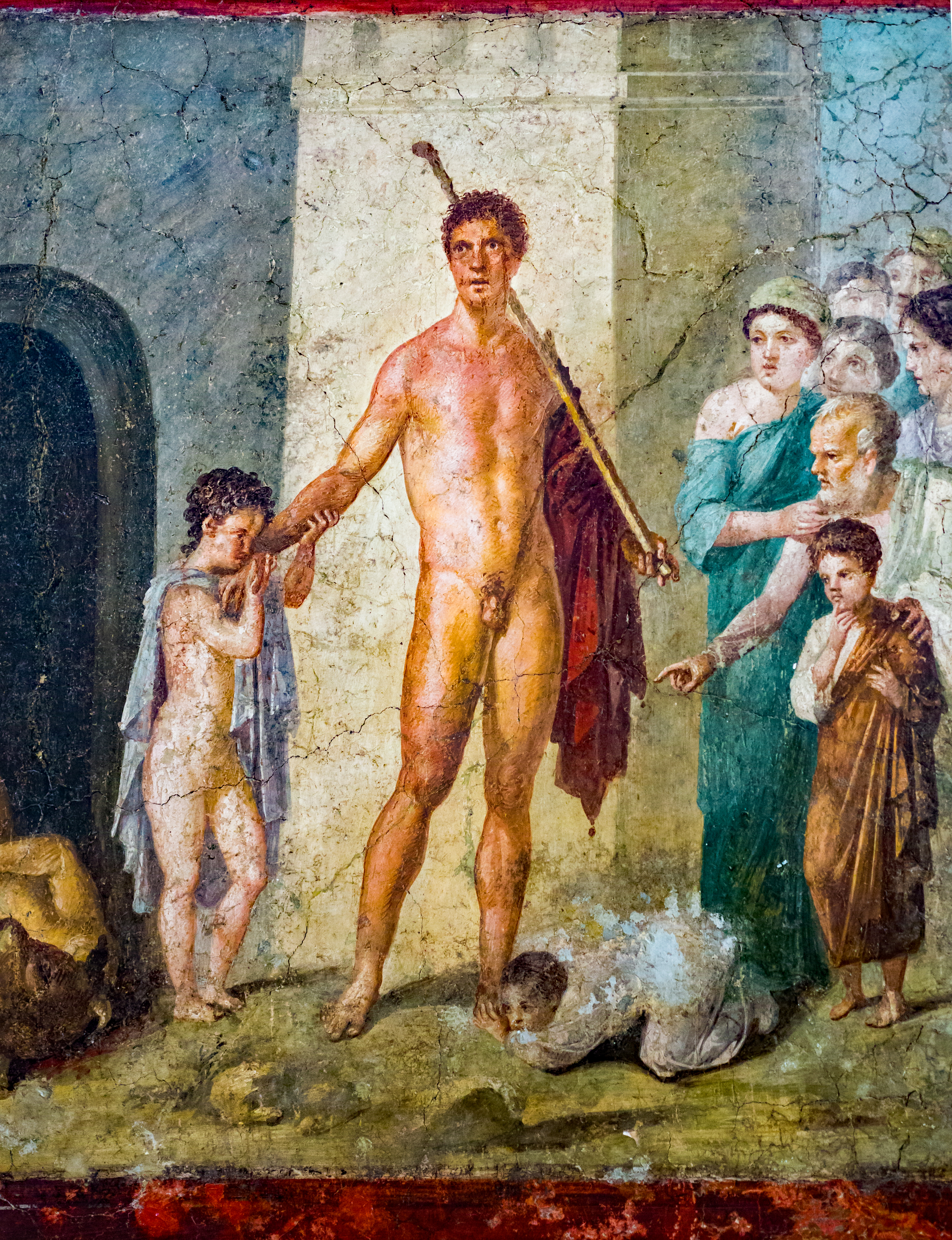
Theseus after having slain the Minotaur, freeing captive Athenian boys; Cretans approaching to marvel the scene, Antique fresco from Pompeii

Theseus (UK: /ˈθiːsjuːs/, US: /ˈθiːsiəs/; Ancient Greek: Θησεύς, romanized: Thēseús, lit. 'the placer', 'the instituter' or 'one who establishes order', [tʰɛːsěu̯s]) was a divine hero in Greek mythology, famous for slaying the Minotaur. The myths surrounding Theseus, his journeys, exploits, and friends, have provided material for storytelling throughout the ages.

Theseus is sometimes described as the son of Aegeus, king of Athens, and sometimes as the son of the god Poseidon. He is raised by his mother, Aethra, and upon discovering his connection to Aegeus he travels overland to Athens, having many adventures on the way. When he reaches Athens he finds that Aegeus is married to Medea (formerly wife of Jason), who plots against him.

The most famous legend about Theseus is his slaying of the Minotaur, half man and half bull. He then goes on to unite Attica under Athenian rule: the synoikismos ('dwelling together'). As the unifying king, he is credited with building a palace on the fortress of the Acropolis. Pausanias reports that after synoikismos, Theseus established a cult of Aphrodite ('Aphrodite of all the People') on the southern slope of the Acropolis.

Plutarch's Life of Theseus makes use of varying accounts of the death of the Minotaur, Theseus's escape, and his romantic involvement with and betrayal of Ariadne, daughter of King Minos. (Note: "May I therefore succeed in purifying Fable, making her submit to reason and take on the semblance of History. But where she obstinately disdains to make herself credible, and refuses to admit any element of probability, I shall pray for kindly readers, and such as receive with indulgence the tales of antiquity." (Plutarch, Life of Theseus, translated by Bernadotte Perrin).)

Plutarch's avowed purpose is to construct a life that parallels the Life of Romulus, the founding myth of Rome. Plutarch's sources, not all of whose texts have survived independently, include Pherecydes (mid-fifth century BC), Demon (c. 400 BC), Philochorus, and Cleidemus (both fourth century BC). As the subject of myth, the existence of Theseus as a real person has not been proven, but scholars believe that he may have been alive during the Late Bronze Age, or possibly as a king in the 8th or 9th century BC.

== Birth and early years ==
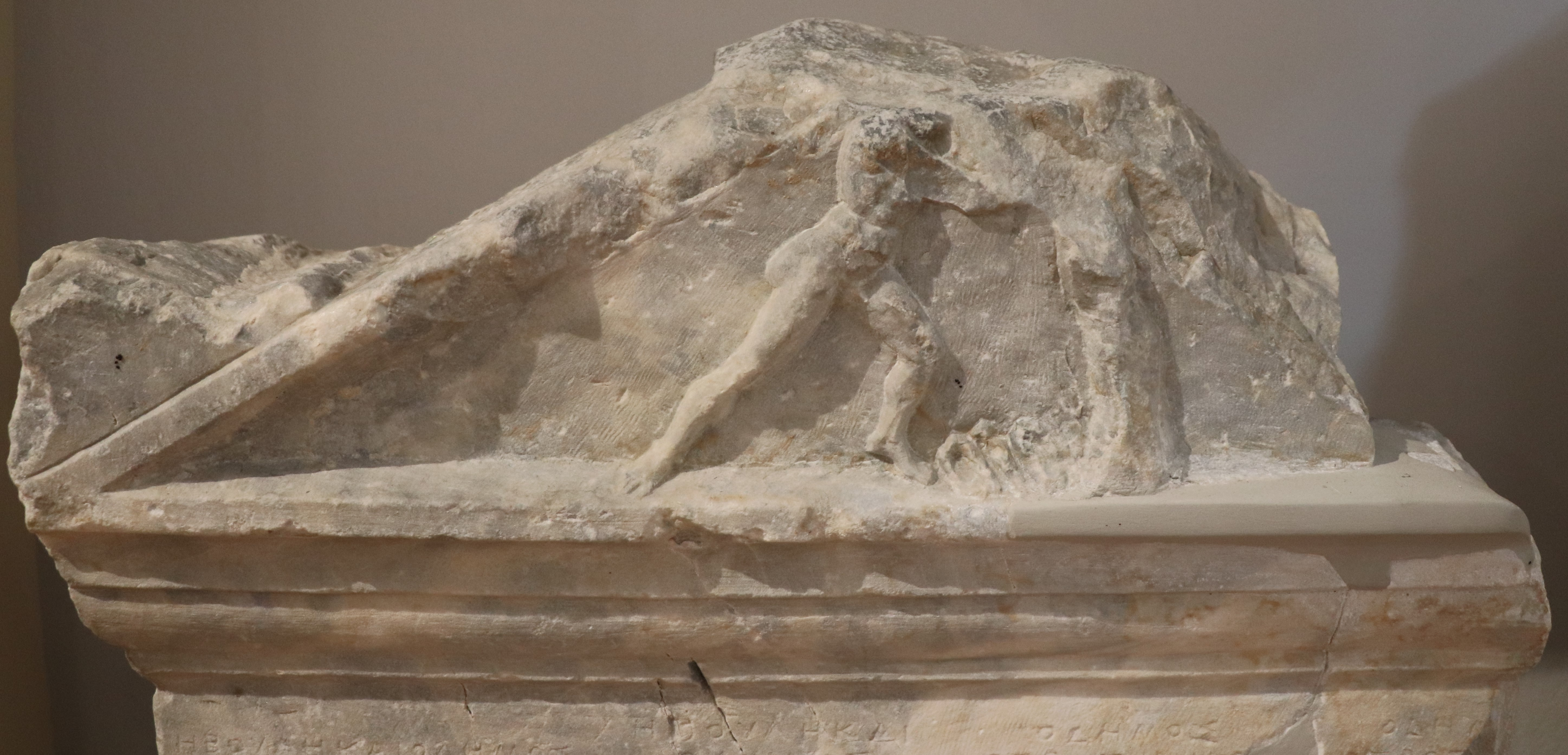
Theseus uncovers Aegeus's sword and sandals, relief sculpture on a decree of 140/39 BC

Aegeus, one of the primordial kings of Athens, was childless. Desiring an heir, he asked the Oracle of Delphi for advice. Her cryptic words were "Do not loosen the bulging mouth of the wineskin until you have reached the height of Athens, lest you die of grief." Aegeus did not understand the prophecy and was disappointed. He asked the advice of his host Pittheus, king of Troezen. Pittheus understood the prophecy, got Aegeus drunk, and gave Aegeus his daughter Aethra.

But following the instructions of Athena in a dream, Aethra left the sleeping Aegeus and waded across to the island of Sphairia that lay close to Troezen's shore. There, she poured a libation to Sphairos (Pelops's charioteer) and Poseidon and was possessed by the sea god in the night. The mix gave Theseus a combination of divine as well as mortal characteristics in his nature; such double paternity, with one immortal and one mortal, was a familiar feature of other Greek heroes. After Aethra became pregnant, Aegeus decided to return to Athens. Before leaving, however, he buried his sandals and sword under a huge rock (Note: Rock "which had a hollow in it just large enough to receive these objects," Plutarch says.) and told Aethra that when their son grew up, he should move the rock, if he were heroic enough, and take the tokens for himself as evidence of his royal parentage. In Athens, Aegeus was joined by Medea, who had left Corinth after slaughtering the children she had borne to Jason, and had taken Aegeus as her new consort.

Thus Theseus was raised in his mother's land. When Theseus grew up to be a young man, he moved the rock and recovered his father's tokens. His mother then told him the truth about his father's identity and that he must take the sword and sandals back to the king Aegeus to claim his birthright. To journey to Athens, Theseus could choose to go by sea (which was the safe way) or by land, following a dangerous path around the Saronic Gulf, where he would encounter a string of six entrances to the Underworld, (Note: Compared to Hercules and his Labours, "Theseus is occupied only with the sacred Entrances that are local to the lands of Athens" (Ruck and Staples 1994:204).) each guarded by a chthonic enemy. Young, brave, and ambitious, Theseus decided to go alone by the land route and defeated many bandits along the way.

== The Six Labours ==
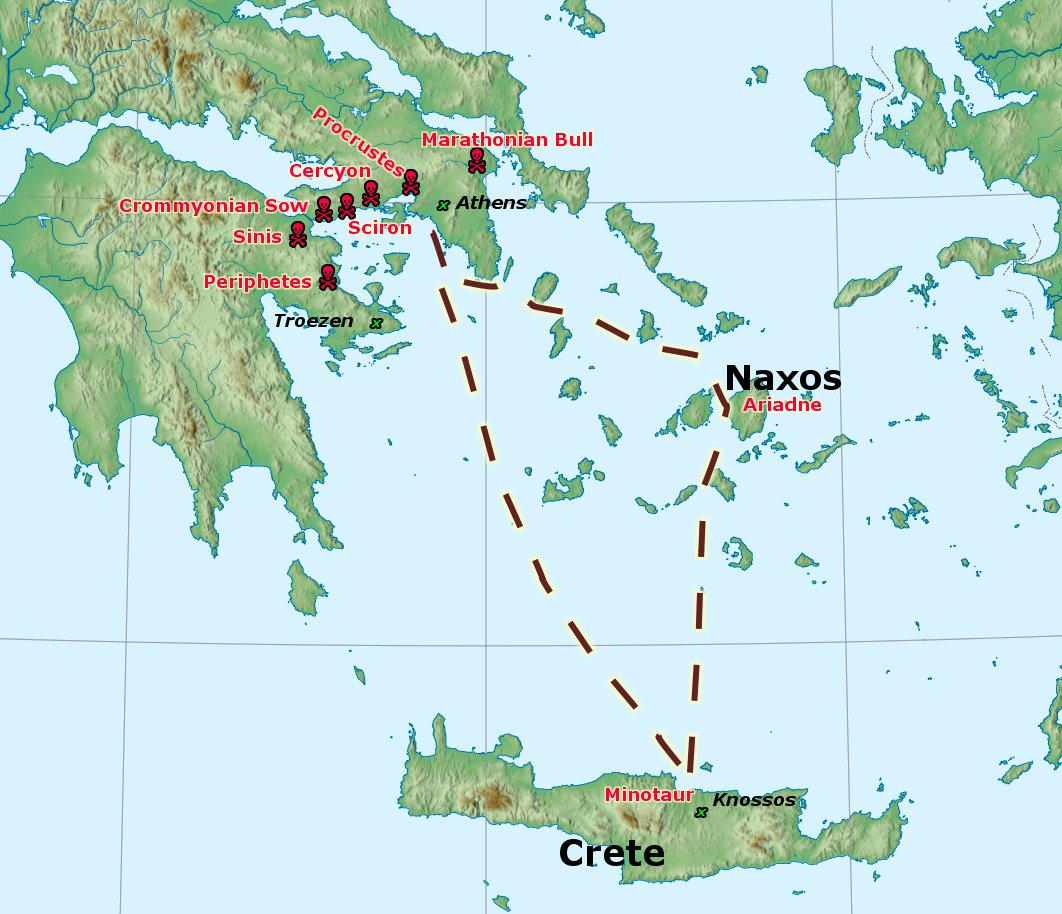
Map of Theseus's labours

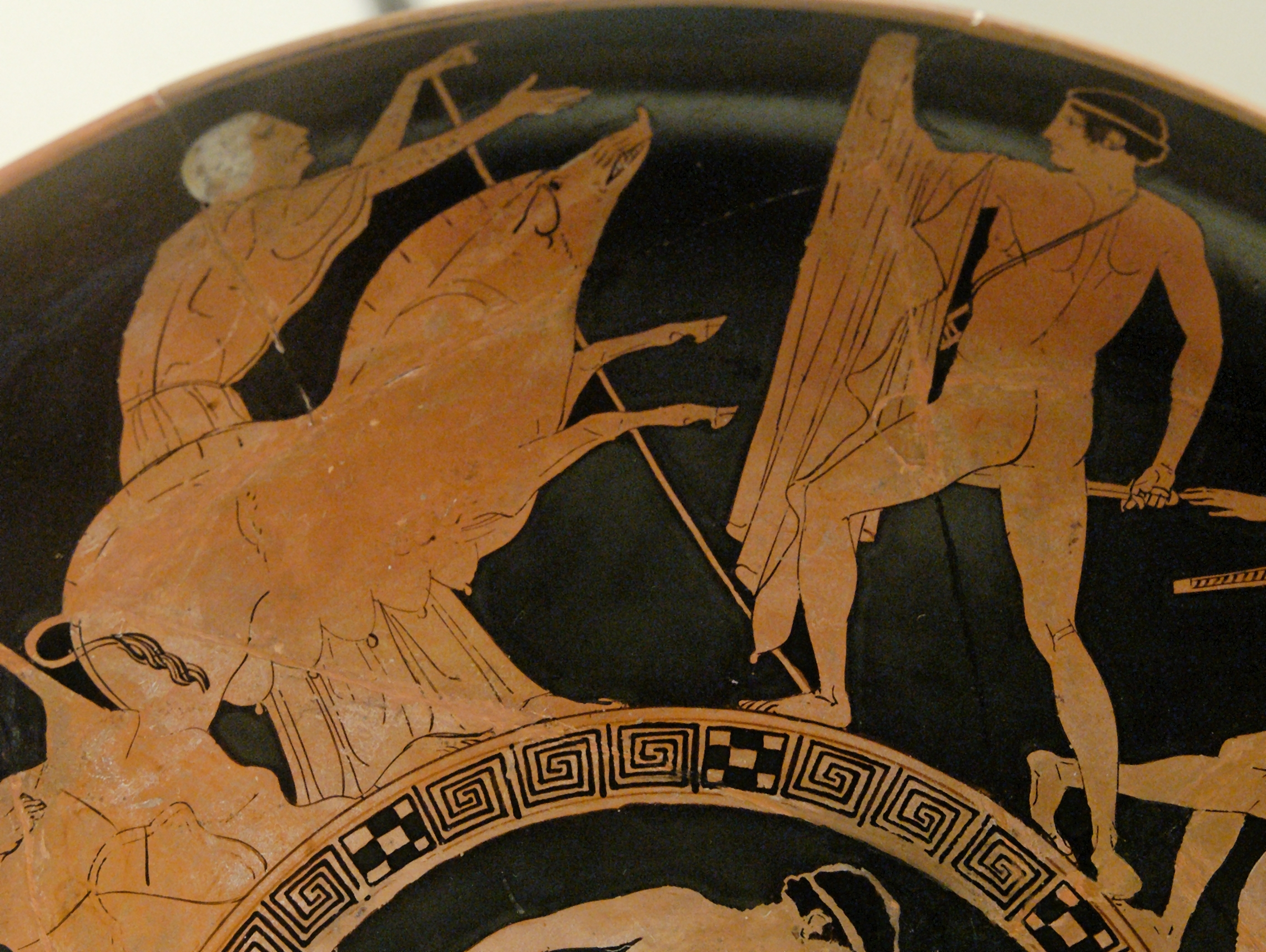
Theseus and the Crommyonian Sow, with Phaea (detail of a kylix)

The six entrances to the underworld, more commonly known as the Six Labours, are as follows:

- At the first site, which was Epidaurus, sacred to Apollo and the healer Asclepius, Theseus turned the tables on the chthonic bandit, Periphetes, the Club Bearer, who beat his opponents into the Earth, taking from him the stout staff that often identifies Theseus in vase-paintings.
- At the Isthmian entrance to the Underworld was a robber named Sinis, often called "Pityokamptes" (Ancient Greek: Πιτυοκάμπτης, lit. 'he who bends Pinetrees'). He would capture travelers, tie them between two pine trees that were bent down to the ground, and then let the trees go, tearing his victims apart. Theseus slew him by his own method. He then seduced Sinis's daughter, Perigune, fathering the child Melanippus.
- In another deed north of the Isthmus, at a place called Crommyon, he killed an enormous pig, the Crommyonian Sow, bred by an old crone named Phaea. Some versions name the sow herself as Phaea. The Bibliotheca by Pseudo-Apollodorus described the Crommyonian Sow as an offspring of Typhon and Echidna.
- Near Megara, a robber named Sciron forced travelers along the narrow cliff-face pathway to wash his feet. While they knelt, he kicked them off the cliff behind them, where they were eaten by a giant turtle (or, in some versions, a sea monster). Theseus pushed him off the cliff where he was eaten as well.
- Another of these enemies was Cercyon, king at the holy site of Eleusis, who challenged passers-by to a wrestling match and, when he had beaten them, killed them. Theseus beat Cercyon at wrestling and then killed him instead.
- The last bandit was Procrustes the Stretcher, who had two beds, one of which he offered to passers-by in the plain of Eleusis. He then made them fit into it, either by stretching them or by cutting off their feet. Since he had two beds of different lengths, no one would fit. Theseus once again employed Procrustes's own method on him, cutting off his legs and decapitating him with his axe.

== Medea, the Marathonian Bull, Androgeus, and the Pallantides ==
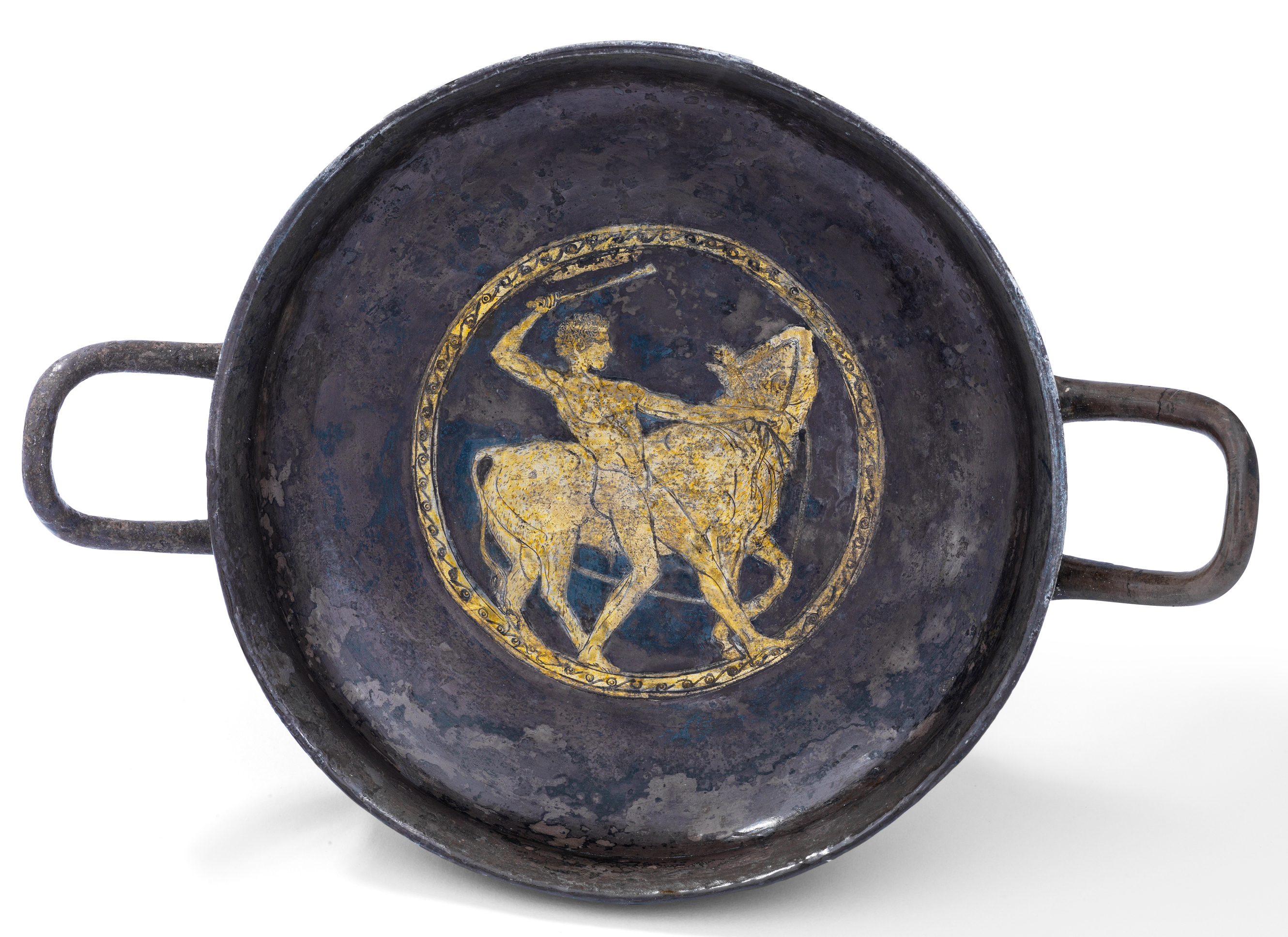
Silver kylix with Theseus and the Marathon bull, 445–440 BC, part of the Vassil Bojkov collection, Sofia, Bulgaria

When Theseus arrived in Athens, he did not reveal his true identity immediately. Aegeus gave him hospitality but was suspicious of the young, powerful stranger's intentions. Aegeus's consort Medea recognized Theseus immediately as Aegeus's son and worried that Theseus would be chosen as heir to Aegeus's kingdom instead of her son Medus. She tried to arrange to have Theseus killed by asking him to capture the Marathonian Bull, an emblem of Cretan power.

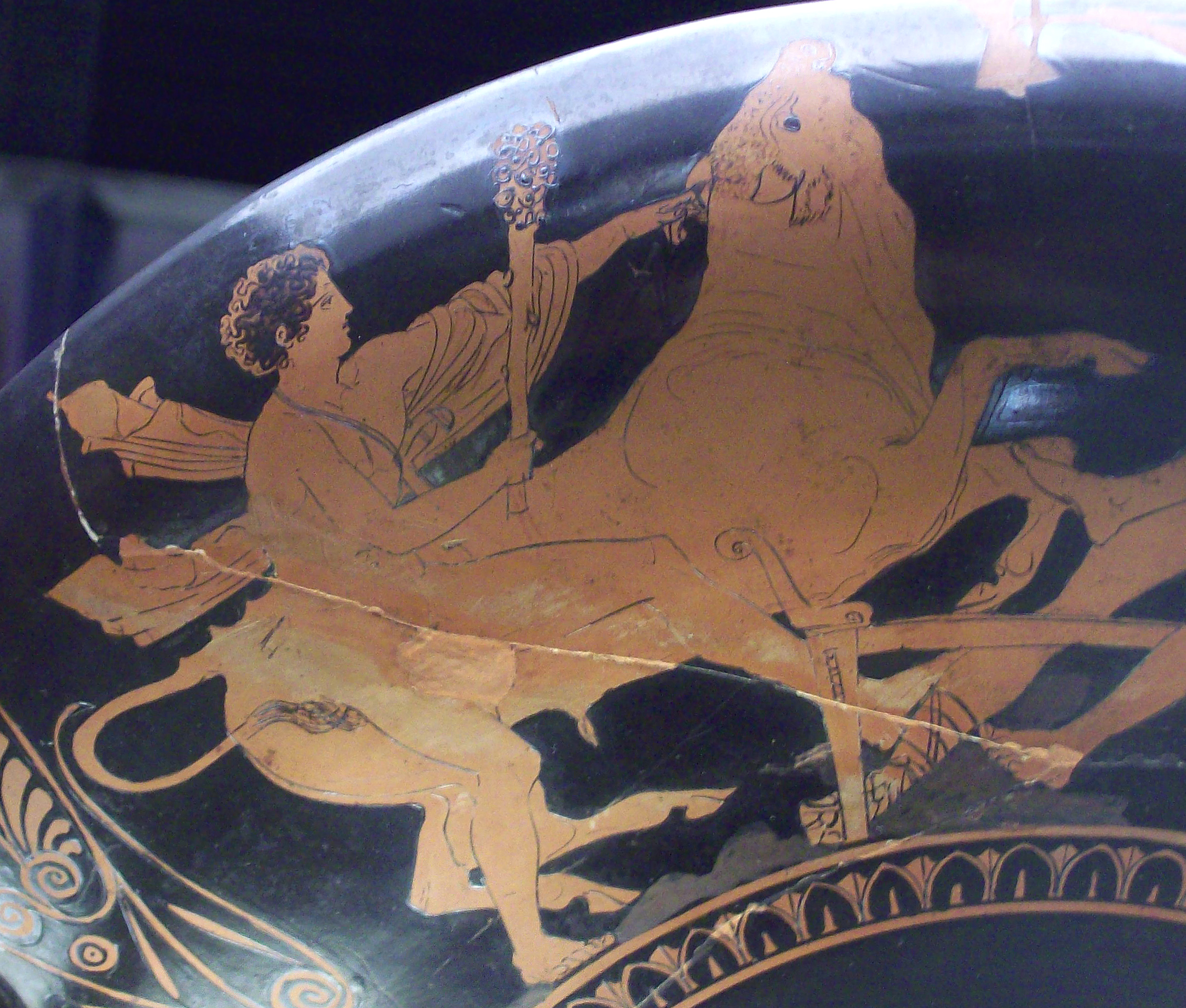
Theseus captures the Marathonian Bull (kylix painted by Aison, 5th century BC)

On the way to Marathon Theseus took shelter from a storm in the hut of an ancient woman named Hecale. She swore to make a sacrifice to Zeus if Theseus were successful in capturing the bull. Theseus did capture the bull, but when he returned to Hecale's hut she was dead. In her honor Theseus gave her name to one of the demes of Attica, making its inhabitants in a sense her adopted children.

When Theseus returned victorious to Athens, where he sacrificed the Bull, Medea tried to poison him. At the last second Aegeus recognized the sandals and the sword and knocked the poisoned wine cup from Theseus's hands. Thus father and son were reunited and Medea fled to Asia.

When Theseus appeared in the town his reputation had preceded him as a result of his having traveled along the notorious coastal road from Troezen and slain some of the most feared bandits there. It was not long before the Pallantides' hopes of succeeding the childless Aegeus would be lost if they did not get rid of Theseus (the Pallantides were the sons of Pallas and nephews of King Aegeus, who was then living at the royal court in the sanctuary of Delphic Apollo). So they set a trap for him. One band of them would march on the town from one side while another lay in wait near a place called Gargettus in ambush. The plan was that after Theseus, Aegeus, and the palace guards had been forced out the front, the other half would surprise them from behind. However, Theseus was not fooled. Informed of the plan by a herald named Leos, he crept out of the city at midnight and surprised the Pallantides. "Theseus then fell suddenly upon the party lying in ambush, and slew them all. Thereupon the party with Pallas dispersed," Plutarch reported.

== Theseus and the Minotaur ==
Pasiphaë, wife of King Minos of Crete, had several children. The eldest of these, Androgeus, set sail for Athens to take part in the Panathenaic Games, which were held there every four years. Being strong and skillful, he did very well, winning some events outright. He soon became a crowd favorite, much to the resentment of the Pallantides, who assassinated him, incurring the wrath of Minos.

When King Minos heard what had befallen his son, he ordered the Cretan fleet to set sail for Athens. Minos asked Aegeus for his son's assassins, saying that if they were to be handed to him, the city would be spared. However, not knowing who the assassins were, King Aegeus surrendered the whole city to Minos's mercy. His retribution was to stipulate that at the end of every Great Year, which occurred after every seven cycles on the solar calendar, the seven most courageous youths and the seven most beautiful maidens were to board a boat and be sent as tribute to Crete, never to be seen again.

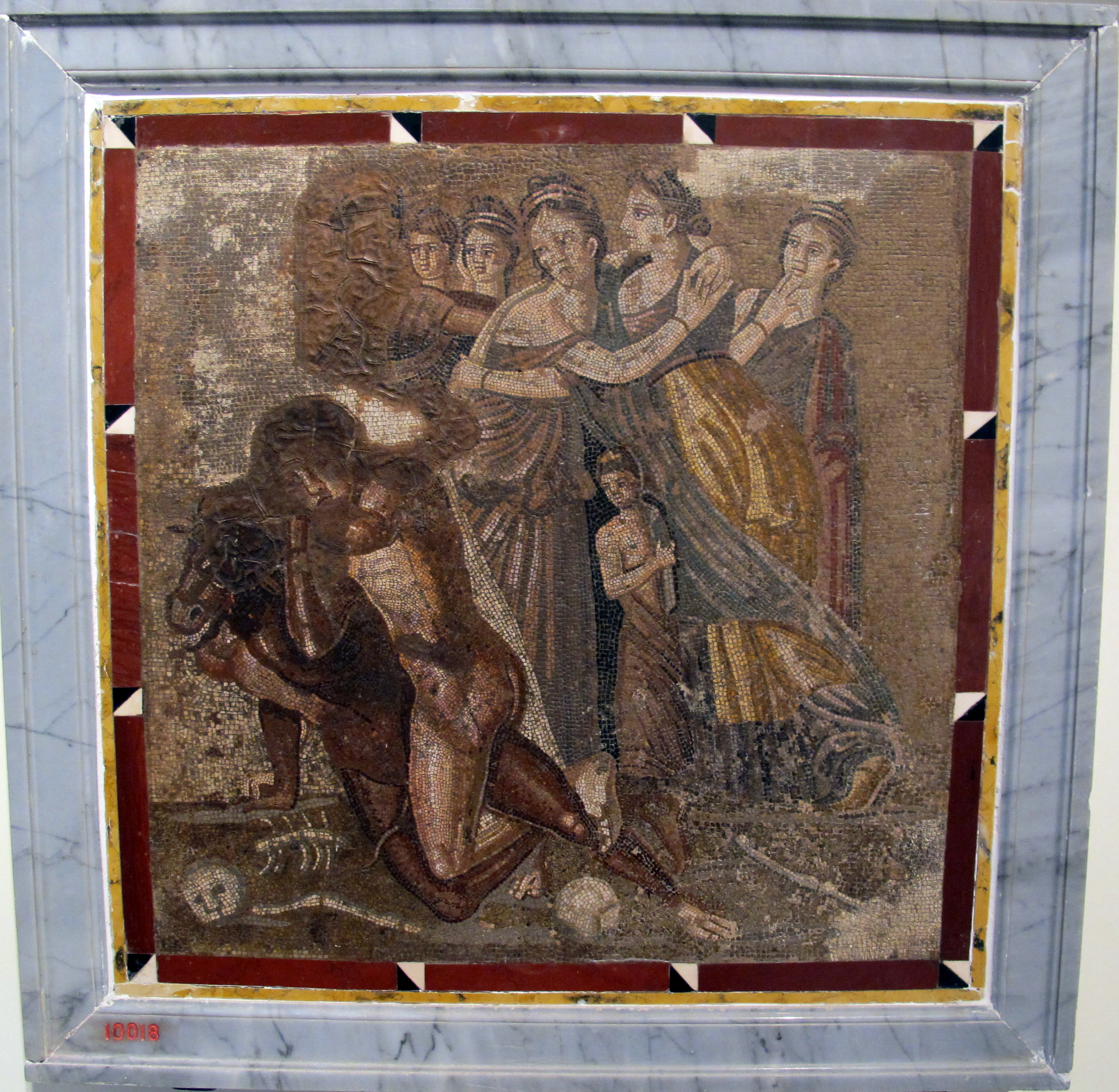
Mosaic from Chieti depicting Theseus fighting the Minotaur, National Archaeological Museum, Naples, 1st c. BC – 1st c. AD

In another version King Minos had waged war with the Athenians and was successful. He then demanded that, at nine-year intervals, seven Athenian boys and seven Athenian girls were to be sent to Crete to be devoured by the Minotaur, a half-man, half-bull monster that lived in the Labyrinth created by Daedalus.

On the third occasion, Theseus volunteered to talk to the monster to stop this horror. He took the place of one of the youths and set off with a black sail, promising to his father, Aegeus, that if successful he would return with a white sail. (Note: Plutarch quotes Simonides to the effect that the alternate sail given by Aegeus was not white, but "a scarlet sail dyed with the tender flower of luxuriant holm oak." (Plutarch, 17.5).) Like the others, Theseus was stripped of his weapons when they sailed. On his arrival in Crete, Ariadne, King Minos's daughter, fell in love with Theseus and, on the advice of Daedalus, gave him a ball of thread (a clew), so he could find his way out of the Labyrinth. (Note: Ariadne is sometimes represented in vase-paintings with the thread wound on her spindle.) That night, Ariadne escorted Theseus to the Labyrinth, and Theseus promised that if he returned from the Labyrinth he would take Ariadne with him. As soon as Theseus entered the Labyrinth, he tied one end of the ball of string to the doorpost and brandished his sword which he had kept hidden from the guards inside his tunic. Theseus followed Daedalus's instructions given to Ariadne: go forwards, always down, and never left or right. Theseus came to the heart of the Labyrinth and upon the sleeping Minotaur. The beast awoke and a tremendous fight occurred. Theseus overpowered the Minotaur with his strength and stabbed the beast in the throat with his sword (according to one scholium on Pindar's Fifth Nemean Ode, Theseus strangled it).

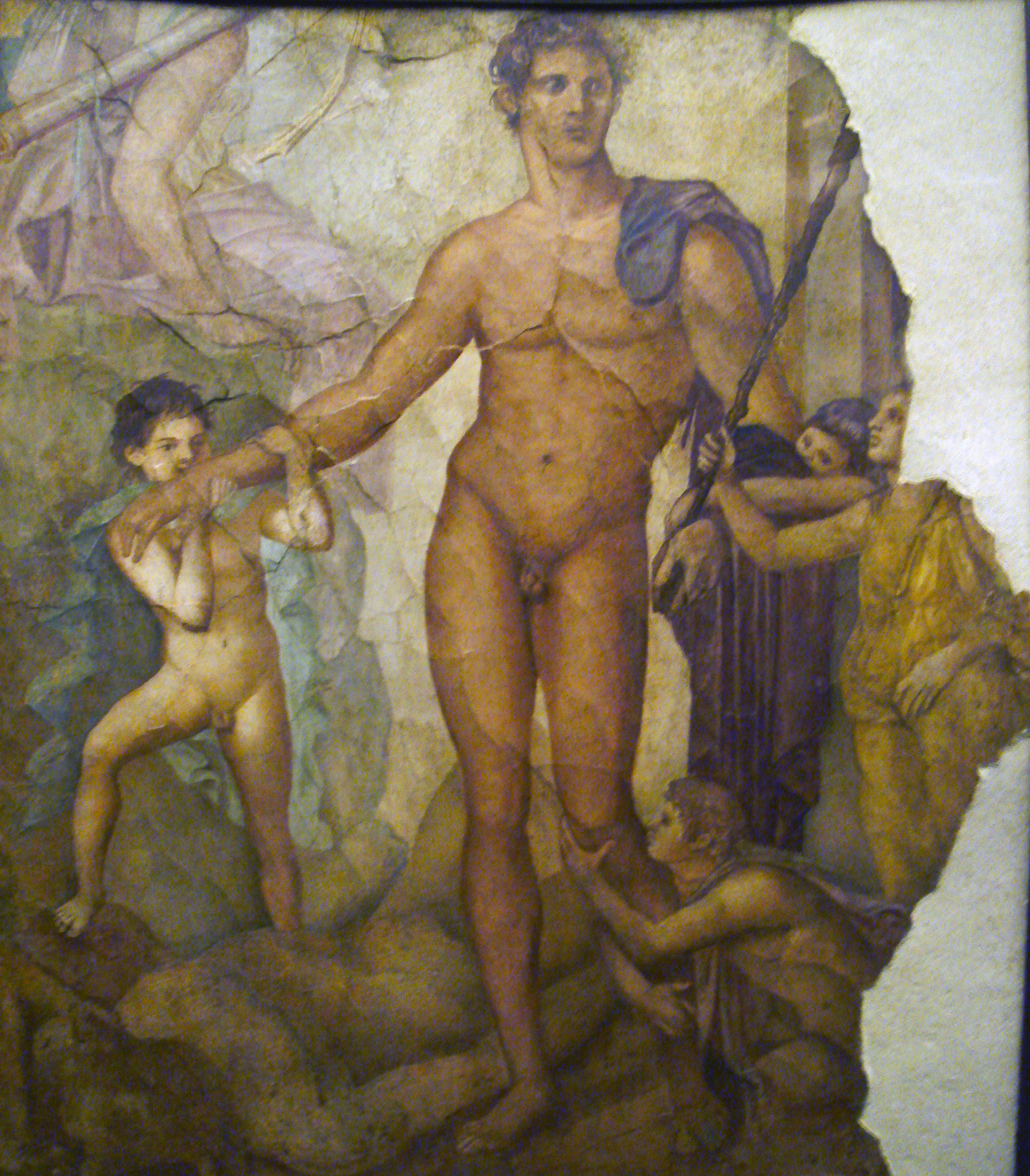
Theseus on an antique fresco from Herculaneum

After decapitating the beast Theseus used the string to escape the Labyrinth and managed to escape with all of the young Athenians and Ariadne as well as her younger sister Phaedra. Then he and the rest of the crew fell asleep on the beach of the island of Naxos, where they stopped on their way back, looking for water. Theseus then abandoned Ariadne, where Dionysus eventually found and married her. On his way back from Crete, he also stopped on the island of Delos, where, according to Plutarch, "Theseus danced with the young Athenians a dance still performed by the inhabitants of the island, consisting of twisting and twisted movements that reproduce the shapes of the labyrinth. Dicearchos states that this dance is called 'Crane'." Theseus forgot to put up the white sails instead of the black ones, so his father, the king, believing he was dead, committed suicide, throwing himself off a cliff of Sounion and into the sea, causing this body of water to be named the Aegean Sea.

== Ship of Theseus ==
According to Plutarch's Life of Theseus, the ship Theseus used on his return from Minoan Crete to Athens was kept in the Athenian harbor as a memorial for several centuries.

The ship wherein Theseus and the youth of Athens returned had thirty oars, and was preserved by the Athenians down even to the time of Demetrius Phalereus, (Note: Demetrius Phalereus was a distinguished orator and statesman, who governed Athens for a decade before being exiled, in 307 BCE.) for they took away the old planks as they decayed, putting in new and stronger timber in their place ...

The ship had to be maintained in a seaworthy state, for, in return for Theseus's successful mission, the Athenians had pledged to honor Apollo every year henceforth. Thus, the Athenians sent a religious mission to the island of Delos (one of Apollo's most sacred sanctuaries) on the Athenian state galley—the ship itself—to pay their fealty to the god. To preserve the purity of the occasion, no executions were permitted between the time when the religious ceremony began to when the ship returned from Delos, which took several weeks.

To preserve the ship, any wood that wore out or rotted was replaced; it was thus unclear to philosophers how much of the original ship remained, giving rise to the philosophical question of whether it should be considered "the same" ship or not. Such philosophical questions about the nature of identity are sometimes referred to as the "Ship of Theseus" paradox.

Regardless of these issues, the Athenians preserved the ship. They believed that Theseus had been an actual, historical figure and the ship gave them a tangible connection to their divine provenance.

== Theseus and Pirithous ==
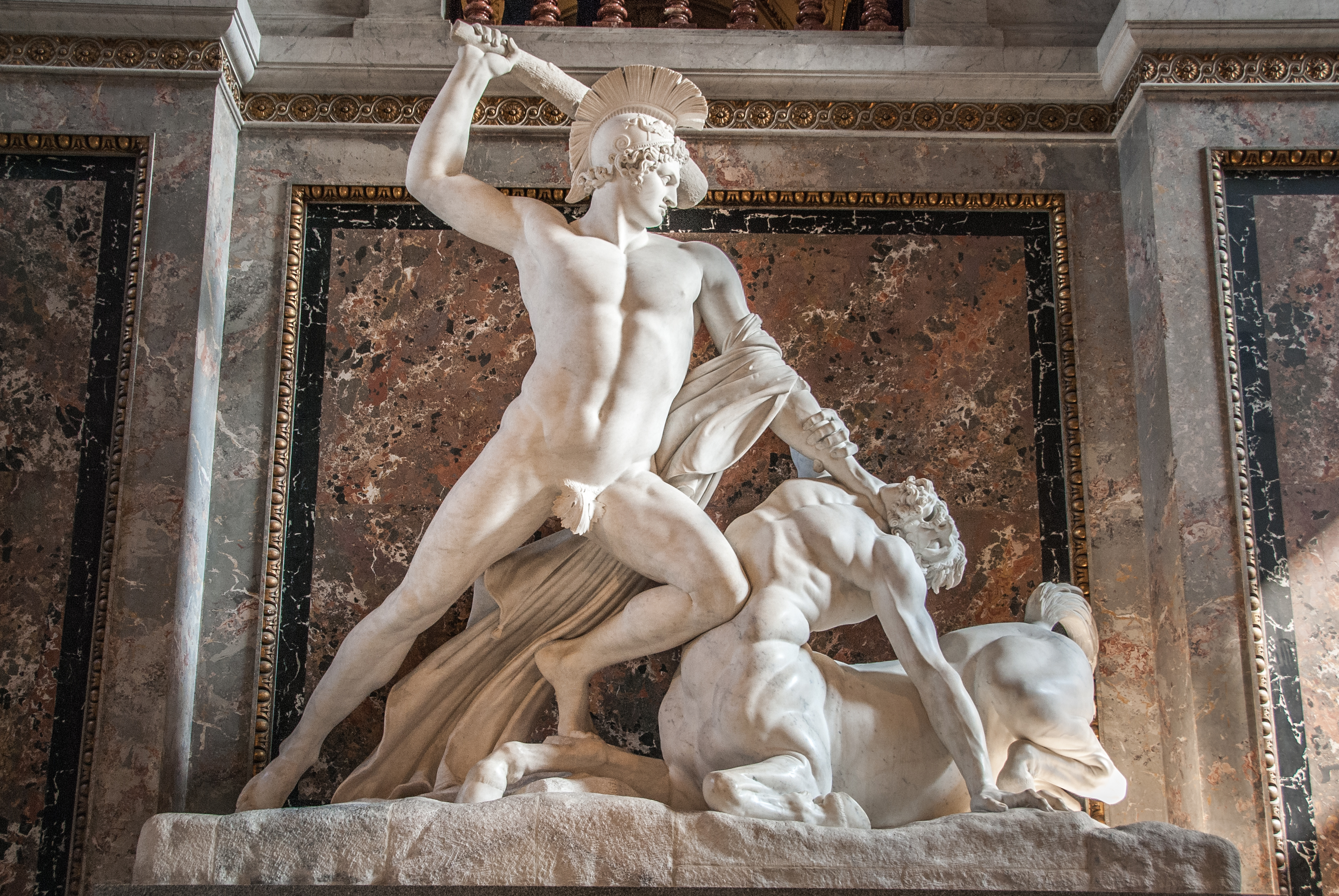
Theseus Defeats the Centaur by Antonio Canova (1804–1819), Kunsthistorisches Museum

Theseus's best friend was Pirithous, king of the Lapiths. Pirithous had heard stories of Theseus's courage and strength in battle but wanted proof so he rustled Theseus's herd of cattle and drove it from Marathon and Theseus set out in pursuit. Pirithous took up his arms and the pair met to do battle but were so impressed with each other's gracefulness, beauty and courage they took an oath of friendship and joined the Calydonian boar hunt.

In Iliad I, Nestor numbers Pirithous and Theseus "of heroic fame" among an earlier generation of heroes of his youth, "the strongest men that Earth has bred, the strongest men against the strongest enemies, a savage mountain-dwelling tribe whom they utterly destroyed." No trace of such an oral tradition, which Homer's listeners would have recognized in Nestor's allusion, survived in the literary epic. Later, Pirithous was preparing to marry Hippodamia. The centaurs were guests at the wedding feast, but got drunk and tried to abduct the women, including Hippodamia. The Lapiths won the ensuing battle.

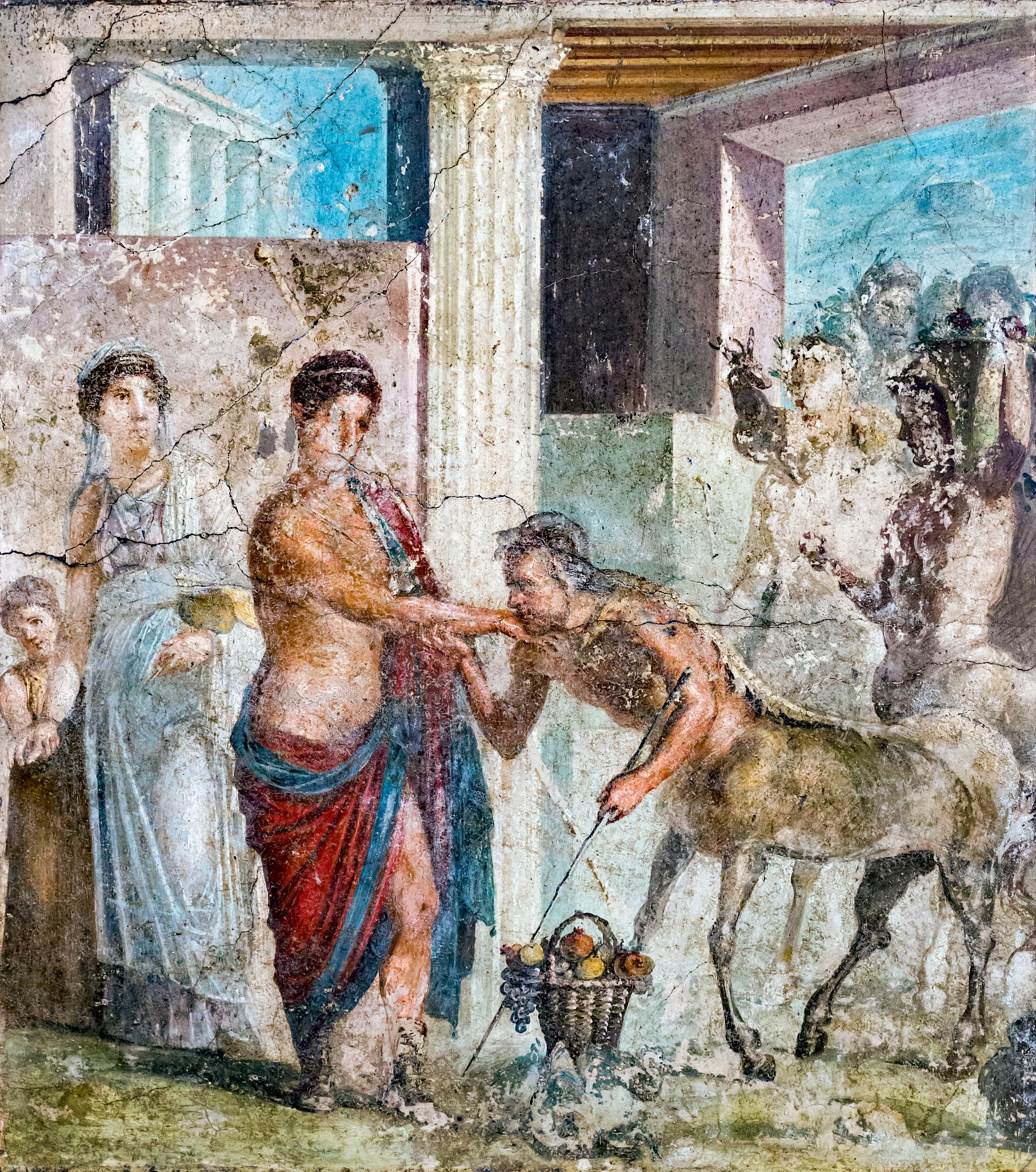
Pirithous and Hippodamia receiving the centaurs at his wedding. Antique fresco from Pompeii

In Ovid's Metamorphoses Theseus fights against and kills Eurytus, the "fiercest of all the fierce centaurs" at the wedding of Pirithous and Hippodamia.

Also according to Ovid, Phaedra, Theseus's wife, felt left out by her husband's love for Pirithous and she used this as an excuse to try to convince her stepson, Hippolytus, to accept being her lover, as Theseus also neglected his son because he preferred to spend long periods with his companion.

=== Abduction of Persephone and encounter with Hades ===
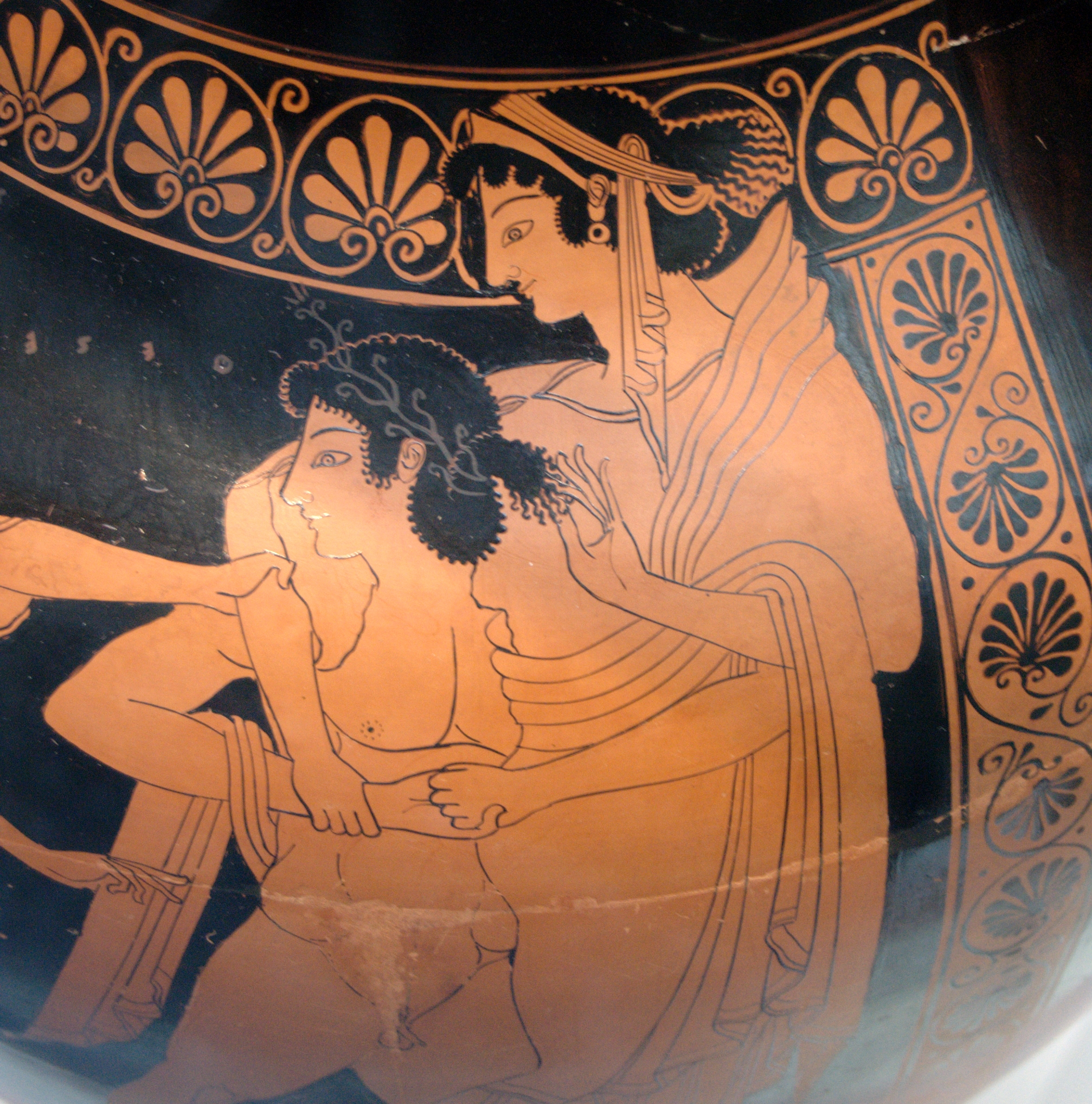
Theseus carries off Helen, on an Attic red-figure amphora, c. 510 BC

Theseus and his bosom companion, Pirithous, since they were sons of Zeus and Poseidon, pledged themselves to marry daughters of Zeus. Theseus, in an old tradition, chose Helen, and together they kidnapped her, intending to keep her until she was old enough to marry. Pirithous chose Persephone, even though she was already married to Hades, king of the underworld. They left Helen with Theseus's mother, Aethra at Aphidna, whence she was rescued by the Dioscuri.

On Pirithous's behalf they rather unwisely traveled to the underworld, domain of Persephone and her husband, Hades. As they wandered through the outskirts of Tartarus, Theseus sat down to rest on a rock. As he did so he felt his limbs change and grow stiff. He tried to rise but could not. He was fixed to the rock. As he turned to cry out to his friend, he saw that Pirithous too was crying out. Around him gathered the terrible band of Furies with snakes in their hair, torches and long whips in their hands. Before these monsters the hero's courage failed and he was led away to eternal punishment.

For many months in half-darkness, Theseus sat immovably fixed to the rock, mourning for both his friend and for himself. In the end he was rescued by Heracles, who had come to the underworld for his 12th task. There he persuaded Persephone to forgive him for the part he had taken in the rash venture of Pirithous. So Theseus was restored to the upper air but Pirithous never left the kingdom of the dead, for when Heracles tried to free him the underworld shook. They then decided the task was beyond any hero and left. When Theseus returned to Athens he found that the Dioscuri had taken Helen and Aethra to Sparta.

== Phaedra and Hippolytus ==
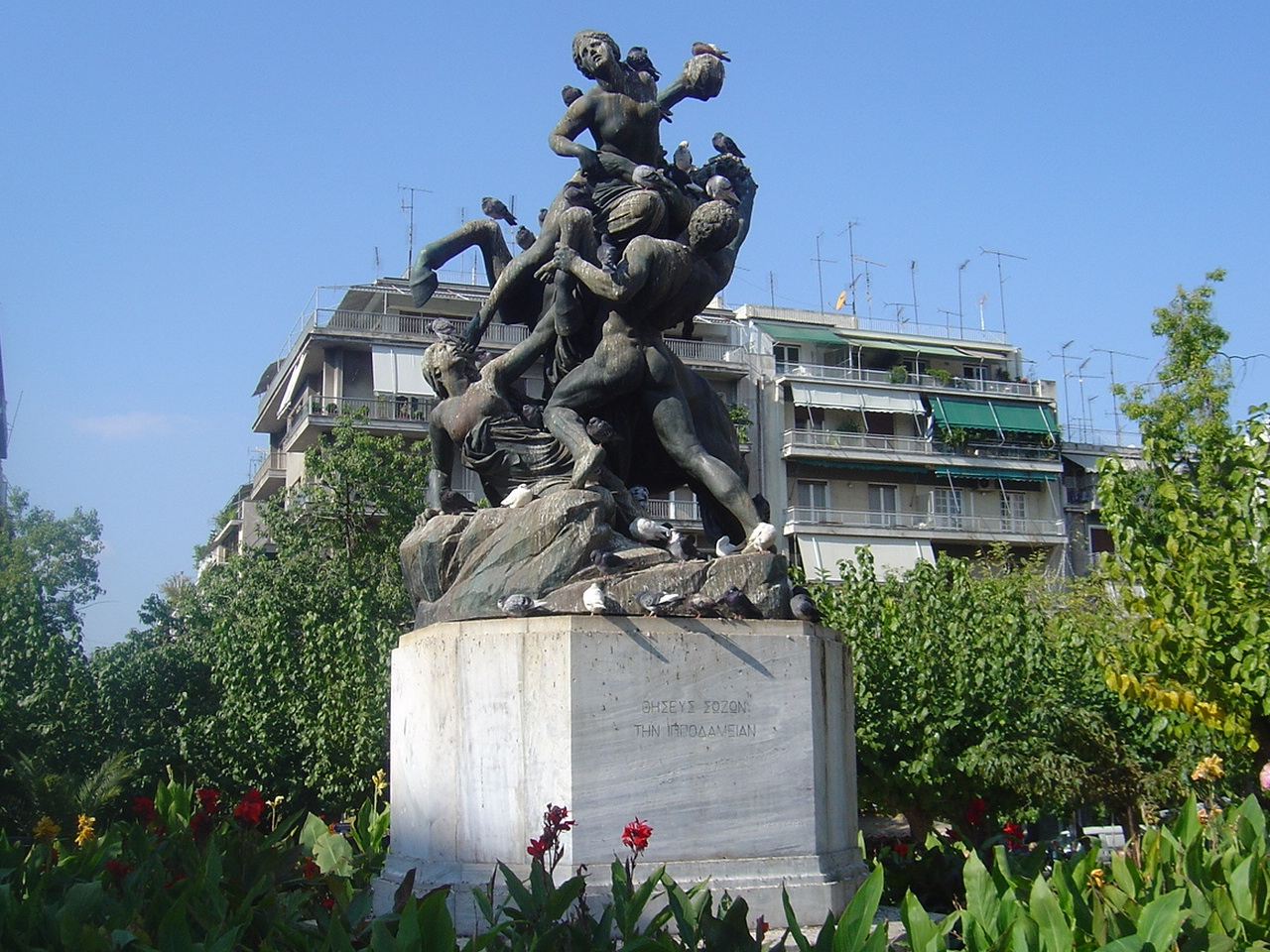
Theseus saves Hippodameia, work by Johannes Pfuhl in Athens

Phaedra, Theseus's second wife and the daughter of King Minos, bore Theseus two sons, Demophon and Acamas. While these two were still in their infancy, Phaedra fell in love with Hippolytus, Theseus's son by the Amazon queen Hippolyta. According to some versions of the story, Hippolytus had scorned Aphrodite to become a follower of Artemis, so Aphrodite made Phaedra fall in love with him as punishment. He rejected her out of chastity.

Alternatively, in Euripides's version, Hippolytus, Phaedra's nurse told Hippolytus of her mistress's love and he swore he would not reveal the nurse as his source of information. To ensure that she would die with dignity, Phaedra wrote to Theseus on a tablet claiming that Hippolytus had raped her before hanging herself. Theseus believed her and used one of the three wishes he had received from Poseidon against his son. The curse caused Hippolytus's horses to be frightened by a sea monster, usually a bull, and to drag their rider to his death. Artemis would later tell Theseus the truth, promising to avenge her loyal follower on another follower of Aphrodite.

In a version recounted by the Roman playwright Seneca, entitled Phaedra, after Phaedra told Theseus that Hippolytus had raped her, Theseus called upon Neptune (as he did Poseidon in Euripides's interpretation) to kill his son. Upon hearing the news of Hippolytus's death at the hands of Neptune's sea monster, Phaedra committed suicide out of guilt, for she had not intended for Hippolytus to die.

In yet another version, Phaedra simply told Theseus Hippolytus had raped her and did not kill herself. Dionysus sent a wild bull that terrified Hippolytus's horses.

A cult grew up around Hippolytus, associated with the cult of Aphrodite. Girls who were about to be married offered locks of their hair to him. The cult believed that Asclepius had resurrected Hippolytus and that he lived in a sacred forest near Aricia in Latium.

== Other stories and death of Theseus ==
According to some sources, Theseus also was one of the Argonauts, although Apollonius of Rhodes states in the Argonautica that Theseus was still in the underworld at this time. Both statements are inconsistent with Medea being Aegeus's wife by the time Theseus first came to Athens. With Phaedra, Theseus fathered Acamas, who was one of those who hid in the Trojan Horse during the Trojan War. Theseus welcomed the wandering Oedipus and helped Adrastus to bury the Seven against Thebes.

Pausanias wrote that on the road through the mountains from Troezen to Hermione there was a large rock that was originally called the altar of Zeus Sthenius, but was later renamed the Rock of Theseus, because Theseus took up the sword and sandals of his father from beneath it.

Theseus was regarded in legendary tradition as the founder of Pythopolis in Anatolia. According to the myth, he established the city after the death of Solois, one of his companions during an expedition to the Amazons. Grieving over the young man's death, Theseus remembered an oracle from Delphi instructing him to found a city whenever he suffered great sorrow in a foreign land. He therefore founded Pythopolis, "city of the Pythian god", referring to Apollo of Delphi, and left some of his followers there.

Lycomedes of the island of Skyros threw Theseus off a cliff after he had lost popularity in Athens. In 475 BC, in response to an oracle, Cimon of Athens, having conquered Skyros for the Athenians, identified as the remains of Theseus "a coffin of a great corpse with a bronze spear-head by its side and a sword." (Plutarch, Life of Theseus). The remains found by Cimon were reburied in Athens. The early modern name Theseion (Temple of Theseus) was mistakenly applied to the Temple of Hephaestus which was thought to be the actual site of the hero's tomb.

== Adaptations of the myth ==
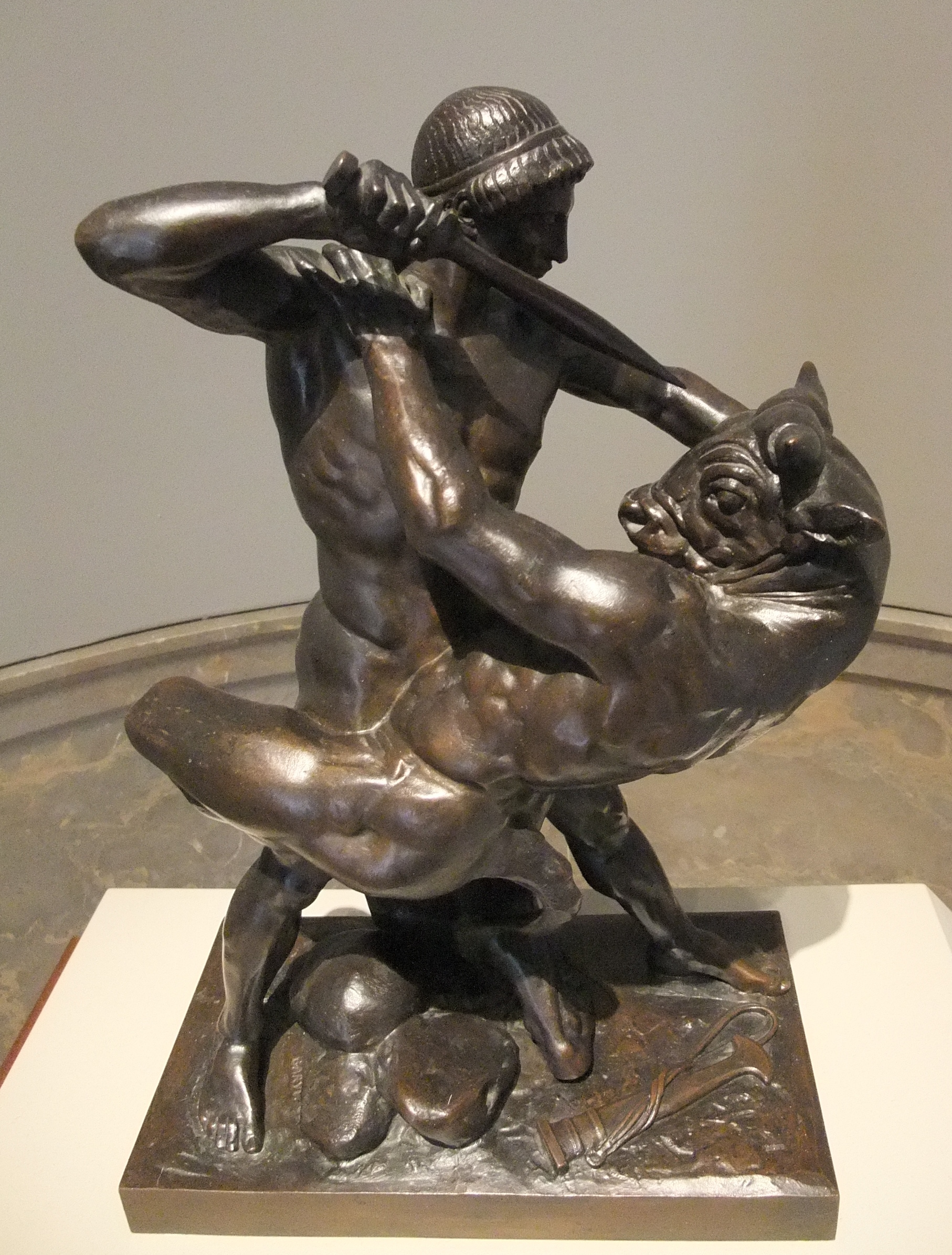
Theseus Slaying Minotaur (1843), bronze sculpture by Antoine-Louis Barye

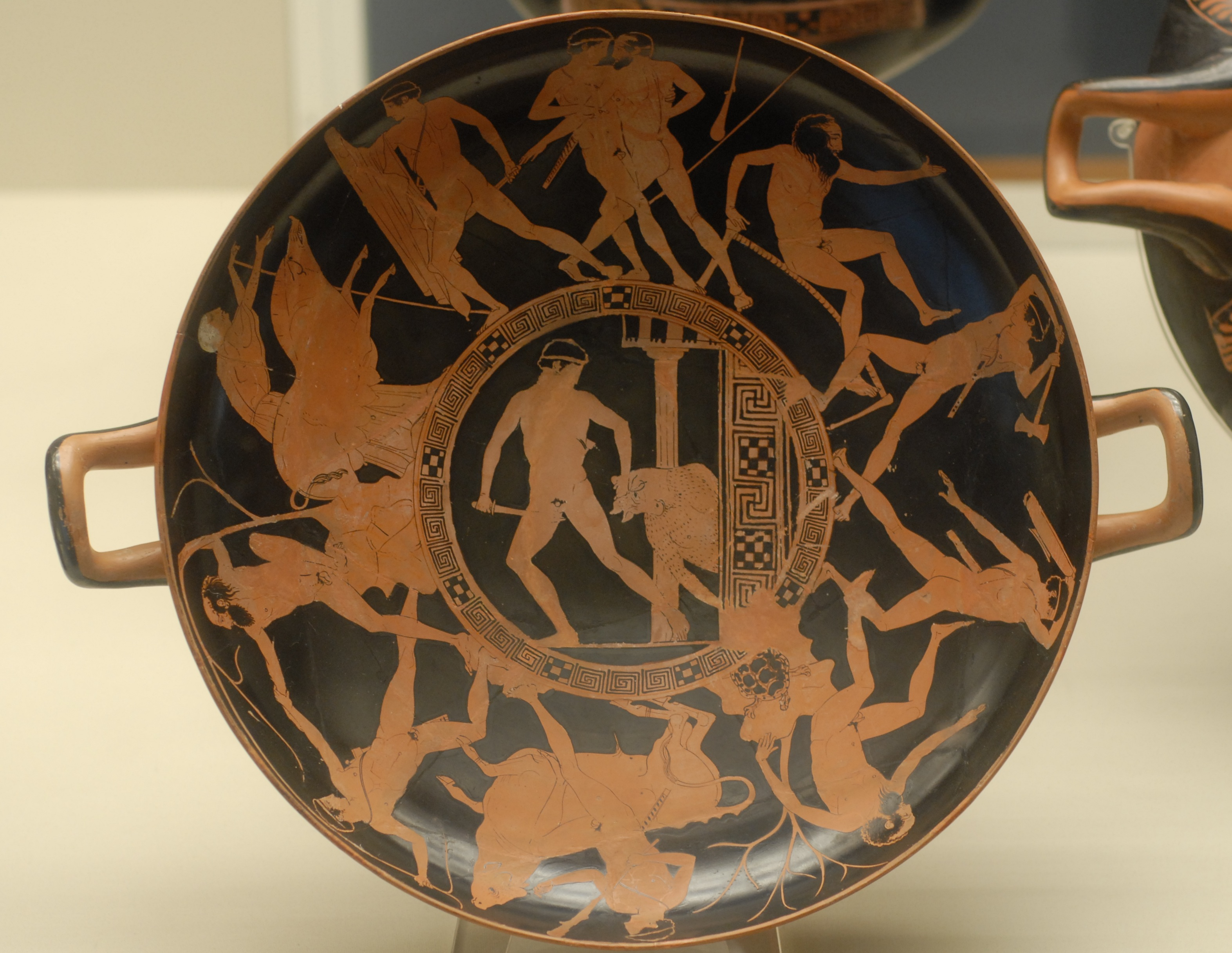
The deeds of Theseus, on an Attic red-figured kylix, c. 440–430 BC (British Museum)

=== Literature ===
- In the sixth century BCE, an unknown poet composed a now lost epic, the Theseïs, recounting the most famous myths associated with Theseus.
- Sophocles's tragedy Oedipus at Colonus features Theseus as a major character.
- Euripides's tragedy Hippolytus and Seneca's Phaedra revolve around the death of Theseus's son.
- In Geoffrey Chaucer's epic chivalric romance "The Knight's Tale", one of the Canterbury Tales, Theseus is the duke of Athens, husband of Ypolita, and protector of Emelye, Ypolita's sister, for whom the two knights of Thebes, Arcite and Palamon, do battle.
- Jakob Ayrer wrote the play Theseus (1618).
- Racine's Phèdre (1677) features Theseus as well as Hippolytus and the title character Phaedra.
- Theseus is a prominent character as the Duke of Athens in William Shakespeare's plays, A Midsummer Night's Dream and The Two Noble Kinsmen. Hippolyta also appears in both plays.
- In the 1898 short novel The Story of Perseus and the Gorgon's Head the mythical story of Theseus is described.
- Robert Walser wrote a comical feuilleton "Theseus" published in 1920, collected in English in Speaking to the Rose.
- F. L. Lucas's epic poem Ariadne (1932) is an epic reworking of the Labyrinth myth: Aegle, one of the sacrificial maidens who accompany Theseus to Crete, is Theseus's sweetheart, the Minotaur is Minos himself in a bull-mask, and Ariadne, learning on Naxos of Theseus's earlier love for Aegle, decides to leave him for the Ideal [Dionysus].
- André Gide's Thésée (1946) is a fictional autobiography where the mythical hero of Athens, now elderly, narrates his life story from his carefree youth to his killing of the Minotaur.
- Mary Renault's The King Must Die (1958) is a dramatic retelling of the Theseus legend from his childhood in Troizen until the return from Crete to Athens. While fictional, it is generally faithful to the spirit and flavor of the best-known variations of the original story. The sequel is The Bull from the Sea (1962), about the hero's later career.
- Evangeline Walton's historical fiction novel The Sword Is Forged (1983) chronicles the story of Theseus and Antiope.
- Fran Ross's 1974 novel Oreo draws heavily from the Theseus myth.
- Stephen Dobyns wrote the poem Theseus within the Labyrinth (1986) which provides a retelling of the myth of Ariadne, Theseus and the Minotaur, in particular the feelings of Ariadne.
- In issue No. 12 of the Fright Night comic series, entitled Bull-Whipped, Theseus and the Minotaur are resurrected by the comic's Aunt Claudia Hinault, who is the reincarnation of Ariadne.
- Kir Bulychov's 1993 book An Attempt on Theseus' Life (Russian: Покушение на Тезея) is about a plot to assassinate a man during a virtual reality tour in which he lives through Theseus's life.
- Aleksey Ryabinin's book Theseus: The story of ancient gods, goddesses, kings, and warriors (2018) provides a retelling of the myths of Theseus, Aegeus, Minotaur, Ariadne, Pirithous and other personages of Greek mythology.
- Troy Denning's 1996 novel Pages of Pain features an amnesic Theseus fighting to recover his past while interacting with some of the more colorful beings of the Planescape universe.
- Steven Pressfield's novel Last of the Amazons (2002) attempts to situate Theseus's meeting and subsequent marriage to Antiope, as well as the ensuing war, in a historically plausible setting.
- Jorge Luis Borges presents a variation of the myth in a short story, "The House of Asterion" (Spanish: "La Casa de Asterión").
- British comedian Tony Robinson wrote a version of the Theseus story entitled Theseus: Super Hero.
- In Gene Wolfe's Book of the New Sun, set in a very distant future, the protagonist reads a story which appears to blend the myth of Theseus with the story of Battle of Hampton Roads – presumably because of a confusion between the Minotaur and the USS Monitor. (In this version, the Theseus character is now a student's son.)

=== Opera, film, television and video games ===
- Thésée (1675) is an early French opera by Jean-Baptiste Lully to a libretto by Philippe Quinault, based on Ovid.
- Teseo (1713) is an opera seria by George Frideric Handel to a libretto by Nicola Francesco Haym, based on Quinault.
- The opera Hippolyte et Aricie (1733) by Jean-Philippe Rameau, based on Racine, features Theseus as a character.
- The musical comedy By Jupiter (1942) by Rodgers and Hart, based on the novel The Warrior's Husband by Julian F. Thompson, features Theseus as one of the two leading men, who falls in love with Antiope, in a story radically different from the one in Greek mythology.

Regnal titles
Preceded by Aegeus	King of Athens	Succeeded by Menestheus
