= Sinis (mythology) =

Greek mythological figure

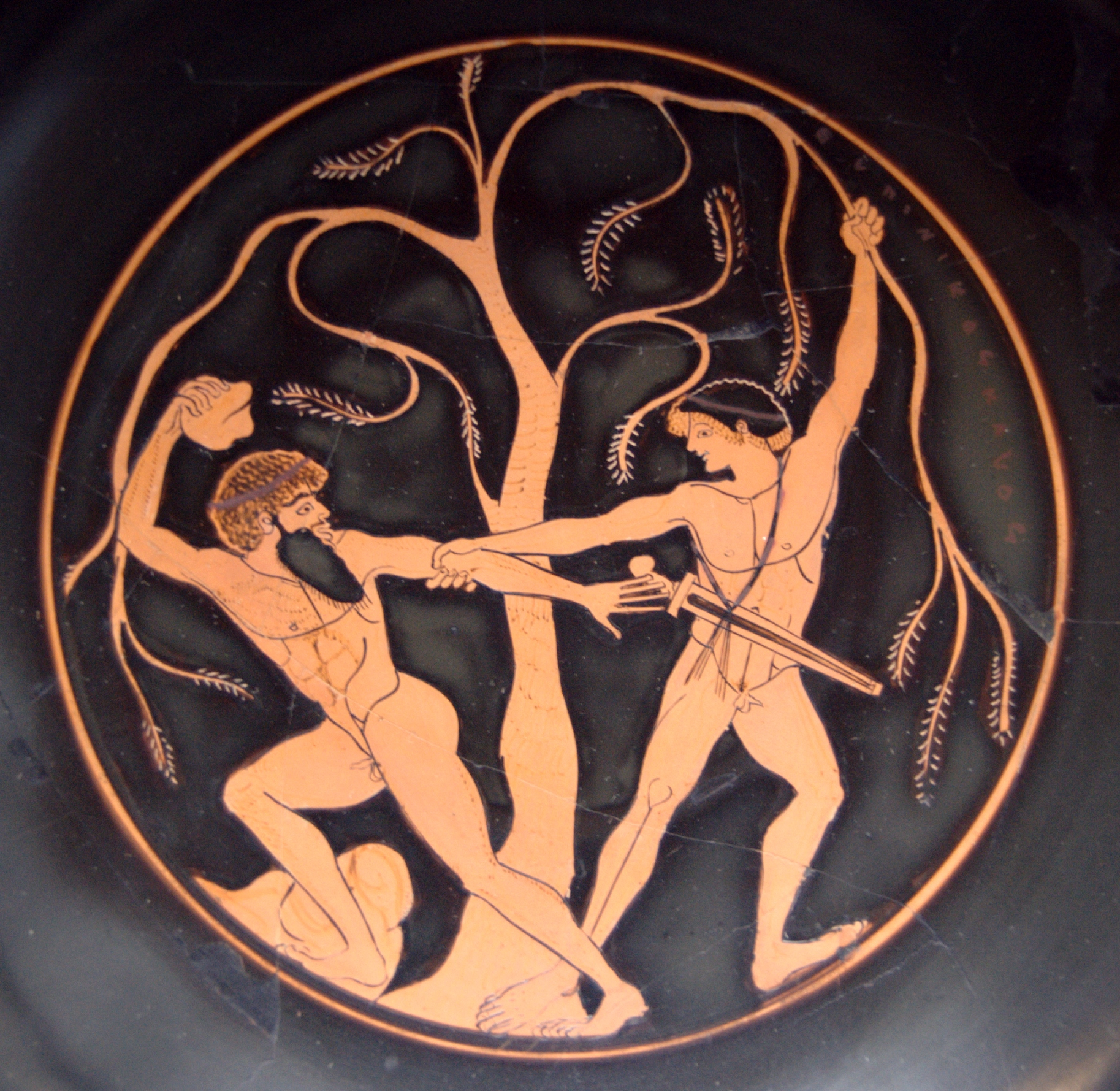
Theseus and Sinis, Attic red-figure kylix, 490–480 BC, Staatliche Antikensammlungen (Inv. 8771).

In Greek mythology, Sinis (Ancient Greek: Σίνις, romanized: Sínis) was a bandit killed by Theseus on his way to Athens.

== Family ==
Pseudo-Apollodorus describes Sinis as the son of Polypemon and Sylea, daughter of Corinthus; he has also been described as the son of Canethus and Henioche. Bacchylides states that Poseidon was his father. He was the father of Perigune.

== Mythology ==
An Isthmian outlaw, Sinis would force travelers to help him bend pine trees to the ground and then unexpectedly let go, catapulting the victims through the air. Alternative sources say that he tied people to two pine trees that he bent down to the ground, then let the trees go, tearing his victims apart. This led to him being called Pityocamptes (Πιτυοκάμπτης, Pityokámptēs, "pine-bender").

Sinis was the second bandit to be killed by Theseus as the hero was traveling from Troezen to Athens, in the very same way that he had previously killed his own victims. Theseus then slept with Sinis's daughter, Perigune, who later bore Theseus's son, Melanippus. Perigune was then given by Theseus to Deioneus of Oechalia.
