= Crommyonian Sow =

Pig in Greek mythology

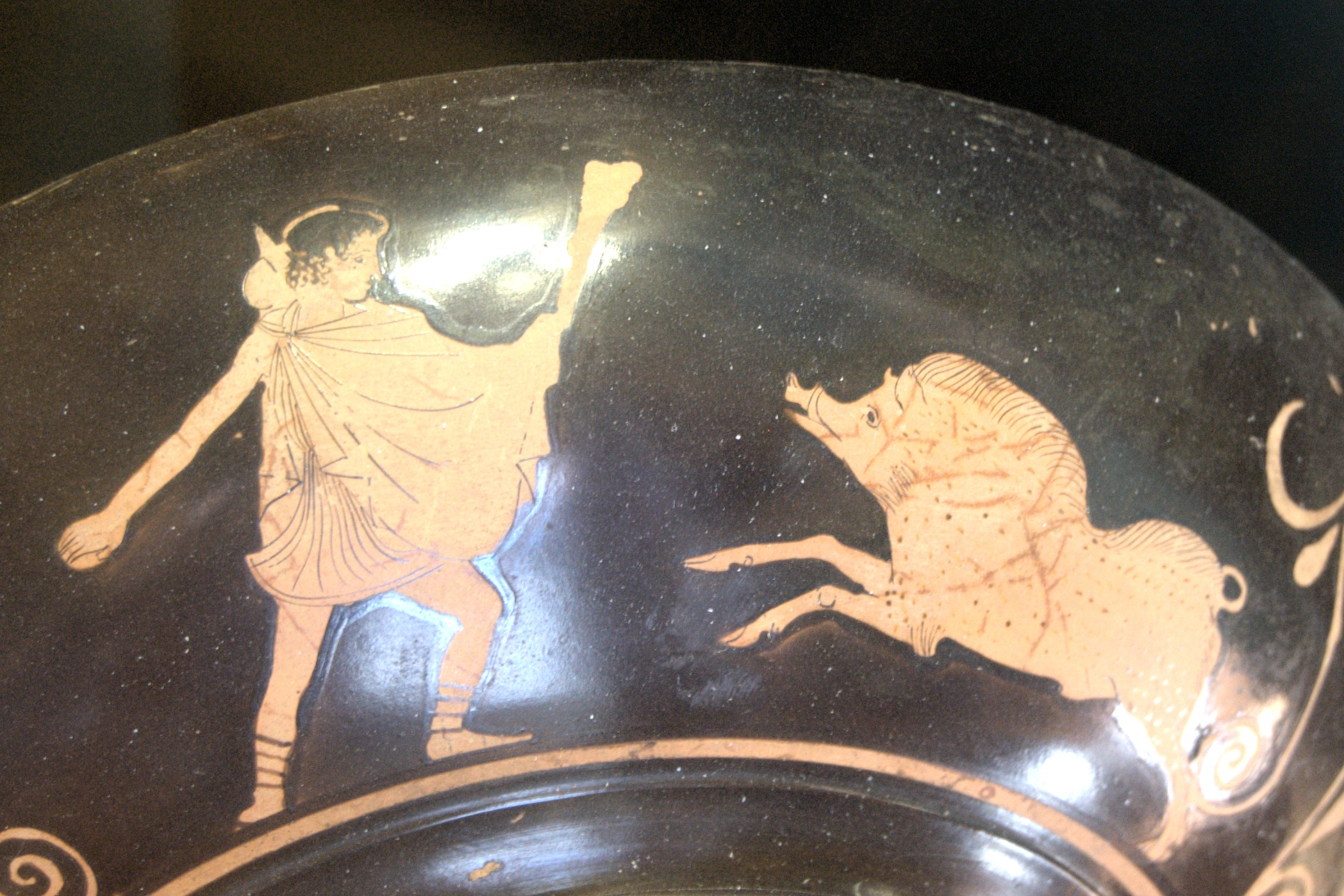
Theseus fighting against the Crommyonian Sow

The Crommyonian Sow (Ancient Greek: Ὕς Κρομμύων Hus Krommúōn) is a pig in Greek mythology. It was owned by a woman named Phaea (Φαιά Phaiā́, "grey") and was sometimes called by that name itself.

== Mythology ==
The Crommyonian Sow was a wild pig that ravaged the region around the village of Crommyon between Megara and Corinth, and was eventually slain by Theseus in his early adventures. According to the Bibliotheca of Pseudo-Apollodorus, it was said by some to be the daughter of Echidna and Typhon, and was named after the old woman who raised it. According to Strabo, the sow was said to be the mother of the Calydonian Boar. Gaius Julius Hyginus says that the pig Theseus killed at Crommyon was a boar.

Plutarch repeats the story, but states that he had also been told that Phaia herself was a murderous female robber, and was nicknamed "Sow" because of her obese children and uncouth manners, and that she was the "sow" killed by Theseus.
