= List of centaurs =

Centaurs (Note: /ˈsɛntɔːr, ˈsɛntɑːr/ SEN-tor, SEN-tar; Ancient Greek: κένταυρος, romanized: kéntauros; Latin: centaurus.) are creatures that have the upper body of a human and the lower body and legs of a horse.. Centaurs originate from Greek mythology, but have had a continued cultural influence, including through Roman mythology, medieval depictions, and modern fantastic literature and media.

== Centaurs from Greek mythology ==
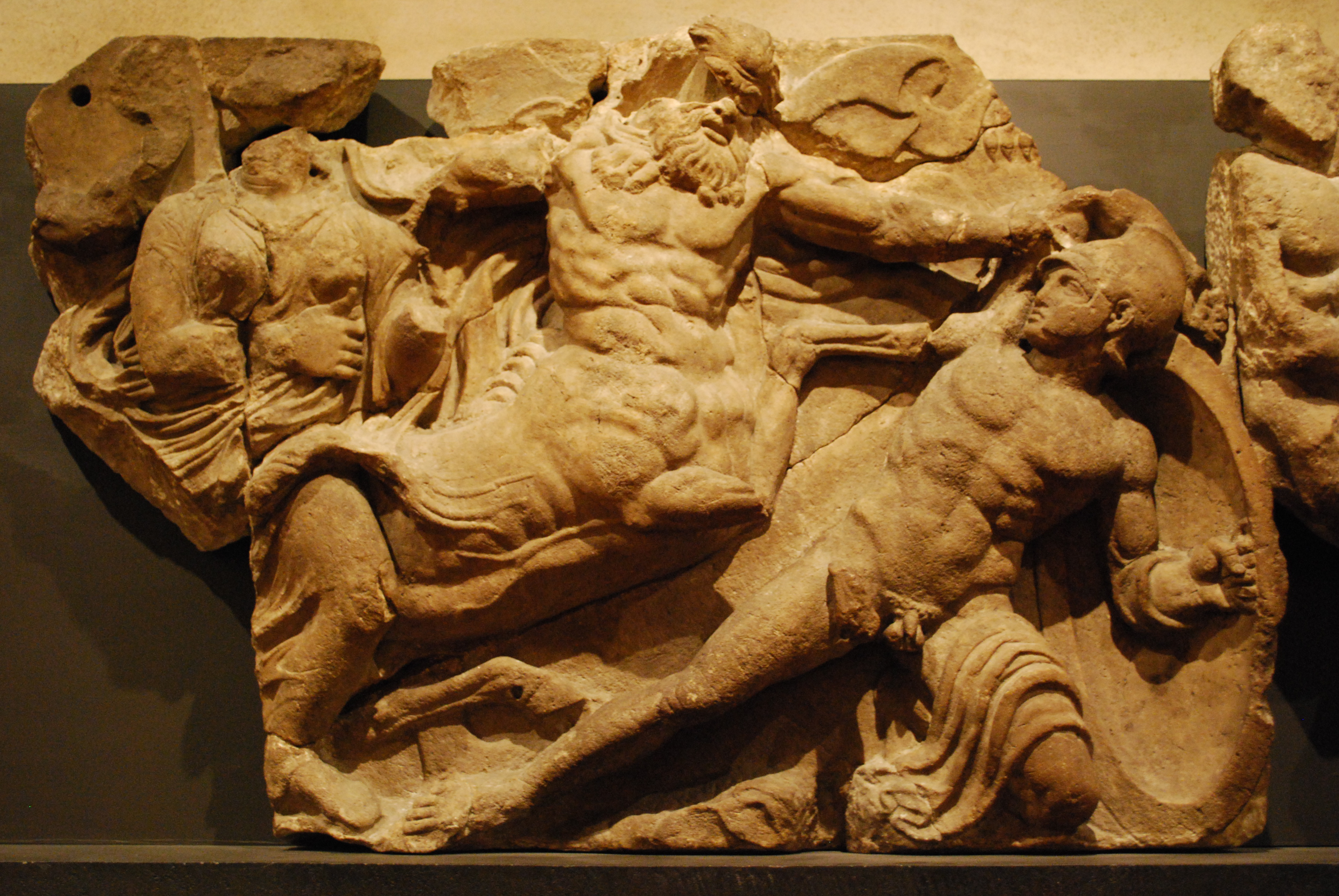
Centaur locked in battle with a Lapith, from the Centauromachy frieze in the temple of Apollo Epikourios at Bassae

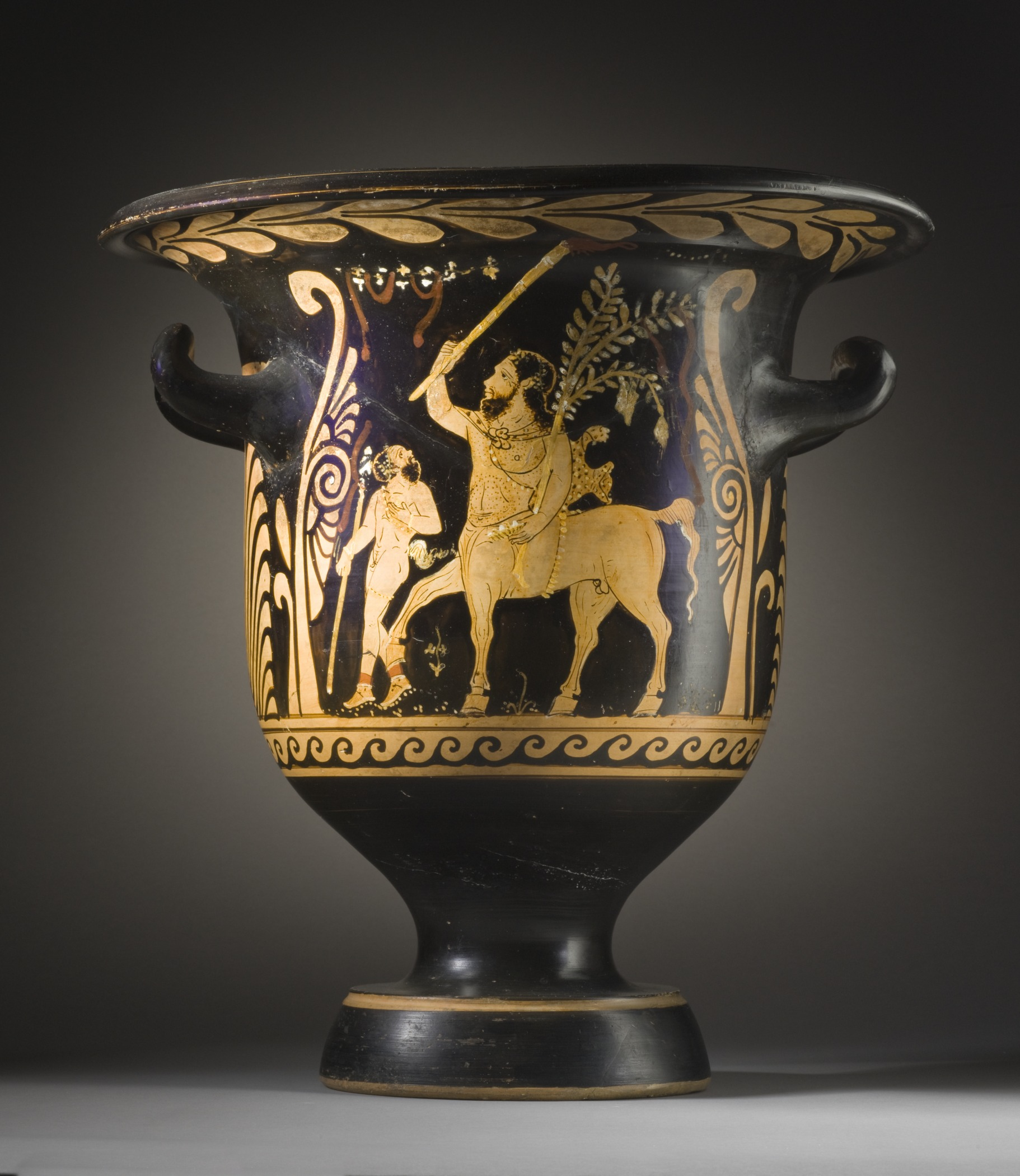
The centaur Chiron on a South Italian bell-krater, c. 350–325 BC

- Abas, attended Pirithous' wedding, fought against the Lapiths and fled.
- Agrius, repelled by Heracles in a fight.
- Amphion, tried to plunder Pholus of his wine and was killed by Heracles.
- Amycus, son of Ophion. He attended Pirithous' wedding and fought against the Lapiths. Amycus was killed by Pelates.
- Anchius, repelled by Heracles when he tried to steal the wine of Pholus.
- Antimachus, attended Pirithous' wedding, fought in the battle against the Lapiths and was killed by Caeneus.
- Aphareus, killed by Theseus in the fight at Pirithous' wedding.
- Aphidas, killed by Phorbas in the fight at Pirithous' wedding.
- Arctus, attended Pirithous' wedding and fought against the Lapiths.
- Areos, attended Pirithous' wedding and fought against the Lapiths.
- Argius, killed by Heracles when he tried to steal the wine of Pholus.
- Asbolus, an augur who had attempted in vain to dissuade his friends from engaging in battle against the Lapiths at Pirithous' wedding.
- Astylus, a seer among the centaurs who tried to warn them from fighting against the Lapiths.
- Bienor, attended Pirithous' wedding, fought in the battle against the Lapiths and was killed by Theseus.
- Bromus, attended Pirithous' wedding, fought in the battle against the Lapiths and was killed by Caeneus.
- Chiron, the son of Cronus and Philyra.
- Chromis, attended Pirithous' wedding, fought in the battle against the Lapiths and was killed by Pirithous.
- Chthonius, attended Pirithous' wedding, fought in the battle against the Lapiths and was killed by Nestor.
- Clanis, attended Pirithous' wedding, fought in the battle against the Lapiths and was killed by Peleus.
- Crenaeus, attended Pirithous' wedding, fought in the battle against the Lapiths and was killed by Dryas.
- Cyllarus, attended Pirithous' wedding, fought in the battle against the Lapiths. Killed by a javelin thrown from an unknown hand. He was married to Hylonome.
- Daphnis, tried to plunder Pholus of his wine and was killed by Heracles.
- Demoleon, attended Pirithous' wedding, fought in the battle against the Lapiths and was killed by Peleus.
- Dictys, attended Pirithous' wedding, fought in the battle against the Lapiths and was killed by Pirithous.
- Dorylas, attended Pirithous' wedding, fought in the battle against the Lapiths and was killed by Peleus.
- Doupon, tried to plunder Pholus of his wine and was killed by Heracles.
- Dryalus, son of Peuceus who attended Pirithous' wedding and fought against the Lapiths.
- Echeclus, attended Pirithous' wedding, fought in the battle against the Lapiths and was killed by Ampyx.
- Elatus, tried to plunder Pholus of his wine. Heracles shot an arrow at him, which, passing through his arm, stuck in the knee of Chiron.
- Elymus, attended Pirithous' wedding, fought in the battle against the Lapiths and was killed by Caeneus.
- Eurynomus, fought against the Lapiths at Pirithous' wedding. Killed by Dryas.
- Eurytion, acted in an insulting manner towards Hippolyte when she was being joined in marriage to Azan in the house of Pirithous. He was killed by Heracles.
- Eurytus, the wildest of the wild Centaurs. He started the fight at Pirithous' wedding and was killed by Theseus.
- Gryneus, fought against the Lapiths at Pirithous' wedding and was killed by Exadius.
- Helops, attended Pirithous' wedding and fought in the battle against the Lapiths. While fleeing from Pirithous, he fell from a precipice into the top of a tree and impaled his body.
- Hippasus, fought against the Lapiths at Pirithous' wedding. Killed by Theseus.
- Hippotion, another Centaur, killed by Heracles when he tried to steal the wine of Pholus.
- Hodites, fought against the Lapiths at Pirithous' wedding. Killed by Mopsus.
- Homadus, tried to plunder Pholus of his wine. Some time after he attempted to rape Alcyone, a granddaughter of Perseus. He got killed in Arcadia.
- Hylaeus, tried to rape Atalanta but was shot by her (same thing happened to Rhoecus).
- Hylaeus, killed by Heracles under unknown circumstances.
- Hylaeus, followed Dionysus in his Indian campaign and was killed by Orontes, an Indian General.
- Hyles, attended Pirithous' wedding, fought in the battle against the Lapiths and was killed by Peleus.
- Hylonome, attended Pirithous' wedding together with her lover Cyllarus. Having seen the latter dead, she threw herself upon the spear which had killed him.
- Imbreus, fought against the Lapiths at Pirithous' wedding and was killed by Dryas.
- Iphinous, fought against the Lapiths at Pirithous' wedding and was killed by Peleus.
- Isoples, killed by Heracles when he tried to steal the wine of Pholus.
- Latreus, fought against the Lapiths at Pirithous' wedding and was killed by Caeneus.
- Lycabas, attended Pirithous' wedding, fought against the Lapiths and fled.
- Lycidas, fought against the Lapiths at Pirithous' wedding and was killed by Dryas.
- Lycopes, fought against the Lapiths at Pirithous' wedding and was killed by Theseus.
- Lycus, fought against the Lapiths at Pirithous' wedding was killed by Pirithous.
- Medon, attended Pirithous' wedding, fought against the Lapiths and fled.
- Melanchaetes, killed by Heracles when he tried to steal the wine of Pholus.
- Melaneus, attended Pirithous' wedding, fought against the Lapiths and fled.
- Mermerus, wounded by the Lapiths at Pirithous' wedding and fled.
- Mimas, attended Pirithous' wedding and fought against the Lapiths.
- Monychus, attended Pirithous' wedding and fought in the battle against the Lapiths. He was conquered by Nestor, mounted on his unwilling back.
- Nedymnus, fought against the Lapiths at Pirithous' wedding. Killed by Theseus.
- Nessus, fled during the fight with the Lapiths at Pirithous' wedding. Later he attempted to rape Deianira and before dying gave her a charm which resulted in the death of Heracles. He was killed by the latter.
- Ophion, father of Amycus.
- Oreius, killed by Heracles when he tried to steal the wine of Pholus.
- Orneus, attended Pirithous' wedding fought against the Lapiths and fled.
- Perimedes, son of Peuceus and attended Pirithous' wedding and fought against the Lapiths.
- Petraeus, fought against the Lapiths at Pirithous' wedding and was killed by Pirithous.
- Peuceus, father of Perimedes and Dryalus.
- Phaecomes, fought against the Lapiths at Pirithous' wedding and was killed by Nestor.
- Phlegraeus, fought against the Lapiths at Pirithous' wedding and was killed by Peleus.
- Pholus
- Phrixus, killed by Heracles when he tried to steal the wine of Pholus.
- Pisenor, attended Pirithous' wedding, fought against the Lapiths and fled.
- Pylenor, having been wounded by Heracles washed himself in the river Anigrus, thus providing the river with a peculiar odor.
- Pyracmus, fought against the Lapiths at Pirithous' wedding and was killed by Caeneus.
- Pyraethus, fought against the Lapiths at Pirithous' wedding and was killed by Periphas.
- Rhoecus, He also tried to rape Atalanta and was killed by her.
- Rhoetus, fought against the Lapiths at Pirithous' wedding and was killed by Dryas.
- Ripheus, fought against the Lapiths at Pirithous' wedding and was killed by Theseus.
- Styphelus, fought against the Lapiths at Pirithous' wedding and was killed by Caeneus.
- Teleboas, fought against the Lapiths at Pirithous' wedding and was killed by Nestor.
- Thaumas, attended Pirithous' wedding, fought against the Lapiths and fled.
- Thereus, this Centaur used to catch bears and carry them home alive and struggling. Attended Pirithous' wedding and fought in the battle against the Lapiths. Killed by Theseus.
- Thereus, killed by Heracles when he tried to steal the wine of Pholus.
- Ureus, attended Pirithous' wedding and fought against the Lapiths.
