= Ureus =

Mythical Greek centaur

In Greek mythology, Ureus (Ancient Greek: Οὔρειόν means ‘fortress’) was a centaur who attended Pirithous’ and Hippodameia’s wedding. Together with his kin, they fought against the Lapiths during the celebrated Centauromachy.

== Mythology ==
Ureus was briefly mentioned by Hesiod, describing the shield of Heracles:

“And there was the strife of the Lapith spearmen gathered round the prince Caeneus and Dryas and Peirithöus, with Hopleus, Exadius, Phalereus, and Prolochus, Mopsus the son of Ampyce of Titaresia, a scion of Ares, and Theseus, the son of Aegeus, like unto the deathless gods. These were of silver, and had armour of gold upon their bodies. And the Centaurs were gathered against them on the other side with Petraeus and Asbolus the diviner, Arctus, and Ureus, and black-haired Mimas, and the two sons of Peuceus, Perimedes and Dryalus: these were of silver, and they had pinetrees of gold in their hands, and they were rushing together as though they were alive and striking at one another hand to hand with spears and with pines."
