= Antianeira =

Antianeira (Ancient Greek: Ἀντιάνειρα, lit. 'a match for men') was the name of a number of women in Greek mythology:

- Antianeira, possibly mother of the Argonaut Idmon by the god Apollo.
- Antianeira, mother of the Argonauts Eurytus and Echion.
- Antianeira, also spelled Antianara, an Amazon who succeeded Penthesilea as Queen of the Amazons. In some version of the myth, she was killed during the Trojan War fighting for the latter.
