= Bromus (mythology) =

Centaur in Greek mythology

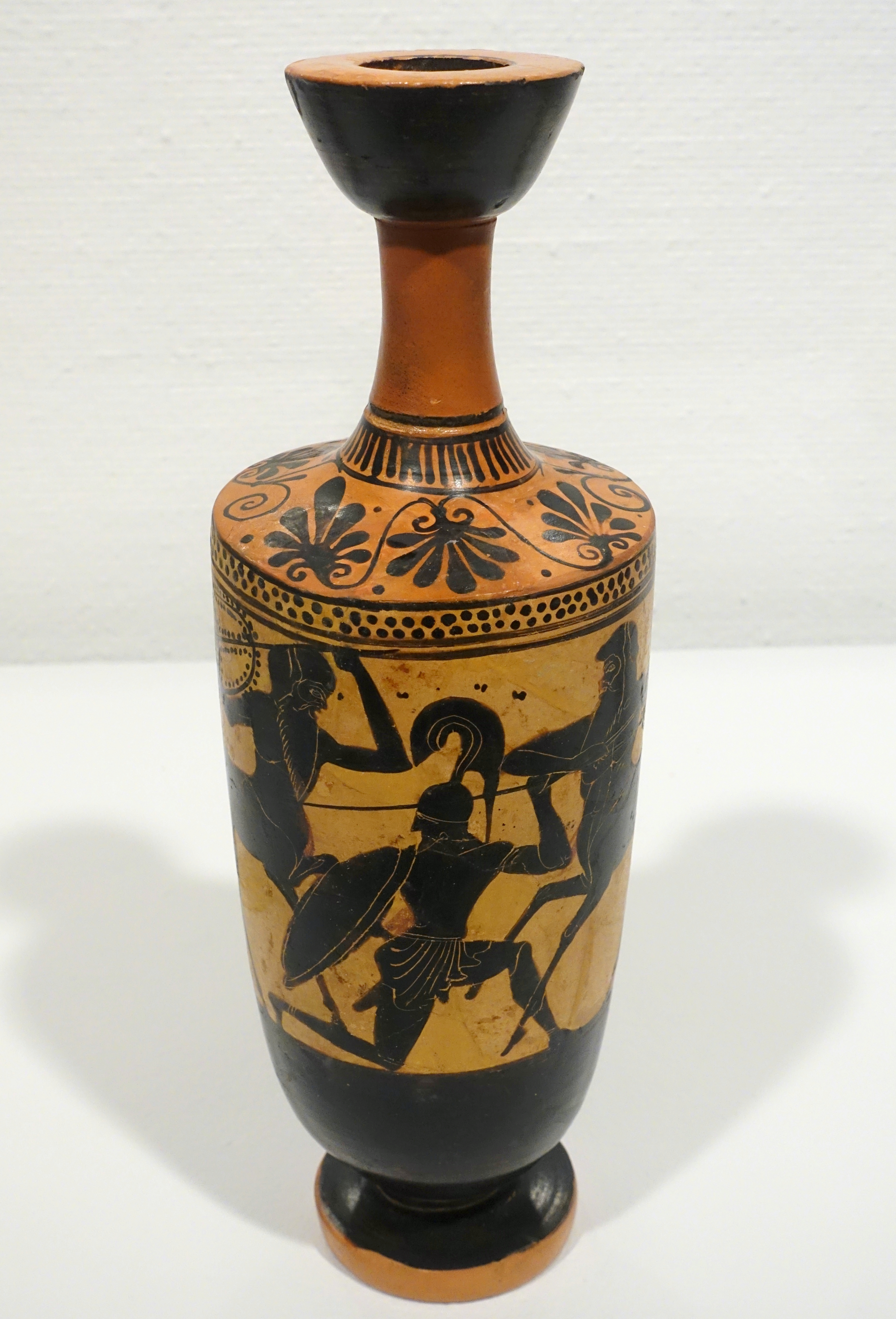
A vase depicting two centaurs in combat with Kaineus

In Greek mythology, Bromus or Bromos (Ancient Greek: Βρομος means ‘roaring, shouting’) was one of the centaurs who attended Pirithous's and Hippodameia's wedding and fought against the Lapiths during the celebrated Centauromachy. Together with four other centaurs, Styphelus, Antimachus, Elymus, and Pyracmos, they were all slain by Caeneus.
