= Celadon (mythology) =

In Greek mythology, Celadon (/ˈsɛlədɒn/; Ancient Greek: Κέλαδον) may refer to three distinct characters:

- Celadon, one of the Ethiopian chiefs who was a Mendesian present in the court of Cepheus at the moment of the fight between Phineus and Perseus. As an adversary of Perseus, he was killed by the latter.
- Celadon, one of the Lapiths who attended the wedding of their King Pirithous and Hippodamia. During the fight caused by the centaurs' attempt to rape the bride, he was killed by the centaur Amycus with a chandelier from a shrine according to a scholiast on Dionysius Periegetes.
- Celadon, son of Miletus and Doie, and the sibling of Kaunos and Byblis.
