= Cymelus =

Lapith in Greek mythology

In Greek mythology, Cymelus or Kymelos was one of the Lapiths who attended the wedding of their king Pirithous and his bride Hippodamia.

== Mythology ==
During the celebrated battle between the centaurs and the Lapiths, Cymelus was killed by the centaur Nessus after the latter hurled a spear at him which struck his groin.
