= Pelates (mythology) =

Figures in Greek mythology

In Greek mythology, Pelates may refer to two distinct people:

- Pelates, one of the Ethiopian chiefs who was a Cinyphian in the court of King Cepheus of Ethiopia at the moment of the fight between Phineus and Perseus. After being pinned to a wooden post by the spear of Corythus (son of Marmarus), he was killed by Perseus’ friend Abas who pierced his side while struggling. Eventually, Pelates died while suspended with his hand on the door-post.
- Pelates, a Lapith from Pella in Macedonia who attended the nuptial of their king Pirithous and his bride Hippodamia. He participated in the celebrated Centauromachy, the battle between the Lapiths and the centaurs, where he slayed the centaur Amycus, son of Ophion, using a table-leg of maple wood.
