= Idmon (Argonaut) =

Greek mythological figure

In Greek mythology, Idmon (Ancient Greek: Ἴδμων) was an Argonaut seer.

== Family ==
Allegedly a son of Apollo, he had Abas (or Ampycus) as his mortal father. His mother was Asteria, daughter of Coronus, or Cyrene, or else Antianeira, daughter of Pheres. By Laothoe, he had a son Thestor.

Comparative table of Idmon's family
Relation	Names	Sources				
Relation	Names	Pherecydes	Apollonius	Hyginus	Orphic	Schol. ad Apollon.
Parentage	Apollo and Asteria	✓				✓
Parentage	Apollo		✓			
Parentage	Abas		✓			
Parentage	Apollo and Cyrene			✓		
Parentage	Abas and Cyrene			✓		
Parentage	Apollo and Antianeira				✓	
Spouse	Laothoe					✓
Offspring	Thestor					✓

== Mythology ==
Idmon foresaw his own death in the Argonaut expedition, but joined anyway. During the outbound voyage of Argo, a boar killed him in the land of the Mariandyni, in Bithynia.

In 559 BC, the citizens of Megara Heraclea (today's Eregli) built a temple over Idmon's grave.
