= Styphelus =

In Greek mythology, Styphelus or Styphelos (Ancient Greek: Στυφελος means ‘rough, cruel’) was one of the centaurs who attended Pirithous’ and Hippodameia's wedding and fought against the Lapiths during the celebrated Centauromachy. Together with four other centaurs, Bromus, Antimachus, Elymus, and Pyracmos, they were all slain by Caeneus.
