= Charaxus =

Greek mythological character

In Greek mythology, Charaxus (Ancient Greek: Χάραξος) was one of the Lapiths who attended the wedding of their king Pirithous and Hippodamia.

== Mythology ==
During the fight caused by the centaurs' attempt to rape the bride, Charaxus was killed by the centaur Rhoetus but the former accidentally slain his friend Cometes instead. This was recounted in the following excerpt:

'Then Rhoetus snatched a blazing brand of plum-wood from an altar and whirling it upon the right, smashed through the temples of Charaxus, wonderful with golden hair. Seized by the violent flames, his yellow locks burned fiercely, as a field of autumn grain; and even the scorching blood gave from the sore wound a terrific noise as a red-hot iron in pincers which the smith lifts out and plunges in the tepid pool, hissing and sizzling. Charaxus shook the fire from his burnt locks; and heaved up on his shoulders a large threshold stone torn from the ground — a weight sufficient for a team of oxen. The vast weight impeded him, so that it could not even touch his foe — and yet, the massive stone did hit his friend, Cometes, who was standing near to him, and crushed him down. Then Rhoetus, crazed with joy, exulting yelled, 'I pray that all of you may be so strong!' Wielding his half-burnt stake with heavy blows again and again, he broke the sutures of his enemy's skull, until the bones were mingled with his oozing brains.

— Ovid, Metamorphoses, 12.271-289
