= Cometes =

Several figures in Greek mythology

Cometes (Ancient Greek: Κομήτης) may refer to the following figures in Greek mythology:

- Cometes, son of Thestius and brother of Prothous and Althaea.
- Cometes, the Peirasian father of Asterius, one of the Argonauts. His wife could be Antigona, daughter of Pheres, who was called mother of the said hero.
- Cometes_{,} one of the Lapiths attending Pirithous' wedding. He was killed by Charaxus, his friend, accidentally.
- Cometes, was the lover of Aegialia, wife of Diomedes, when the latter was fighting at Troy. Cometes was son of Sthenelus, son of Capaneus, son of Hipponous.
- Cometes, was the first among the sons of Tisamenus to sail to Asia. It was under the reign of Tisamenus, son of Orestes, that the Heraclidae returned to the Peloponnesus.
