= Nireus (disambiguation) =

Nireus is a name that may refer to:

- Nireus (Νιρεύς), in Greek mythology:
  - Nireus, king of Syme
  - Nireus, a son of Poseidon and Canace
  - Nireus, a companion of Heracles
- 173086 Nireus, an asteroid
- Nireus, a Type 209 submarine of the Hellenic Navy
- Papilio nireus, a species of butterfly
