= Hodites =

Name in Greek mythology

In Greek mythology, the name Hodites (Ancient Greek: Ὁδίτην ) may refer to:

- Hodites, a Centaur at the wedding of Pirithous and Hippodamia, killed by Mopsus.
- Hodites, killed by Clymenus during the battle between Perseus and Phineus.
- Hodites, the name used by Diodorus Siculus for one of the sons of Heracles and Deianeira instead of "Oneites".
