= Gryneus =

In Greek mythology, Gryneus (Ancient Greek: Γρύνειος or Γρυνεύς, romanized: Gryneios, lit. 'of Gryneion' or 'from Grynium') may refer to the following:

- Gryneus, an epithet of Apollo, under which he had a temple, an ancient oracle, and a beautiful grove near the town of Grynion, Gryna, or Grynus in Aeolis in Asia Minor. Under the similar, if not the same name, Γρυνεύς, Apollo was worshiped in the Hecatonnesi.
- Gryneus, a centaur who killed Broteas, and Orios, son of Mycale. He himself was slain by Exadius, a Lapith, at the battle of the Lapiths and the centaurs at Pirithous' wedding.
