= Broteas (mythology) =

In Greek mythology, Broteas (Ancient Greek: Βροτέας, lit. 'mortal' or 'man') may refer to the following characters:

- Broteas, a hunter who affirmed that not even fire could hurt him; he died when he, going mad, threw himself into fire.
- Broteas, son of Tantalus. He may be the same as the above figure.
- Broteas, a famous boxer who was counted among the Ethiopian chiefs who were in the court of Cepheus, father of Andromeda, when the battle between Phineus and Perseus broke up. He and his twin brother Ammon were killed by Phineus.
- Broteas, one of the Lapiths who fought against the centaurs at Pirithous' wedding. He was slain by the Centaur Gryneus.
- Broteas, father of Tantalus, who had been married to Clytemnestra before Agamemnon. The common account, however, is, that Thyestes was the father of this Tantalus.

A Hesiodic papyrus fragment from Oxyrhyncus connects Dardanus, Broteas and Pandion, in a tradition of which there is no further evidence.
