= Areus =

Areus may refer to:

- Areus I, king of Sparta from 309 to 265 BC, son of prince Acrotatus, grandson of Cleomenes II
- Areus II, king of Sparta from 262 to 254 BC, son of king Acrotatus, grandson of Areus I; he died in infancy
- Areus (mythology), a minor figure in Peloponnesian mythology, son of Ampyx, father of Agenor
