= The Abduction of Hippodameia =

Sculpture by Albert-Ernest Carrier-Belleuse

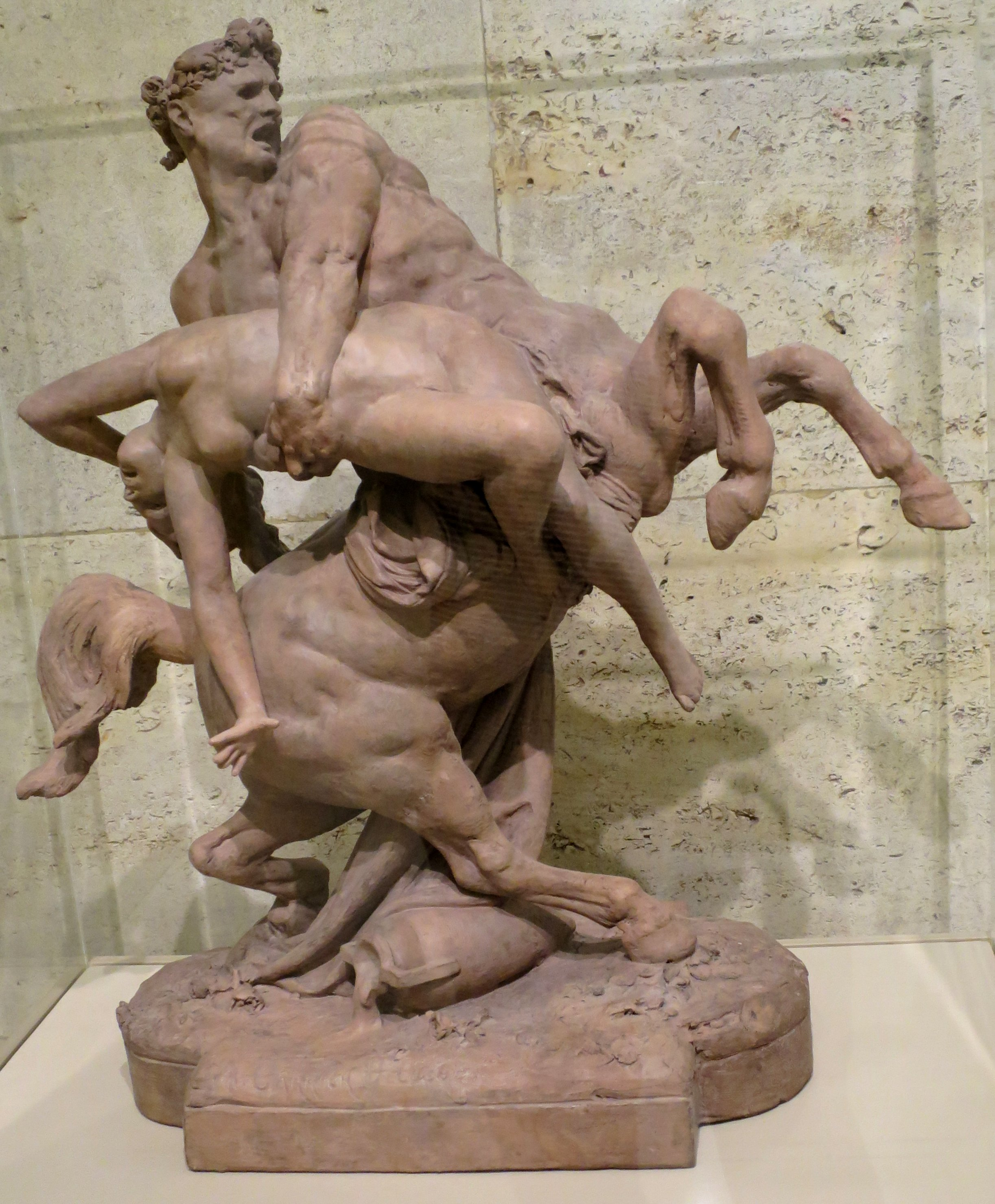
The Abduction of Hippodamia, c. 1877. The terra cotta sculpture appeared at the Columbus Museum of Art in 2006.

The Abduction of Hippodamia, (French: L'Enlèvement d'Hippodamie) is a work by the 19th-century French sculptor Albert-Ernest Carrier-Belleuse, modeled c. 1877 and cast thereafter.

The subject is from Greek mythology: During the wedding of Hippodamia and Pirithous, the barbaric centaurs who had been invited became wildly intoxicated, attacking the other guests and even the hosts. The centaur Eurytus attempted to carry off the bride, and a battle between the humans and the centaurs ensued.

An earlier similar work, cast in silver, was commissioned by the Jockey Club to be a trophy at the Bois de Boulogne horse races in 1874. Because the trophy was contracted to be unique, the work was remodeled with slight changes to the positioning of Hippodamia and the forcefulness of the centaur.

The sculpture's theme of struggle between the rational and the bestial, expressed in a mythological setting, was a popular one and not unusual in 19th-century European art. Its execution sets it apart, however, and it is by some considered one of the finest examples of its kind in the late 19th century.

Rodin, who was associated with Carrier-Belleuse's studio in the 1870s, may have contributed to the modeling; while the subject matter and the lines of Hippodamia exemplify Carrier-Belleuse's style, the expression and musculature of the centaur suggest Rodin. However, according to some sources, Rodin may not have been working with Carrier-Belleuse at the time that The Abduction was designed and reworked.
