= Angélique Mongez =

French Neoclassical artist

Marie-Joséphine-Angélique Mongez
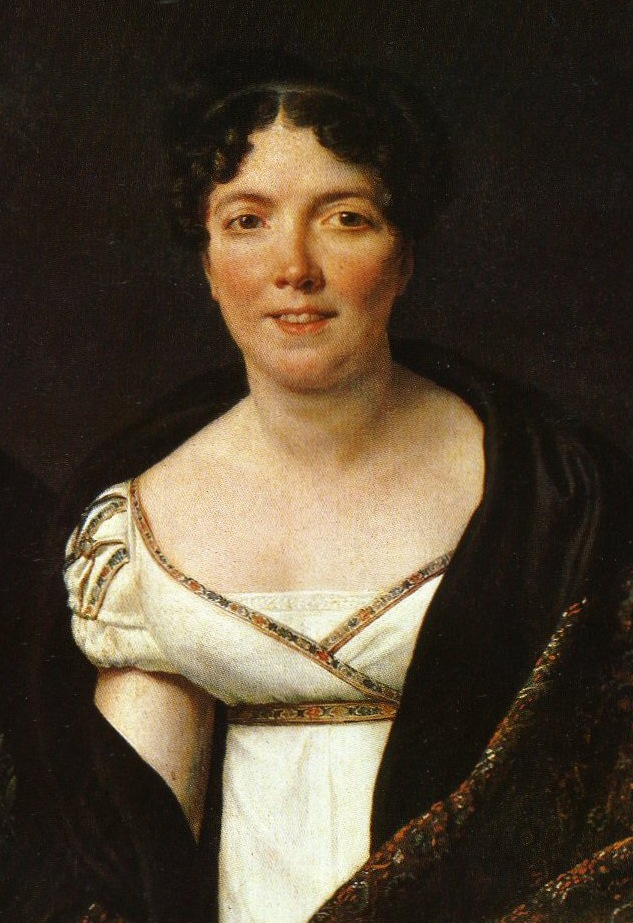
- Detail from Portrait d'Antoine Mongez et de sa femme Angélique by David (1812)
- Born: Marie-Joséphine-Angélique Levol; May 1, 1775; Charenton-le-Pont, France
- Died: February 20, 1855 (aged 79); Paris, France
- Known for: Painting
- Movement: Neoclassicism
- Spouse: Antoine Mongez

Marie-Joséphine-Angélique Mongez, née Levol (1 May 1775 – 20 February 1855) was a French Neoclassical artist. She studied under Jean-Baptiste Regnault and Jacques-Louis David and produced historical paintings. She was the first woman to become a history painter during the post French Revolution era. Mongez started studying under Jean-Baptiste Regnault in the early 1790s and then, after mastering the basics, she became a pupil of Jacques-Louis David, who at the time was one of the leaders of the Neoclassical movement in France. Her work was featured at a number of salons between 1802 and 1827. Some male reviewers criticized her for including depictions of nudity in her work.

== Personal life ==
Marie-Joséphine-Angélique Levol was born on 1 May 1775 in Conflans-l'Archevèque, near Paris, to Marcel-Sulpice Levol and Marie-Louise Papillon. She married Antoine Mongez, a Director of the Mint, classical scholar and naturalist, who was 28 years older than her. He was also an author of books on arithmetic and algebra for women and published several books on ancient culture, including four volumes called Dictionnaire d'Antiquité in 1804, which were illustrated by his wife. His brother was the mineralogist, Jean-André Mongez. They had a son, Irénée-Alexandre, born in 1803 and died in Paris on November 15, 1808. They actually married three times. On 9 June 1792, accompanied by Bon-Joseph Dacier, his colleague at the academy, Lacepede and the Abbe Sieyes, Mongez and Angelique were married in a civil ceremony. When a new law relating to civil status had been enacted, they complied with all that it required, and on 1 July 1793, they again presented themselves before a civil registrar for marriage. Much later, a writ from Pope Pius VII authorized them to marry according to the canons of the Church; which they did on 26 October 1814, in their parish of Saint-Germain-des-Prés.

== Works ==
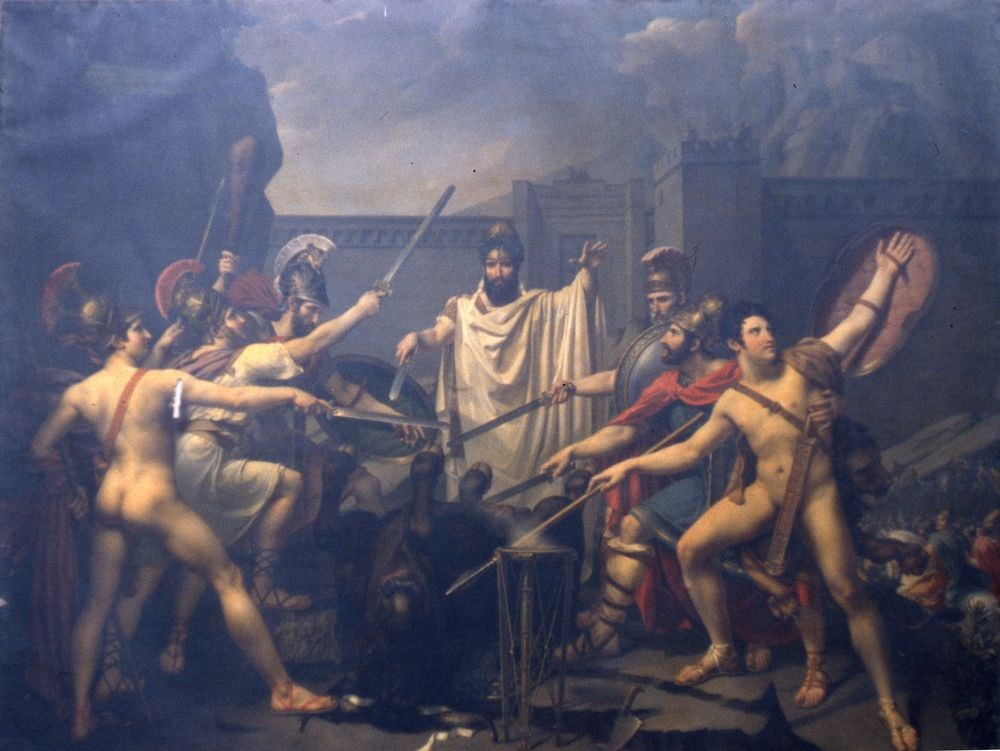
The Seven Against Thebes, Salon of 1827

Mongez established herself as a Neoclassical history painter from the very beginning, and disregarded criticisms related to her femininity. Over the course of her career, she possessed two smaller studios in addition to the one she maintained at the Mint, up until her death.

Mongez’ principal works include her first major painting, Astyanax Snatched from His Mother (1802), Alexander Weeping Over the Death of the Wife of Darius I (1804), Theseus and Pirithous (1806), Orpheus in Hell (1808), The Death of Adonis (1810), Perseus and Andromeda (1812), Mars and Venus (1814), Saint Martin Sharing his Cloak with a Beggar (1819), and her last Salon exhibit The Seven Against Thebes (1827). Her subjects emulated the French academic masters, and were comparable to subjects set for the Prix de Rome competitions, which she could not enter due to her sex. However, her work rivaled if not surpassed the work typically seen in the Prix de Rome. Her paintings contained more dynamic compositions and female nudity, something that her male contemporaries were prohibited from depicting within the confines of the Prix de Rome.

Mongez often included nude figures in most of her works, which was significant for several reasons: her emulation of David's work; a demonstration of her grasp of the most difficult technical aspects of painting; and a confirmation of her understanding of the most modern developments in neoclassical historical painting. However, she received many comments in regards to her inclusion of the male nude in her paintings, despite her married status. Her work was troubling to notions of morality and conceptions of femininity of the time, specifically among sections of the bourgeoisie. Despite this, she received state encouragement and radical class support, as well as patronage from the Russian Prince Youssoupov and Louis XVIII, whose portrait she painted after the Bourbon Restoration. Her connections with David helped her to sell her works to the prince for a grand total of 6000 francs.

=== Selected works ===
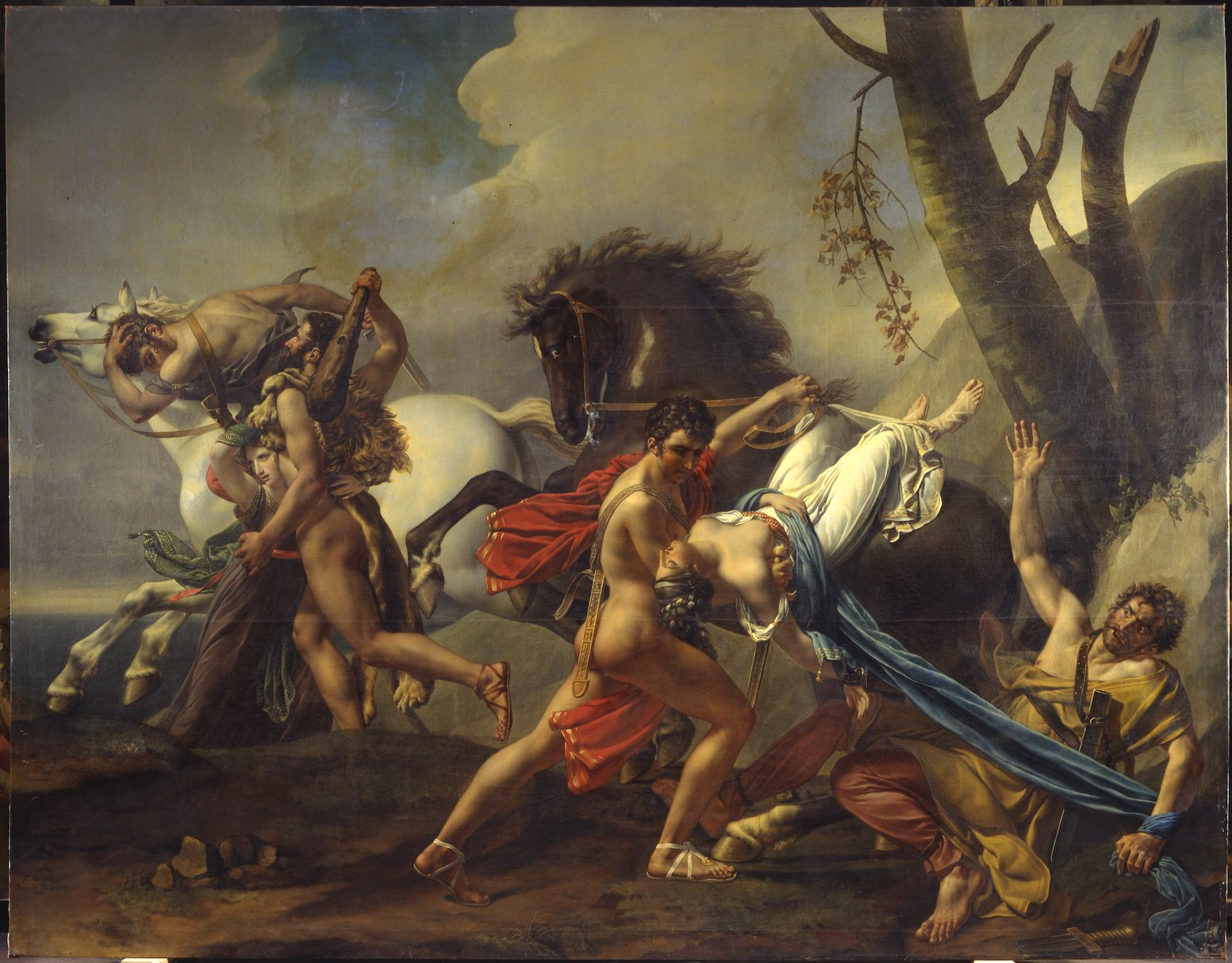
Theseus and Pirithoüs Clearing the Earth of Brigands, Deliver Two Women from the Hands of their Abductors, 1806 (Arkhangelskoye Palace)

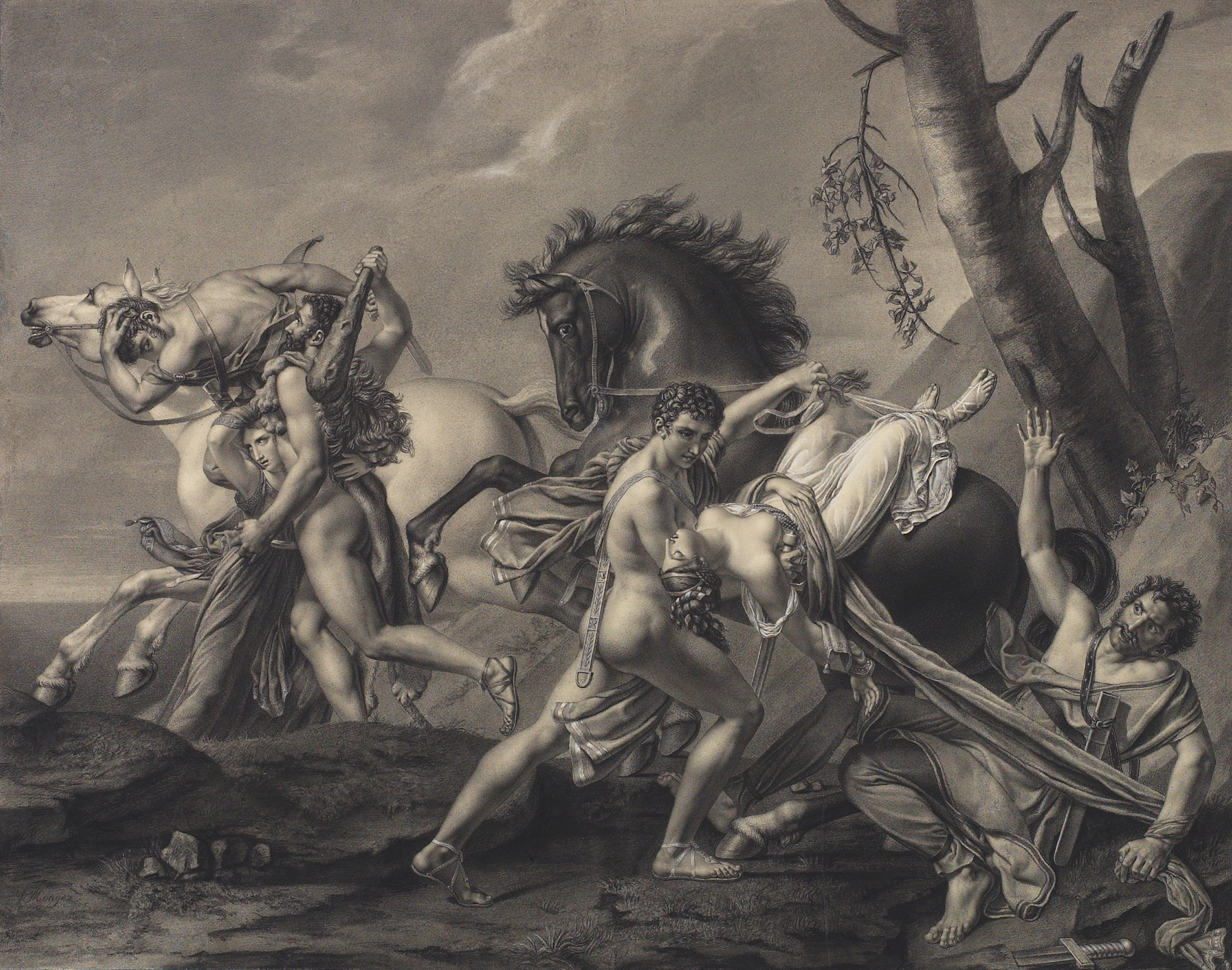
Theseus and Pirithous, drawing, after the painting exhibited at the Salon of 1806

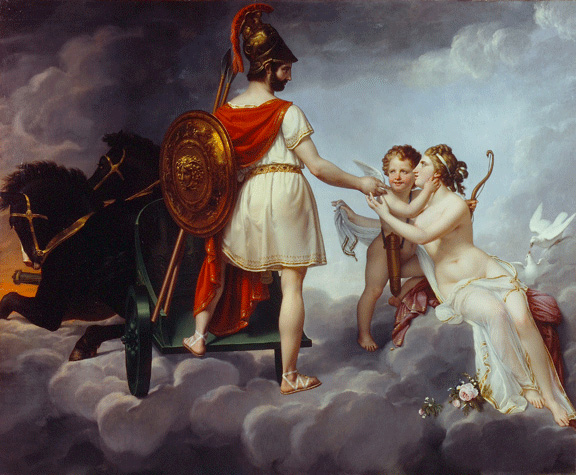
Mars and Venus, 1841 (replica of the painting exhibited at the Salon of 1814)

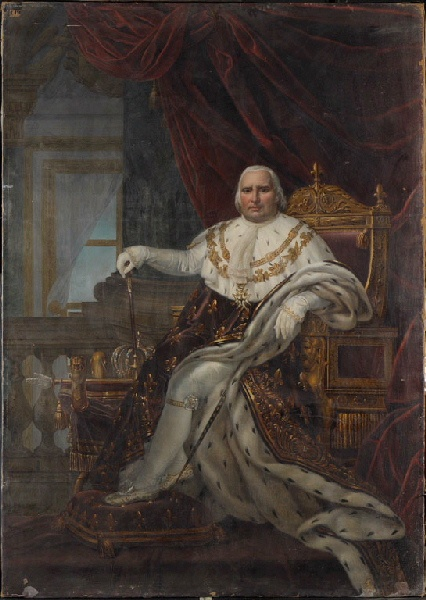
Portrait of Louis XVIII, 1815

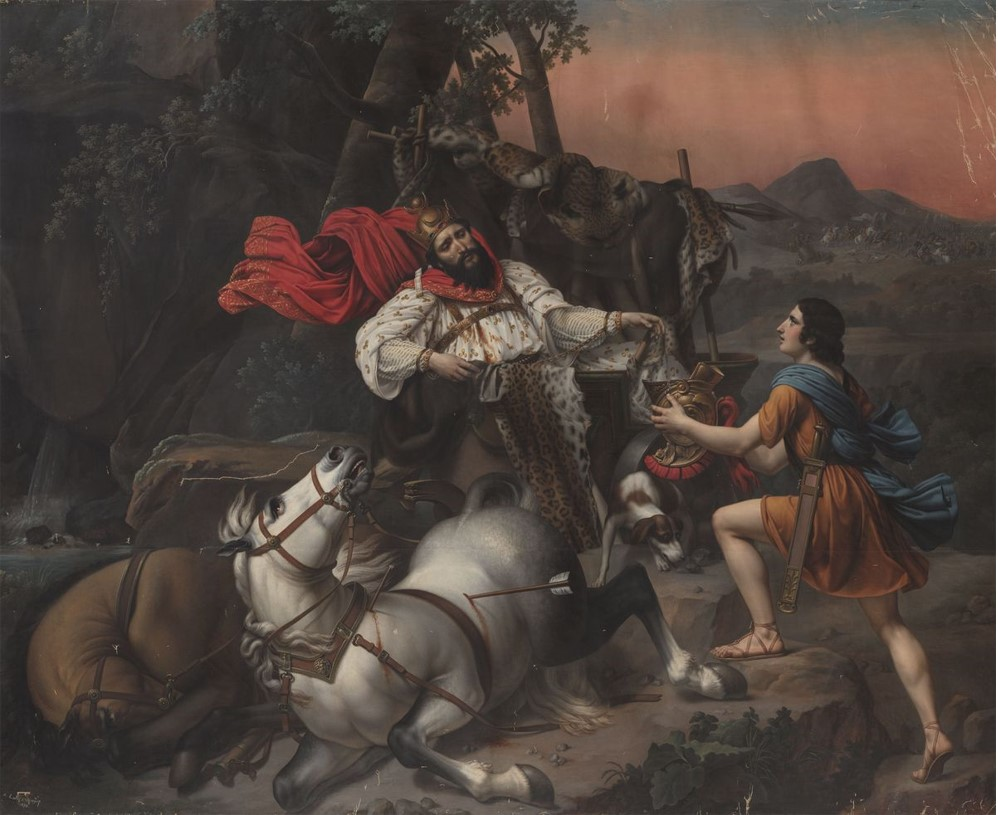
The Death of Darius, 1838

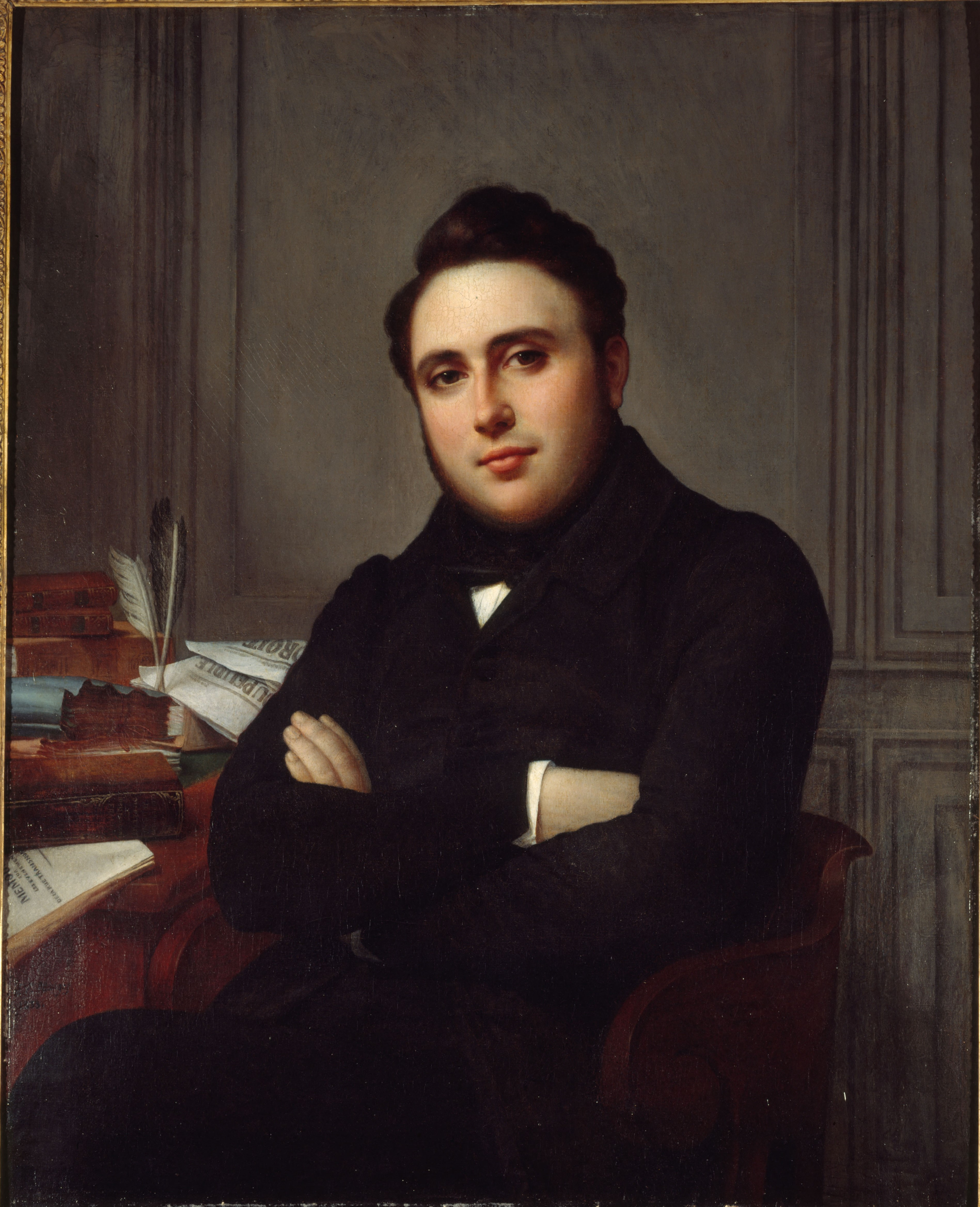
Portrait of Alexandre Ledru-Rollin, 1838

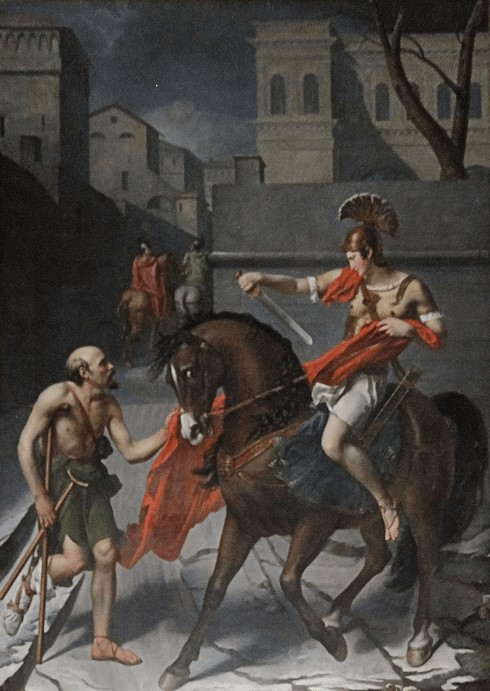
Saint Martin Sharing His Cloak with a Beggar, circa 1841 (copy of the painting exhibited at the Salon of 1819)

== Artistic community ==
Mongez was the pupil of Regnault and David during the 1790s, and was already recognized by the leaders of the Neoclassical movement in France at that time. It was through David that she met Mongez, of whom he was a friend, and Jean-Paul Marat. His paintings were all in the historical genre. They helped persuade Mongez to pursue a similar course as she had long been interested in historical costume and dress. Her husband provided the verification for the accuracy of her paintings. In return, she illustrated 380 figures in the Dictionnaire d'Antiquité, of which her husband composed the text.

Angélique Mongez exhibited at the Salon for the first time in the Salon of 1802 and continued until 1827. At the Salon of 1804, she received the first-class gold medal and received another in 1827. She was the first woman to exhibit a large-scale storyboard at the Salon. Astyanax Snatched From His Mother, a picture which she exhibited at the Salon of 1802 provoked much debate among the critics. For Le Journal des Arts, the painting was one of the finest works of the modern school; yet other critics attributed the most beautiful parts to David. Jean-Baptiste Boutard, of the Journal des Débats, wrote: "It is quite agreed that this painting is, in more than one part, a masterpiece."

At the following Salon (1804), Angelique Mongez exhibited another great figure of history: Alexander Weeping Over the Death of the Wife of Darius I, for which she received a gold medal. In 1806 she exhibited Theseus and Pirithous, a large painting that was purchased by Prince Youssoupoff, a great collector of French Neoclassical paintings. The canvas was openly criticized for the nakedness of the two characters. Femininity and history painting were then judged incompatible; the modesty of women demanded it. Several critics even thought that Mongez should stop painting historical subjects and devote herself exclusively to themes more appropriate to her sex, which she refused to do.

Under the Restoration she made a portrait of Louis XVIII. In 1827, the critic Étienne-Jean Delécluze wrote of her The Seven Against Thebes (now in Musée des Beaux-Arts d'Angers): "Madame Mongez imitated David. The Romulus of the Sabines reappears there in all its nakedness." Stéphanie Dermoncourt of the Museum of Fine Arts of Lyon says that her figure of Polystratus carrying water to Darius is very similar to the Oedipus of Ingres. Later, this art historian indicates, "…the style of Madame Mongez seems to have evolved towards the art of Ingres".

She never gave up history painting and created, a year before her death, a Christ on the Cross (1854) for the church of Saint Peter in Charenton.

== Death and legacy ==
Mongez died in Paris on 20 February 1855.

She has received renewed attention since the late 1990s. She appears in several articles and books devoted to women painters of the Post-Revolutionary period. Several authors have examined the conditions that allowed her to become a history painter, despite the conventions of the time.
