= Amycus (centaur) =

Centaur in Greek mythology

In Greek mythology, Amycus or Amykos (Ancient Greek: Ἄμυκος) was a male centaur and the son of Ophion.

== Mythology ==
There is not much known about Amycus, but he is said to have been involved in the Centauromachy, a battle between the centaurs and the Lapith people; this battle is what the centaurs are best known for. The battle took place during the wedding of the King of the Lapithae, Pirithous, and his wife Hippodamia.

Amycus's involvement in this battle is recognized in the Metamorphoses, written by the Roman poet Ovid. In this work, it is noted that Amycus, along with many other centaurs, was invited to and attended the wedding that turned into a bloody battle. The centaurs become drunk on wine and attempted to take Hippodamia, along with other Lapith women, as they pleased. Eurytus, a centaur, could not control himself when the bride, Hippodamia, was presented; he attempted to kidnap and rape her. He inspired all the drunken centaurs to attack and violate the Lapith women. Theseus, a friend of Pirithous, stopped the centaur Eurytus, ultimately killing him resulting in the first blood of the battle. Amycus's role in this battle is of great importance; he was responsible for the first death of one of the Lapith people. Driven with anger due to the death of the loved centaur Eurytus, Amycus smashed the head of innocent Lapith Celadon with a candlestick. Pelates from Pella clubbed him to death using a leg from a maple table, sending Amycus down to the underworld Tartarus. These were the first deaths of the battle between the centaurs and the Lapith people. The Lapiths ultimately defeated the centaurs and drove them from Thessaly to the northwest.

The Centauromachy is a well known legend. Two of the most famously portrayed artworks are in the Parthenon metopes by Phidias and in a Renaissance-era sculpture by Michelangelo.

== Namesake ==
55576 Amycus is a minor planet named after Amycus the centaur.
