= Atrax (mythology) =

Greek Mythological figure & eponym of Atrax (Ancient Greek city)

In Greek mythology, Atrax /ˈeɪtræks/ (Ancient Greek: Ἄτραξ) was believed to have been the founder and eponym of Atrax or Atracia, a city in ancient Thessaly.

== Family ==
Atrax was the son of the river god Peneus and Bura. He had three daughters: Hippodamia, wife of Pirithous; Caenis, who transformed into a male, Caeneus; and Damasippe, who was married to Cassandrus of Thrace.

== Mythology ==
Damasippe fell in love with her stepson Hebrus (Cassandrus' son by his first wife Crotonice); as he rejected all her advances, she took revenge on him by falsely accusing him of seducing her; Cassandrus believed the accusations and tried to kill Hebrus, who threw himself into the river Rhombus, which was subsequently renamed Hebrus.
