= Demoleon (mythology) =

Name of three characters in Greek myths

In Greek mythology, Demoleon (Ancient Greek: Δημολέων) may refer to the following characters:

- Demoleon, one of the centaurs who attended Pirithous's wedding and fought in the battle against the Lapiths. He was killed by Peleus.
- Demoleon, the Laconian son of Hippasus who came to Troy with their king Menelaus. During the Trojan War, he was slain by the hero-prince Paris.
- Demoleon, a Trojan warrior, son of Antenor and Theano. He was killed by Achilles.
- Demoleon, one of the sacrificial victims of the Minotaur.
