= Aregonis =

Ancient Greek mythological figure

Aregonis (Ancient Greek: Ἀρηγονίς) is a character in Greek mythology. According to the Orphic Argonautica, she was the wife of the seer Ampyx, himself a descendant (in some sources) of Ares, and mother of Mopsus, another seer. According to the Fabulae, she was called "Chloris".

In certain telegraph codes, "Aregonis" signified "powerful".

== Notes ==
- Gaius Julius Hyginus, Fabulae from The Myths of Hyginus translated and edited by Mary Grant. University of Kansas Publications in Humanistic Studies. Online version at the Topos Text Project.
- The Orphic Argonautica, translated by Jason Colavito. © Copyright 2011. Online version at the Topos Text Project.
