= Titaron =

Town in ancient Thessaly

Titaron (Ancient Greek: Τιταρών) was a town in ancient Thessaly. It is unlocated.
