= Ampyx =

Name of multiple Greek mythological figures

In Greek mythology, Ampyx (Ancient Greek: Ἄμπυξ) or Ampycus (Ἄμπυκος Ampykos, 'woman's diadem, frontlet') was the name of the following figures:

- Ampyx, also called Ampycus or Ampyce was a Titaresian seer, the son of Elatus or Titairon, eponymous founder of the town of Titaron. He fathered Mopsus with the nymph Chloris (daughter of Orchomenus) or Aregonis. His son Mopsus joined the Argonauts after he was slain.
- Ampyx, father of the seer Idmon in some texts. Otherwise, Idmon was called the son of Abas or the god Apollo by Antianeira. Not to be confused with the above-mentioned Ampyx who was the father of another seer, Mopsus.
- Ampyx or Ampycus, an Ethiopian priest of Demeter (Ceres). He appears in Ovid's Metamorphoses and was slain by Phineus during a fight between Phineus and Perseus (see Boast of Cassiopeia), just before Phineus was turned to stone.
- In Ovid's Metamorphoses, Ampyx was one of the Lapiths who fought the centaurs at Pirithous's wedding. He killed a centaur named Echetlos.
- Ampyx, son of Pelias, descendant of King Amyclas of Laconia. Through his son Areus, Ampyx became the ancestor of Patreus who founded Patrae.
