= Nireus (mythology) =

In Greek mythology, Nireus (Ancient Greek: Νιρεύς, romanized: Nireús) may refer to the following personages:

- Nireus, a Thessalian prince as the son of Poseidon and princess Canace, daughter of King Aeolus of Aeolia. He was the brother of Hopleus, Epopeus, Aloeus and Triops.
- Nireus, king of Syme
