= Areus (mythology) =

In Greek mythology, Areus or Areos (Ancient Greek: Ἀρέως means 'the spring of Ares') was a son of Ampyx, descendant of King Amyclas of Laconia. Through his son Agenor, Areus was the ancestor of Patreus who founded Patras.
