= Prolochus (mythology) =

In Greek mythology, Prolochus (Ancient Greek: Πρόλοχόν) was one of the Lapiths who attended the nuptial of their king Pirithous and Hippodamia. He fought in the celebrated Centauromachy, the battle that erupted between the Lapiths and the centaurs after the latter attempted to rape the bride of the Lapith ruler.
