= Abas (mythology) =

Greek mythological figures sharing the same name

In Greek mythology, the name Abas (/ă'-bas/; Ancient Greek: Ἄβας; gen.: Ἄβαντος, lit. 'guileless' or 'good-hearted') is attributed to several individuals:

- Abas, king of Argos.
- Abas, son of Poseidon and Arethusa. A Thracian by birth, Abas founded a tribe known as the Abantians or Abantes. Abas and his Abantian followers migrated to the island of Euboea, where he subsequently reigned as king. He was father of Canethus and Chalcodon, and through the latter grandfather of Elephenor, who is known to have accidentally killed him. In some accounts, Abas was also called the father of Dias, Arethusa, Alcon, Canthus (alternatively the son of Canethus and thus, his grandson).
- Abas, son of Metaneira who was changed by Demeter into a lizard, because he mocked the goddess when she had come on her wanderings into the house of his mother, and drank eagerly to quench her thirst. Other traditions relate the same story of a boy, Ascalabus, and call his mother Misme.
- Abas, an Argive seer, son of Melampus. He was the father of Coeranus, Idmon, and Lysimache.
- Abas, companion of Perseus who killed Pelates, the Cinyphian ally of Phineus, during the battle that broke out at the court of King Cepheus of Ethiopia for the hand of Andromeda.
- Abas, a Centaur who attended the wedding of Pirithous and Hippodamia.
- Abas, defender of Thebes in the war of the Seven against Thebes. He and his sons Cydon and Argus were killed in the battle.
- Abas, a Theban charioteer during the war of the Seven against Thebes. At the beginning of the battle, he is pierced by Pheres with a spear and left groaning for his life.
- Abas, son of the Trojan Eurydamas and brother of Polyidus; he fought in the Trojan War and was killed by Diomedes.
- Abas, servant of King Lycomedes on the island of Scyros. His job was to keep an eye on shipping traffic from the watchtower and to report directly to the king whether ships arrive at the port. When Odysseus came to the island with his ship to persuade Achilles, who was concealed as a girl, to take part in the War against Troy, the dutiful Abas was the first to report to the king that unknown sails were approaching the coast.
- Abas, another defender of Troy, was killed by Sthenelus.
- Abas, one of Diomedes's companions, whom Aphrodite turned into a swan.

In the Aeneid, the name Abas belongs to two companions of Aeneas:

- Abas, captain whose ship was routed in the storm off Carthage.
- Abas, an Etruscan ally from Populonia in the war against the Rutulians and the Latians. He was later on killed by Lausus, the man who led one thousand soldiers from the town of Agylla.
