= Exadius =

Lapith from Greek mythology

In Greek mythology, Exadius (Ancient Greek: Ἐξάδιος) was one of the Lapiths who attended the nuptial of their king Pirithous and his bride Hippodamia, and participated in the celebrated Centauromachy.

== Mythology ==
Exadius was a distinguished warrior during the contest between the Lapiths and the centaurs where he eventually killed the centaur Gryneus.

Exadius threatened, 'You shall not escape! Let me but have a weapon!' And with that, he whirled the antlers of a votive stag, which he found there, hung on a tall pine-tree; and with that double-branching horn he pierced the eyes of Gryneus, and he gouged them out. One eye stuck to the horn; the other rolled down on his beard, to which it strictly clung in dreadful clotted gore.

— Ovid, Metamorphoses, 12.265-270
