= Antianeira of Argos =

In Greek mythology, Antianeira (Ancient Greek: Ἀντιάνειρα, romanized: Antiáneira, lit. 'a match for men') may have been mother of the Argonaut Idmon by the god Apollo. The scholiast on Apollonius Rhodius, however, calls Asteria the mother of Idmon.
