= Hopleus =

In Greek mythology, Hopleus (Ancient Greek: Ὁπλεύς) was the name of the following figures:

- Hopleus, an Arcadian prince as one of the 50 sons of the impious King Lycaon either by the naiad Cyllene, Nonacris or by unknown woman. He and his brothers were the most nefarious and carefree of all people. To test them, Zeus visited them in the form of a peasant. These brothers mixed the entrails of a child into the god's meal, whereupon the enraged Zeus threw the meal over the table. Hopleus was killed, along with his brothers and their father, by a lightning bolt of the god.
- Hopleus, a Thessalian prince as the son of Poseidon and princess Canace, daughter of King Aeolus of Aeolia. He was the brother of Aloeus, Epopeus, Nireus and Triopas.
- Hopleus, one of the Lapiths who fought against the Centaurs.
- Hopleus, a soldier in the army of the Seven against Thebes and a comrade of Tydeus. He was killed by Aepytus.
