= Titarisios =

Location
- Country: Greece

Physical characteristics
- Source
  - location: Mount Olympus
  - elevation: 65 m (213 ft)
- Mouth
  - location: Pineios
  - coordinates: 39°47′34″N 22°23′9″E
- Length: 70 km (43 mi)

Basin features
- Progression: Pineios→ Aegean Sea

The Titarisios (Greek: Τιταρήσιος, formerly Ξεριάς - Xerias) is a river in Thessaly, Greece. It is a major tributary of the Pineios. The river begins at the western slopes of Mount Olympus and flows southwest, then south. It leaves the mountains near the village Sykia, and turns east near the village Vlachogianni. It passes along the town Tyrnavos and flows into the Pineios near the village Rodia. The confluence is at 65 m above sea level. Its total length is 70 km, and for most of its length it contains water throughout the year.

The vegetation along the river is characterised by reeds, mainly the Phragmites australis, and by wetland forest with trees like plane trees, willows and poplars. According to the classification system of wetland types of the Ramsar Convention adopted in 1999, the Titarisios river falls into the category of inland wetlands. The river is currently primarily used for irrigation, although this has been declining recently. Major construction projects have caused drastic changes to the wetlands. The wetlands of the Titarisios are threatened by uncontrolled waste disposal, for instance near the villages Rodia, Vryotopos and Deleria.

Around 3 km from Argyroupoli is Lake Mati Tyrnavou. Mati is today the only natural lake in Thessaly and although it has only a small area (25 ha) it is the core of an ecosystem with rich flora and fauna.

== Flora ==
Several types of vegetation are found along the river Titarisios:

- reed vegetation, e.g. Arundo donax (giant cane) and Phragmites australis (common reed)
- halophytic and hemihalophytic vegetation, e.g. Juncus maritimus (sea rush), Salicornia herbacea (glasswort) and Chenopodium bonus-henricus (Good King Henry)
- dune vegetation, e.g. Salsola kali (prickly saltwort), Amaranthus retroflexus (redroot pigweed) and Portulaca oleracea (purslane)
- wetland forest vegetation, e.g. Populus nigra (black poplar), Platanus orientalis (oriental plane), Populus alba (silver poplar), Ulmus minor (elm) and Salix alba (white willow)
- wet meadow vegetation, e.g. Mentha longifolia (horse mint) and various species of Trifolium (clover)
- garrigue vegetation, represented by various species of Euphorbia (spurge)

== Fauna ==
Specific studies of the fish in the Titarisios river have not been done, but 37 species of fish have been reported, and another 11 species are presumed present. Due to its connection to sea via the Pineios, the Titarisios also contains migratory fish like the Acipenser sturio (European sea sturgeon) and Alosa fallax (twait shad). Also the Nemacheilus barbatulus (stone loach) and the Sabanejewia aurata balcanica (golden loach) have been found.
