= Lapiths =

Legendary people in Greek mythology

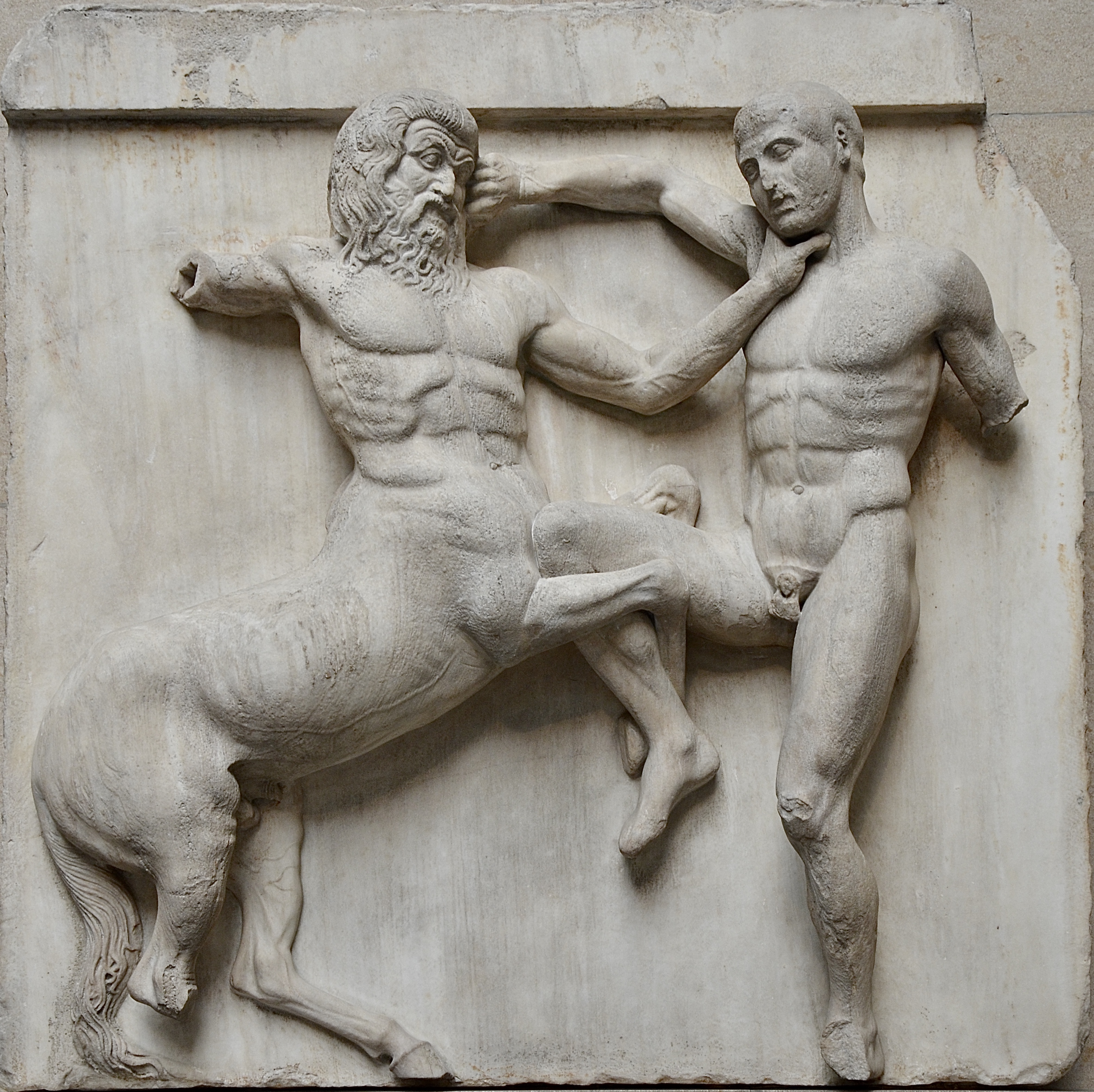
Metope from the Elgin Marbles depicting a centaur and a Lapith fighting

The Lapiths (/ˈlæpɪθs/; Ancient Greek: Λαπίθαι, Lapithai, sing. Λαπίθης) were a group of legendary people in Greek mythology, who lived in Thessaly in the valley of the Pineios and on the mountain Pelion. They were believed to have descended from the mythical Lapithes, brother of Centaurus, with the two heroes giving their names to the races of the Lapiths and the centaurs respectively. The Lapiths are best known for their involvement in the Centauromachy (Ancient Greek: Κενταυρομαχία, romanized: Kentauromachía), a mythical fight that broke out between them and the centaurs during Pirithous and Hippodamia's wedding.

== Mythology ==
=== Origin ===
The Lapiths were an Aeolian tribe who, like the Myrmidons, were natives of Thessaly. The genealogies make them a kindred people with the centaurs: In one version, Lapithes (Λαπίθης) and Centaurus (Κένταυρος) were said to be twin sons of the god Apollo and the nymph Stilbe, daughter of the river god Peneus. Lapithes was a valiant warrior, but Centaurus was a deformed being who later mated with mares from whom the race of half-man, half-horse centaurs came. Lapithes was the eponymous ancestor of the Lapith people, and his descendants include Lapith warriors and kings, such as Ixion, Pirithous, Caeneus, and Coronus, and the seers Ampycus and his son Mopsus.

In the Iliad the Lapiths send forty crewed ships to join the Greek fleet in the Trojan War, commanded by Polypoetes (son of Pirithous) and Leonteus (son of Coronus, son of Caeneus). The mother of Pirithous, the Lapith queen in the generation before the Trojan War, was Dia, daughter of Eioneus or Deioneus; Ixion was the father of Pirithous, but like many heroic figures, Pirithous had an immortal as well as a mortal father. (Note: For such superfecundation, compare the siring of Theseus or Heracles. Of a supposed Parnassos, founder of Delphi, Pausanias observes, "Like the other heroes, as they are called, he had two fathers; one they say was the god Poseidon, the human father being Cleopompus.") Zeus was his immortal father, but the god had to assume a stallion's form to cover Dia for, like their half-horse cousins, the Lapiths were horsemen in the grasslands of Thessaly, famous for its horses. The Lapiths were credited with inventing the bridle's bit. The Lapith King Pirithous was marrying the horsewoman Hippodameia, whose name means "tamer of horses", at the wedding feast that made a war, the Centauromachy, famous.

=== Centauromachy ===
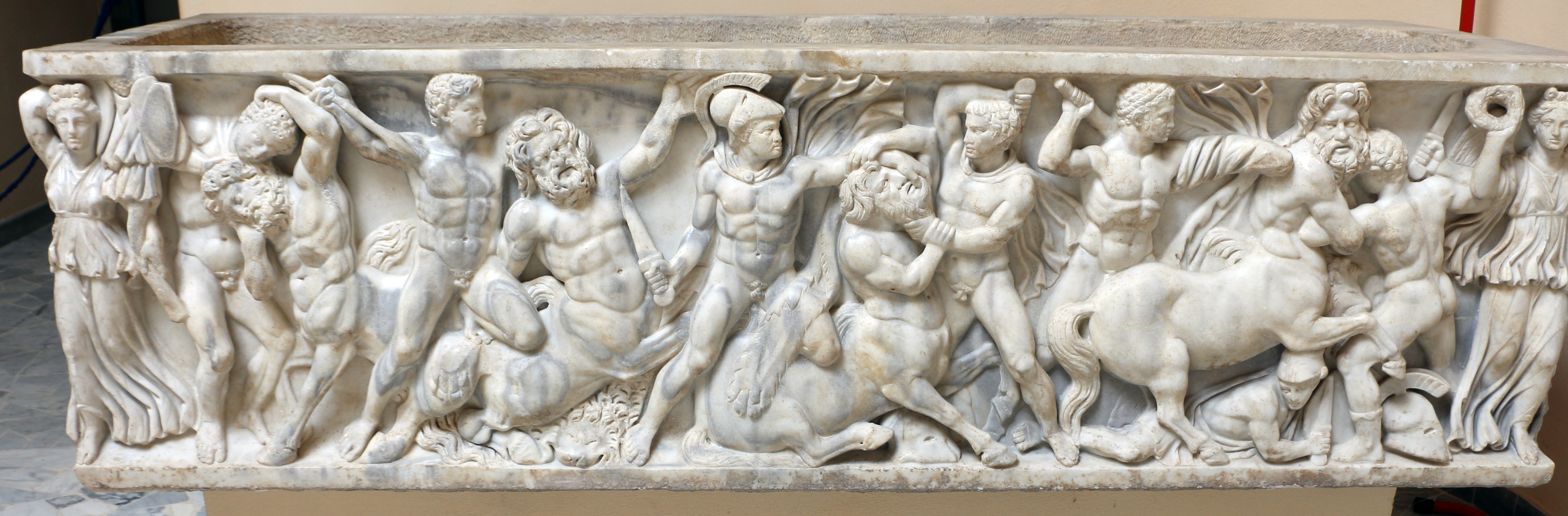
A centauromachy relief on an ancient Roman sarcophagus, c. 150 AD, Museo Archeologico Ostiense

In the Centauromachy ('Battle with Centaurs'), the Lapiths battle with the Centaurs at the wedding feast of Pirithous. The Centaurs had been invited, but, unused to wine, their wild nature came to the fore. When the bride, Hippodamia, was presented to greet the guests, the centaur Eurytion, described as "The wildest of the centaurs", leapt up and attempted to abduct her. All the other centaurs were up in a moment, attempting to carry off the Greek women. In the battle that ensued, Theseus came to the Lapiths' aid. They cut off Eurytion's ears and nose and threw him out. After the battle the defeated centaurs were expelled from Thessaly to the northwest.

The Lapith Caeneus was originally a young woman named Caenis and the favorite of Poseidon, who changed her into a man at her request, and made Caeneus into an invulnerable warrior. Such warrior women, indistinguishable from men, were familiar among the Scythian horsemen too. In the battle with the centaurs Caeneus proved invulnerable, until the centaurs crushed him with rocks and trunks of trees. He disappeared into the depths of the earth unharmed and was released as a sandy-headed bird.

In later contests, the centaurs were not so easily beaten. Mythic references explained the presence into historic times of primitive Lapiths in Malea and in the brigand stronghold of Pholoe in Elis as remnants of groups driven there by the centaurs. Some historic Greek cities bore names connected with Lapiths, and the Kypselides of Corinth claimed descent from Cæneus, while the Phylaides of Attica claimed for progenitor Koronus the Lapith.

== In art ==
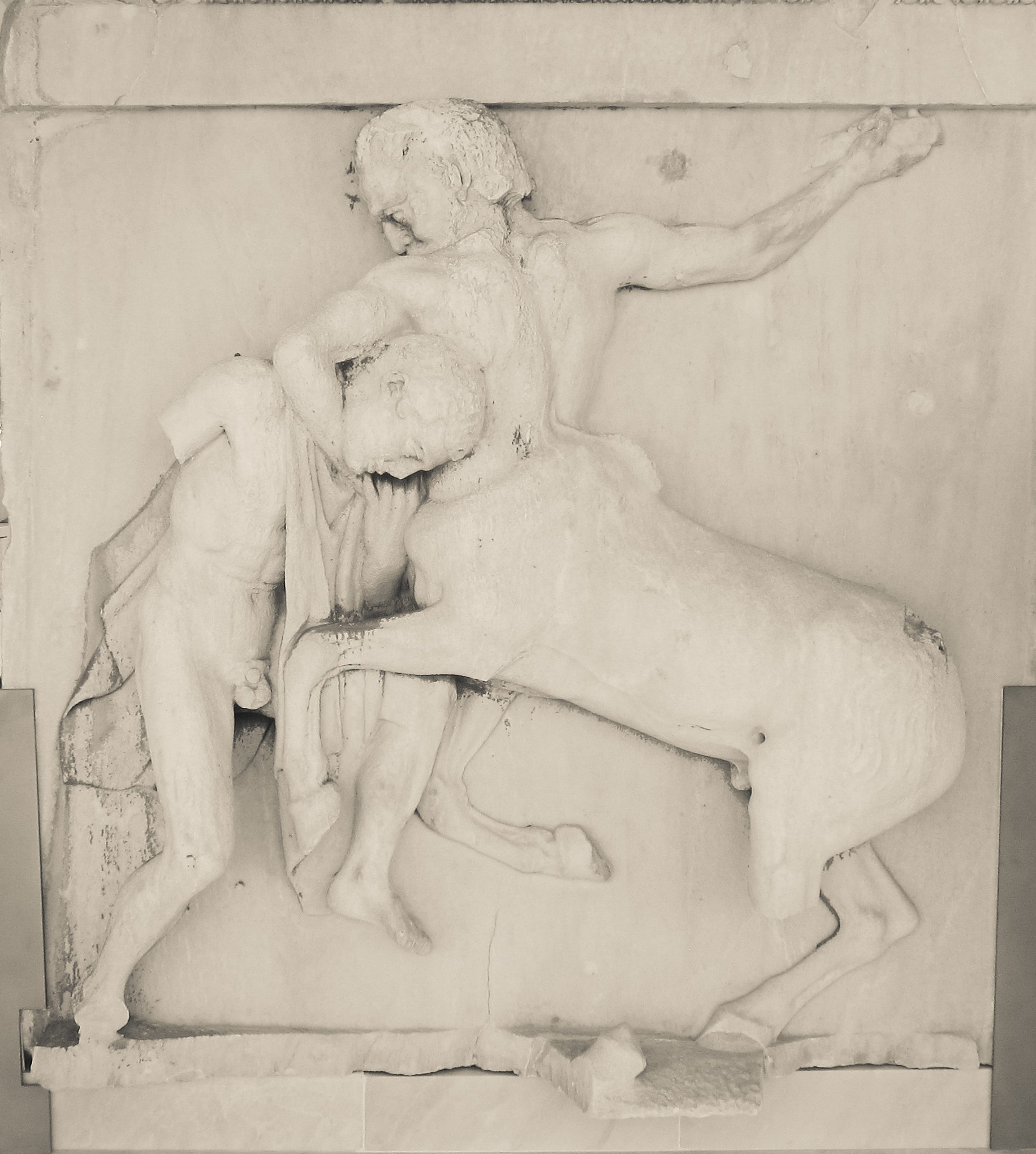
Battle between a centaur and a Lapith, Parthenon south metopes

As Greek myth became more mediated through philosophy, the battle between Lapiths and centaurs took on aspects of the interior struggle between civilized and wild behavior, made concrete in the Lapiths' understanding of the right usage of God-given wine, which must be tempered with water and drunk not to excess. The Greek sculptors of the school of Pheidias conceived of the battle of the Lapiths and centaurs as a struggle between mankind and mischievous monsters, and symbolical of the great conflict between the civilized Greeks and "barbarians". Battles between Lapiths and centaurs were depicted in the sculptured metopes on the Parthenon, recalling Athenian Theseus' treaty of mutual admiration with Pirithous the Lapith, leader of the Magnetes, and on Zeus' temple at Olympia The battle of the Lapiths and centaurs was a familiar symposium theme for the vase-painters.

A sonnet vividly evoking the battle by the French poet José María de Heredia (1842–1905) was included in his volume Les Trophées. (Note: La foule nuptiale au festin s'est ruée, centaures et guerriers ivres, hardis et beaux; Et la chair héroïque, au reflet des flambeaux, Se mêle au poil ardent des fils de la Nuée. Rires, tumulte ... Un cri ! ... L'Epouse polluée Que presse un noir poitrail, sous la pourpre en lambeaux Se débat, et l'airain sonne au choc des sabots Et la table s'écroule à travers la huée. Alors celui pour qui le plus grand est un nain, Se lève. Sur son crâne, un mufle léonin Se fronce, hérissé de crins d'or. C'est Hercule. Et d'un bout de la salle immense à l'autre bout, Dompté par l'oeil terrible où la colère bout, Le troupeau monstrueux en renâclant recule. The wedding crowd at the feast surged, centaurs and drunken warriors, bold and handsome; and the heroic flesh, in the flicker of the torches, blends with the burning hair of the Sons of the Cloud. Laughter, turmoil ... A cry! ... The polluted bride pressed by a dark chest, beneath ripped purple struggles, and the brass rings to the clash of hooves And the table collapses amid the jeers. Then he, for whom the greatest is a dwarf, rises. On his skull, a leonine snout frowns, bristling with golden hair. It is Hercules. And from one end of the immense hall to the other, tamed by the dreadful eye where wrath boils, the monstrous herd recoils, balking.) In the Renaissance, the battle became a favorite theme for artists: An excuse to display close-packed bodies in violent confrontation. The young Michelangelo executed a marble bas-relief of the subject in Florence about 1492. Piero di Cosimo's panel Battle of centaurs and Lapiths, now at the National Gallery, London, was painted during the following decade. If it was originally part of a marriage chest, or cassone, it was perhaps an uneasy subject for a festive wedding commemoration. A frieze with a centauromachy was also painted by Luca Signorelli in his Virgin Enthroned with Saints (1491), inspired by a Roman sarcophagus found at Cortona, in Tuscany, during the early 15th century.

== List of Lapiths ==
Lapiths
Names	Sources			Centauromachy		Notes
Names	Hesiod	Ovid	Others	Participant	Killed by	Notes
Actor		✓		✓	Centaur Clanis	
Ampyx		✓		✓		
Caeneus	✓	✓		✓	buried alive by centaurs, or killed himself	was formerly a woman called Caenis
Broteas		✓		✓	Centaur Gryneus	
Celadon		✓		✓	Centaur Amycus	
Charaxus		✓		✓	Rhoetus	
Cometes		✓		✓	Charaxus, his friend, accidentally	
Corythus		✓		✓	Centaur Rhoetus	
Cymelus		✓		✓	Centaur Nessus	
Dryas	✓			✓		son of Ares or Iapetus
Euagrus		✓		✓	Centaur Rhoetus	
Exadius	✓	✓		✓		
Halesus		✓		✓	Centaur Latreus	
Hopleus	✓			✓		
Macareus		✓		✓		
Mopsus	✓	✓		✓		son of Ampycus and a seer
Orius		✓		✓	Centaur Gryneus	son of Mycale
Pelates		✓		✓		a Lapith from Pella (in Macedonia)
Periphas		✓		✓		
Phalereus	✓			✓		
Phorbas				✓		son of Triopas or of Lapithus, son of Apollo
Polyphemus						son of Eilatus.
Pirithous	✓			✓		
Prolochus	✓			✓		
Tectaphus		✓		✓	Centaur Phaecomes	son of Olenus
Other allies
Crantor		✓		✓	Centaur Demoleon	son of Amyntor
Nestor		✓		✓		
Peleus		✓		✓		
Theseus	✓	✓		✓		

== Sources ==
- Smith, William, ed. (1870). "Lapithes". Dictionary of Greek and Roman Biography and Mythology. Vol. II. p. 721. Archived from the original on 2013-10-16.
- Homer. Odyssey. XXI, 330–340.
- Homer. Iliad. xii, 128, 181.
- Pausanias. Description of Greece. 1.17.2, 5.10.8.
- Strabo. Geographica. ix.39.
- Horace. Carmina [Odes]. i. 18. 5.
- Gaius Plinius Secundus. Natural History. IV: 8, 15; XXXVI: 5, 4.
- Diodorus Siculus. Bibliotheca historica. iv.69–70; v. 61.
- Hyginus. Fabulae. 45 & 173.
- Gaius Valerius Flaccus. Argonautica. 1.146.
- Ovid. Metamorphoses. XII passim.
