= Hippodamia (wife of Pirithous) =

Wife of Pirithous in Greek mythology

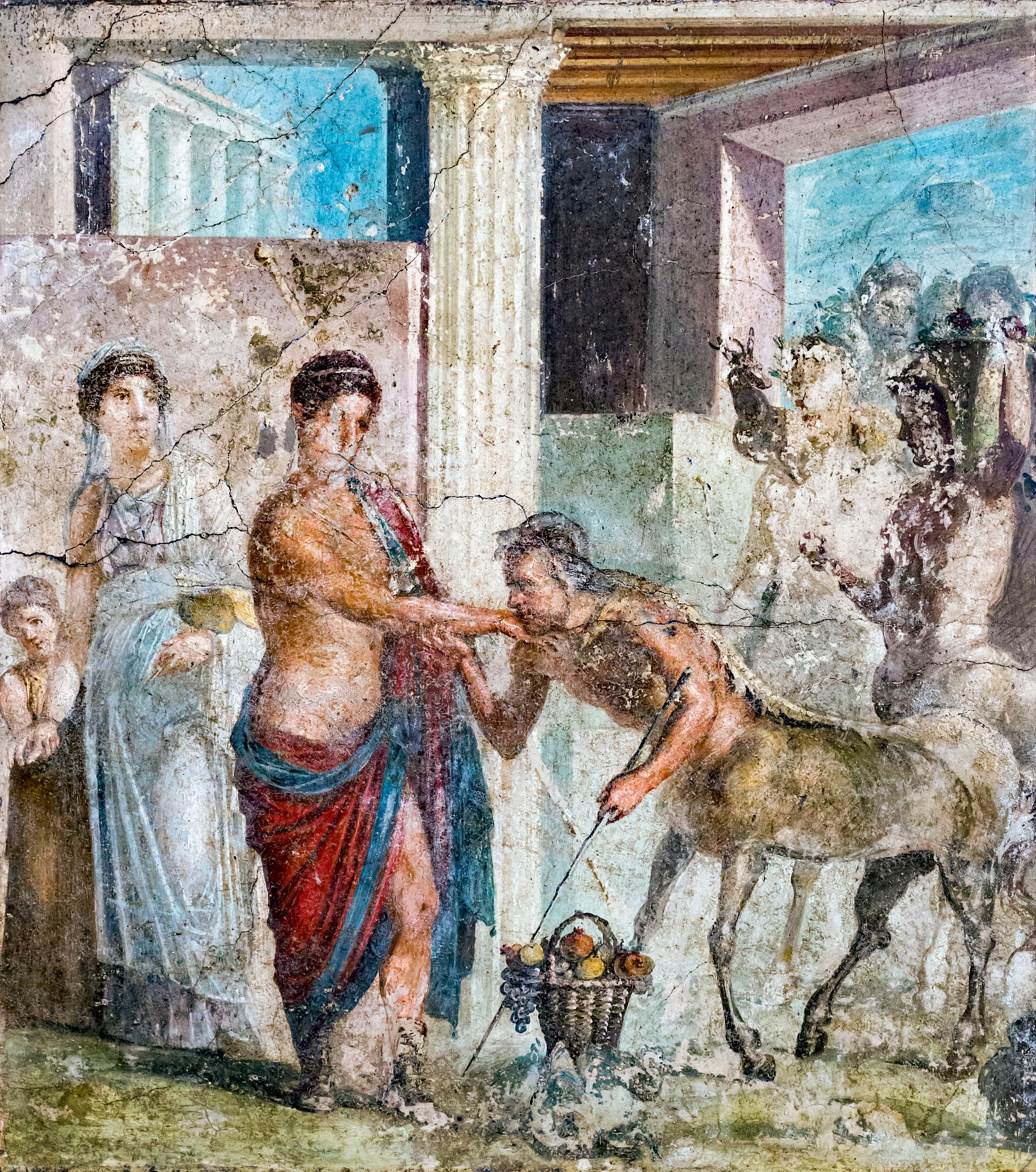
Hippodamia greeted by a seemingly genteel Centaur in a wall painting from Pompeii.

Hippodamia (/ˌhɪpɒdəˈmaɪ.ə/; Ancient Greek: Ἱπποδάμεια means 'she who masters horses' derived from ἵππος hippos "horse" and δαμάζειν damazein "to tame") was the daughter of Atrax or Butes or Adrastus and the bride of King Pirithous of the Lapiths in Greek mythology.

She was also known as Deidamia (/ˌdaɪdəˈmaɪ.ə/; Ancient Greek: Δηιδάμεια), Laodamia /ˌleɪ.ədəˈmaɪ.ə/, Hippoboteia /ˌhɪpəbəˈtaɪ.ə/, Dia /ˈdaɪ.ə/ or Ischomache /ɪˈskɒməkiː/).

== The rape of Hippodamia according to Ovid ==
Ovid recounts the myth of the rape of Hippodamia in the 12th book of his Metamorphoses, combining the various versions that had been handed down to form a coherent narrative.

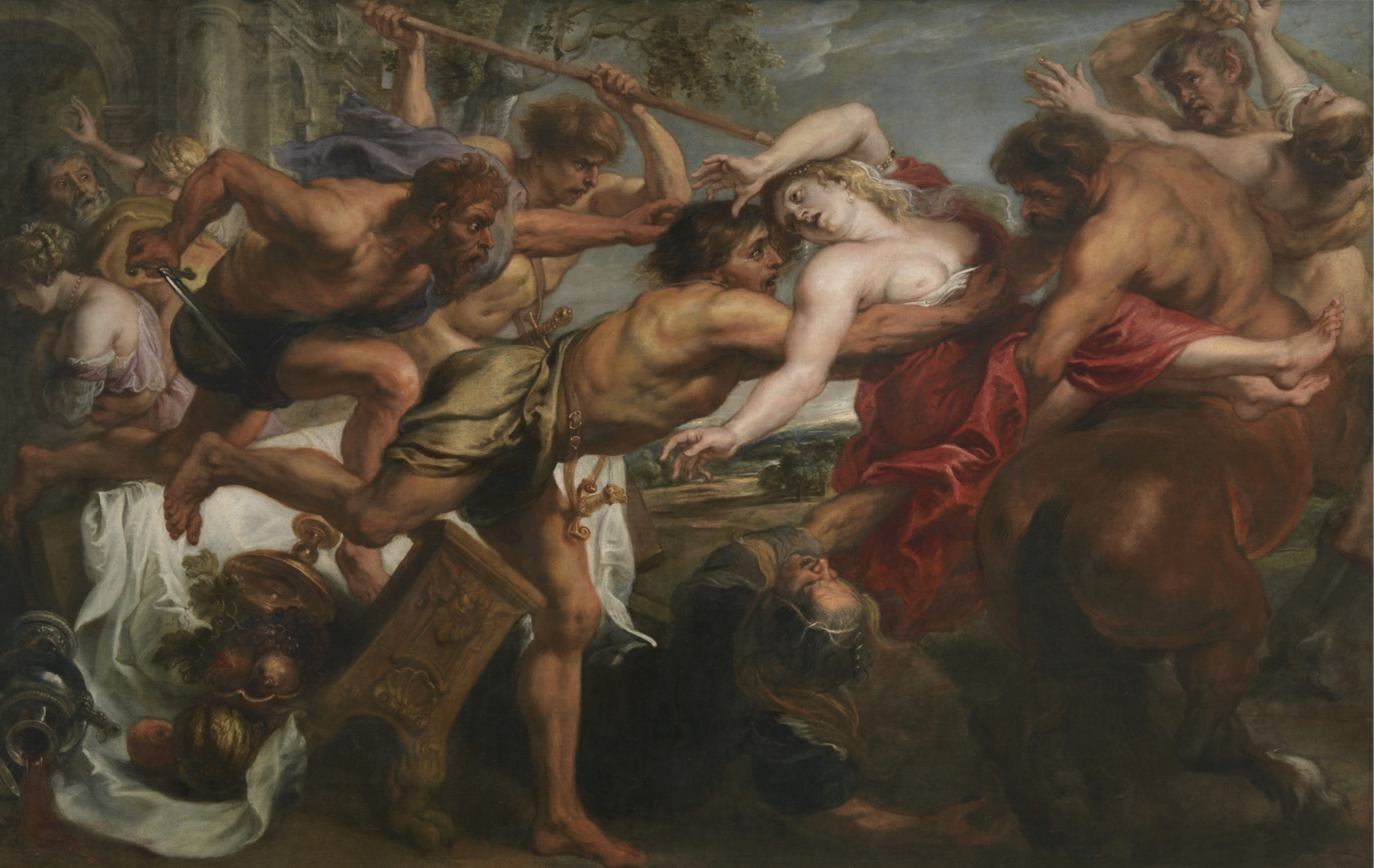
The Rape of Hippodamia, Rubens, c. 1637

After Achilles strangled Cycnus in battle before Troy (verses 140–143), there was a victory feast (verse 150). At the feast Nestor recounted the attempted kidnapping of Hippodamia by the centaur Eurytion (Latinized by Ovid as Eurytus) and the ensuing battle with the Greek hero Theseus which Nestor had witnessed himself. The story told by Nestor goes as follows: when Pirithous celebrates his wedding to Hippodamia, he allows some centaurs to attend the wedding feast (210–211). The centaurs are mythical creatures from Greek mythology which have the upper body of a human and the lower body and legs of a horse. On the bride's arrival in the company of her female retinue of matrons and young women, all the guests praise Pirithous for his fortunate choice of wife (verses 212–218). The drunken centaur Eurytus is particularly excited by the sight of the bride as described in prose translation: For you, Eurytus, wildest of the wild centaurs, as your chest glowed with wine, the sight of the maiden ignited you, and drunkenness, doubled by desire, gained the upper hand.

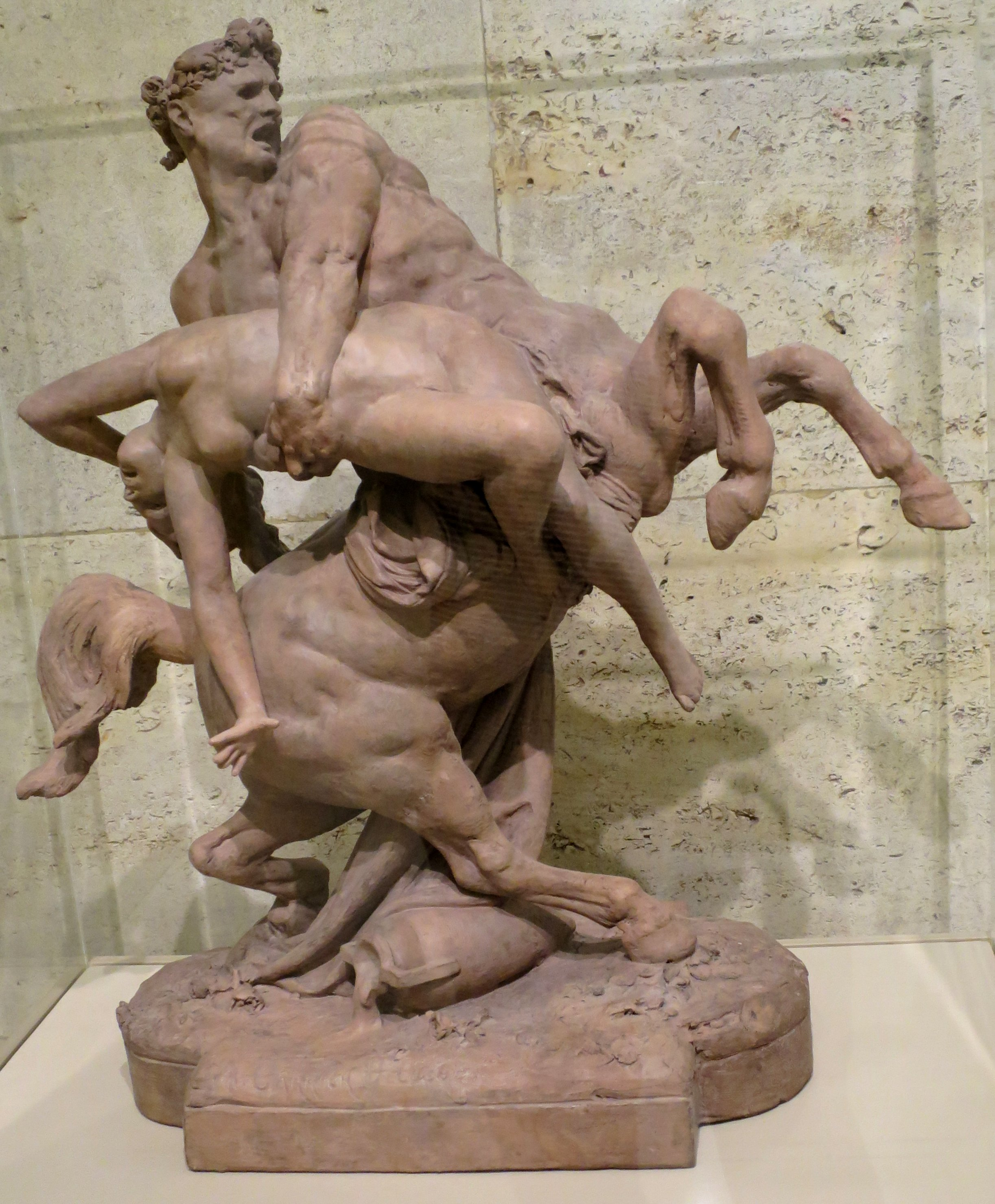
Rape of Hippodamia by Albert-Ernest Carrier-Belleuse

Driven by desire, Eurytus overturns the tables and starts dragging the bride away by her hair. Seeing this, the other centaurs grab the other women they desire most (verses 222–225). All the men present then rise to their feet. Theseus succeeds in saving Hippodamia from Eurytus' clutches and violently smashes his brain in with a bowl (225–231). The other centaurs, seeking to avenge their slain brother, attack the men, and in the ensuing battle, known as the Centauromachy, the centaurs are slaughtered in a bloodbath. Hippodamia later gives birth to Pirithous's son Polypoetes, and she dies shortly afterwards.

== Artistic representation ==
The abduction of Hippodamia was not an uncommon subject of Western art in the classical tradition, including the sculpture The Abduction of Hippodameia by French artist Albert-Ernest Carrier-Belleuse and a painting by Rubens.
