= Pirithous =

In Greek mythology, the King of the Lapiths

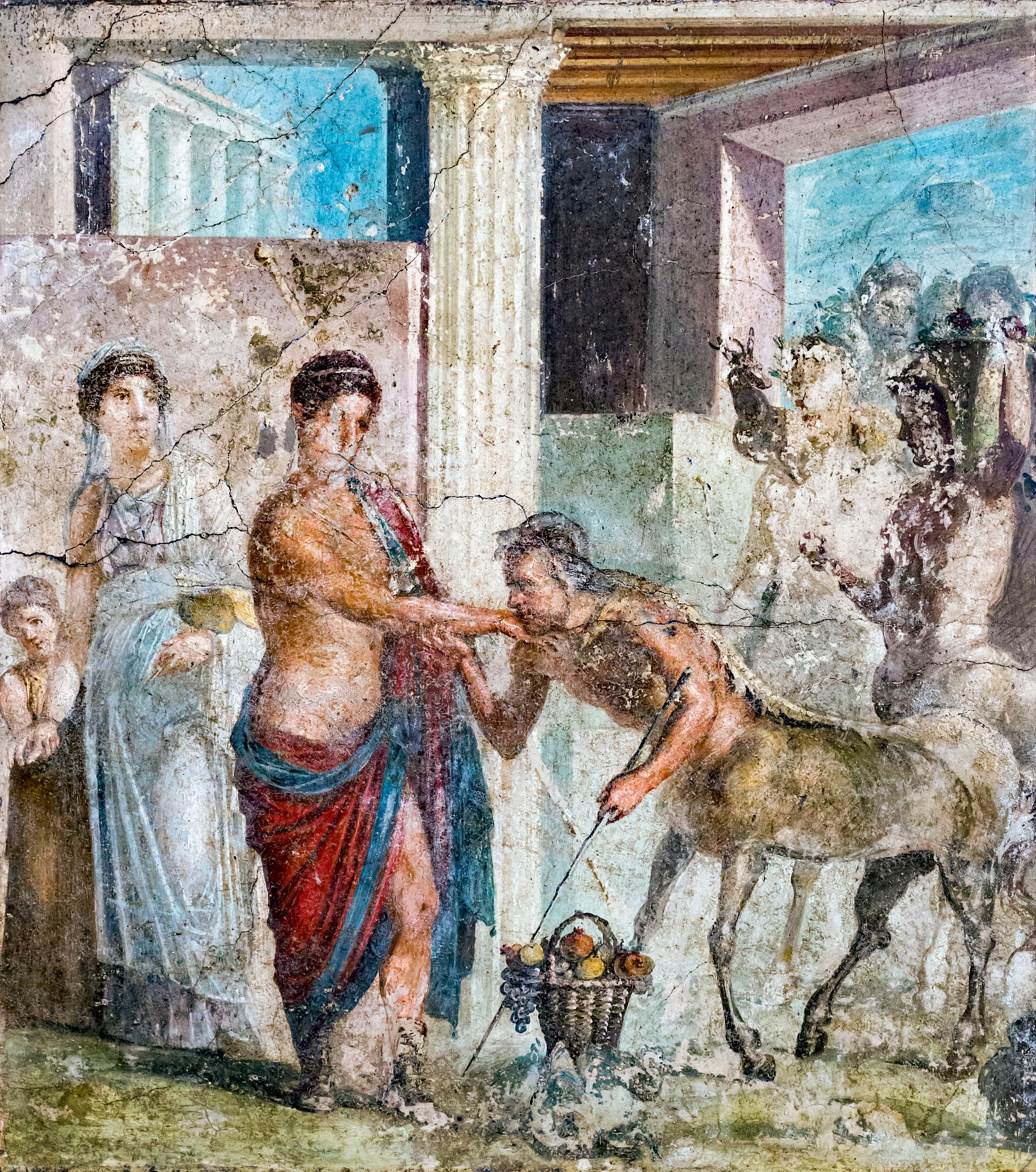
Pirithous and Hippodamia receiving the centaurs at his wedding. Antique fresco from Pompeii.

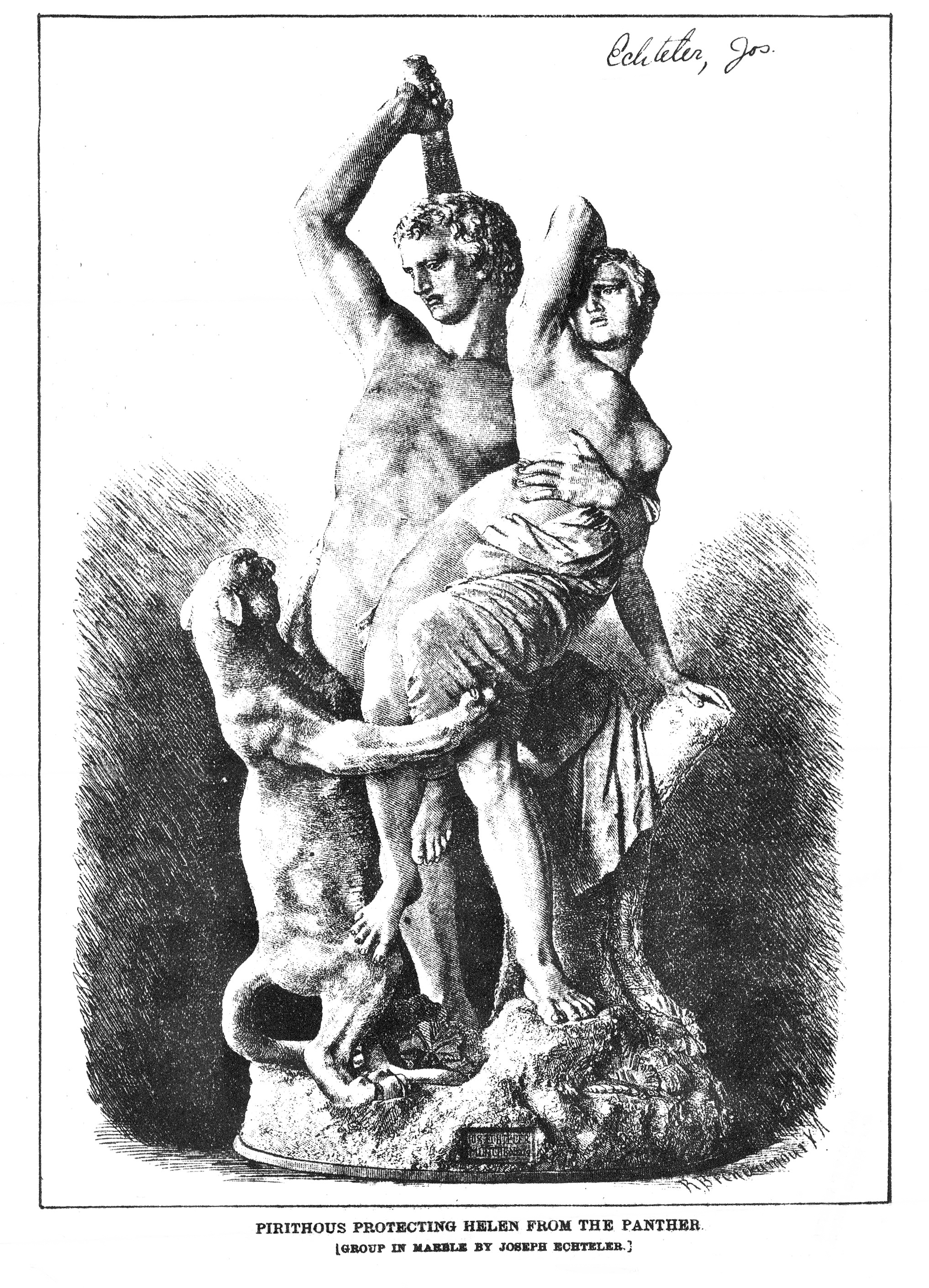
"Pirithous' Kampf um Helena" by Joseph Echteler and Richard Brend'amour

Pirithous (/ˌpaɪˈrɪθoʊ.əs/; Ancient Greek: Πειρίθοος or Πειρίθους, derived from περιθεῖν, perithein, 'to run around'; also transliterated as Perithous), in Greek mythology, was the King of the Lapiths of Larissa in Thessaly, as well as best friend to Theseus.

== Biography ==
Pirithous was a son of "heavenly" Dia, fathered either by Ixion or by Zeus. He married Hippodamia, daughter of Atrax or Butes, at whose wedding the famous Battle of Lapiths and Centaurs occurred. By his wife, he became the father of Polypoetes, one of the Greek leaders during the Trojan War. Pirithous was also the close friend of the hero Theseus.

=== Early years ===
According to a scholiast on Homer, Dia had sex with Zeus, who was disguised as a stallion, and gave birth to Pirithous; a folk etymology derived Pirithous' name from peritheein (περιθεῖν, 'to run around'), because that was what Zeus did to seduce Dia.

His best friend was Theseus. In the Iliad I, Nestor numbers Pirithous and Theseus "of heroic fame" among an earlier generation of heroes of his youth, "the strongest men that Earth has bred, the strongest men against the strongest enemies, a savage mountain-dwelling tribe whom they utterly destroyed." No trace of such an oral tradition, which Homer's listeners would have recognized in Nestor's allusion, survived in literary epic.

In disjointed episodes that have survived, Pirithous had heard rumors about Theseus' courage and strength in battle but he wanted proof. He rustled Theseus' herd of cattle from Marathon, and Theseus set out to pursue him. Pirithous took up arms and the pair met, then became so impressed with each other's gracefulness, beauty and courage they took an oath of friendship. They were among the company of heroes that hunted the Calydonian Boar, another mythic theme that was already well known to Homer's listeners.

== Centauromachy ==
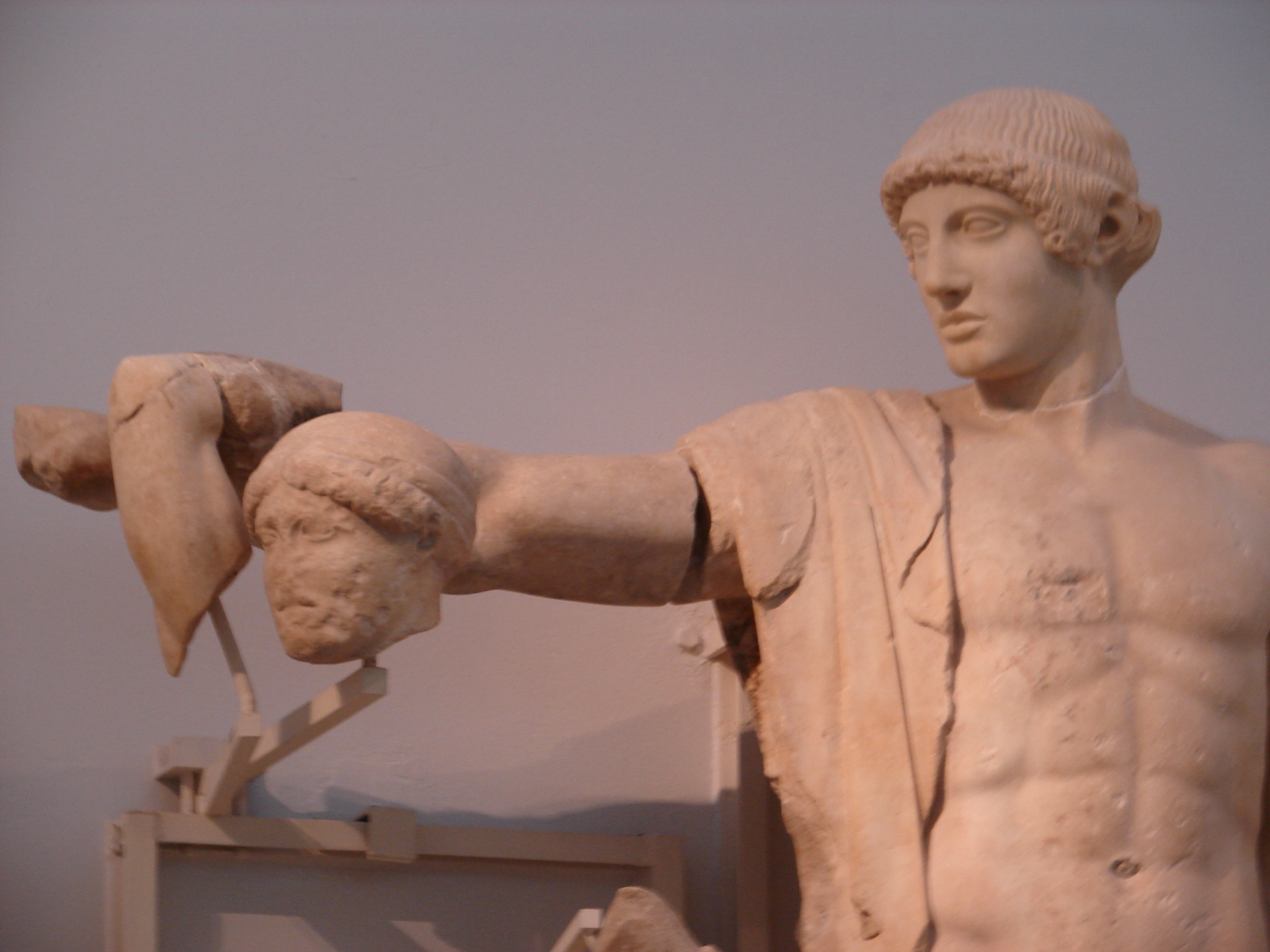
Pirithous next to Apollo from the west pediment of the temple of Zeus at Olympia, 460s BC.

Later, Pirithous was set to marry Hippodamia, their offspring being Polypoetes. The centaurs were guests at the party, but they got drunk and tried to abduct the women, including Hippodamia who was carried off by the intoxicated centaur Eurytion or Eurytus. The Lapiths won the ensuing battle, the Centauromachy, a favorite motif of Greek art.

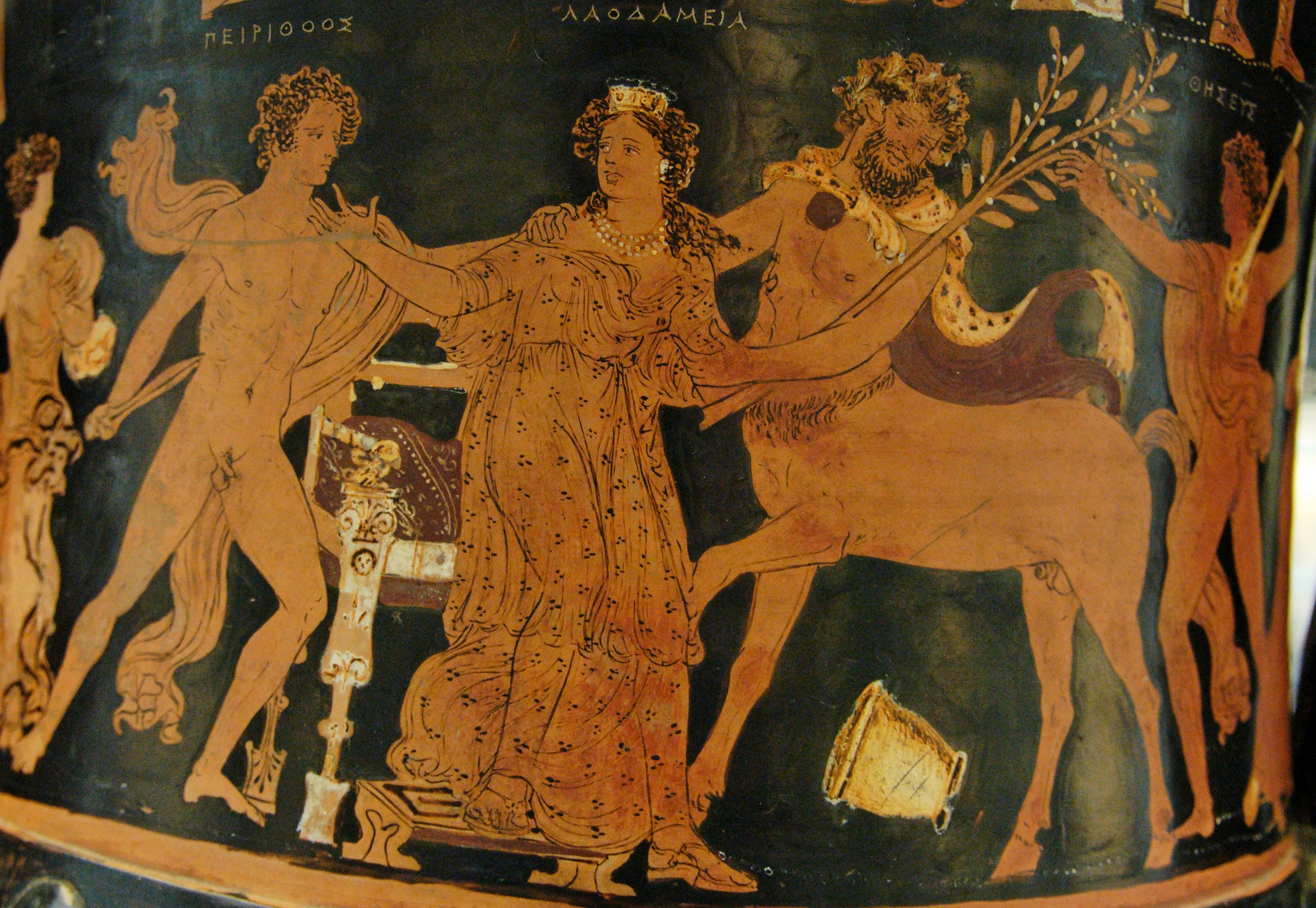
Pirithous, Hippodamia (here labeled under the name Laodameia), a Centaur, and Theseus, on an Apulian red-figure calyx-krater, 350-340 BC.

== Punishment in the Underworld ==
Hippodamia died shortly after Polypoetes' birth, after which Pirithous went to visit Theseus at Athens only to discover that Theseus' own wife, Phaedra, who, according to Ovid, felt left out by her husband's love for Pirithous, was dead. Thus, Pirithous and Theseus pledged to marry daughters of Zeus; Theseus chose Helen of Sparta and together they kidnapped her when she was 10 years of age and decided to hold on to her until she was old enough to marry. Pirithous chose a more dangerous prize: Persephone herself. Theseus objected, and tried to talk him out of it, as this act would be too blasphemous; but Pirithous insisted, and Theseus was bound by his oaths, so he agreed. They left Helen with Theseus' mother, Aethra, at Aphidnae, and traveled to the underworld. When they stopped to rest, they found themselves unable to stand up from the rock as they saw the Furies appear before them.

=== Rescue ===
Heracles later freed Theseus from the stone, during his Twelfth and final Labour, but the earth shook when he attempted to free Pirithous. He had committed too great a crime for wanting the wife of one of the great gods as his own bride. According to a scholium on Aristophanes, in a lost play by Euripides or Critias, Hades had Pirithous fed to Cerberus for his impiety. By the time Theseus returned to Athens, the Dioscuri (Helen's twin brothers Castor and Pollux) had taken Helen back to Sparta; they had taken captive Aethra as well as Pirithous' sister, Physadeia, and they became handmaidens of Helen and later followed her to Troy.

The rescue of Theseus and Pirithous acquired a humorous tone in the realm of Attic comedy, in which Heracles attempted to free them from the rock to which they had been bound together in the Underworld (for having tried to carry off Persephone). He succeeded in freeing only Theseus and left behind his buttocks attached to the rocks. Due to this Theseus came to be called Hypolispos, meaning "with hinder parts rubbed smooth". This may have been a later invention.

Pirithous was worshiped at Athens, along with Theseus, as a hero.

== Gallery ==
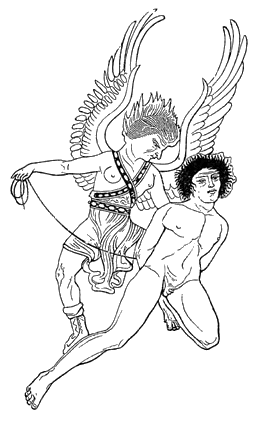
Erinnye, den Peirithoos in der Unterwelt bindend (Vasenbild) (circa 1885)

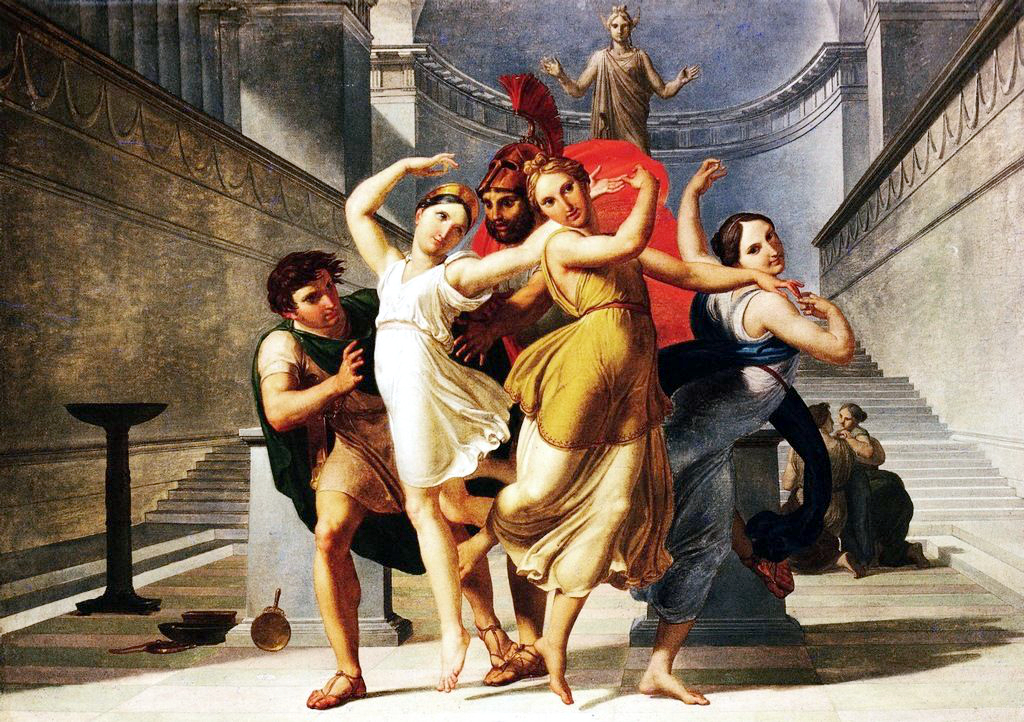
Theseus and Pirithous abducting Elena by Pelagio Palagi (1814)

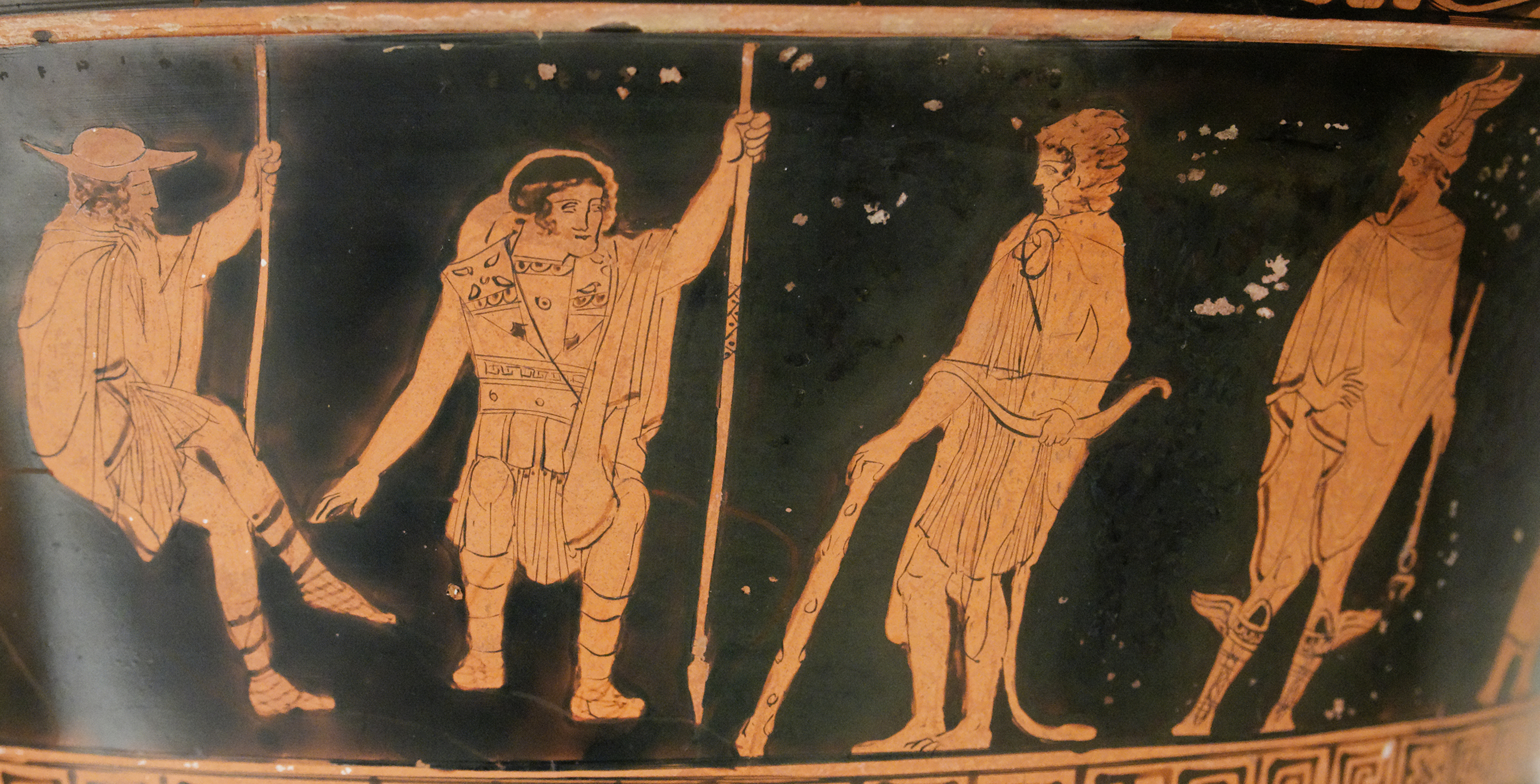
Herakles, Theseus and Pirithoos in Hades, with Hermes. (Attic red-figure calyx-krater between circa 450 and circa 440 BC)

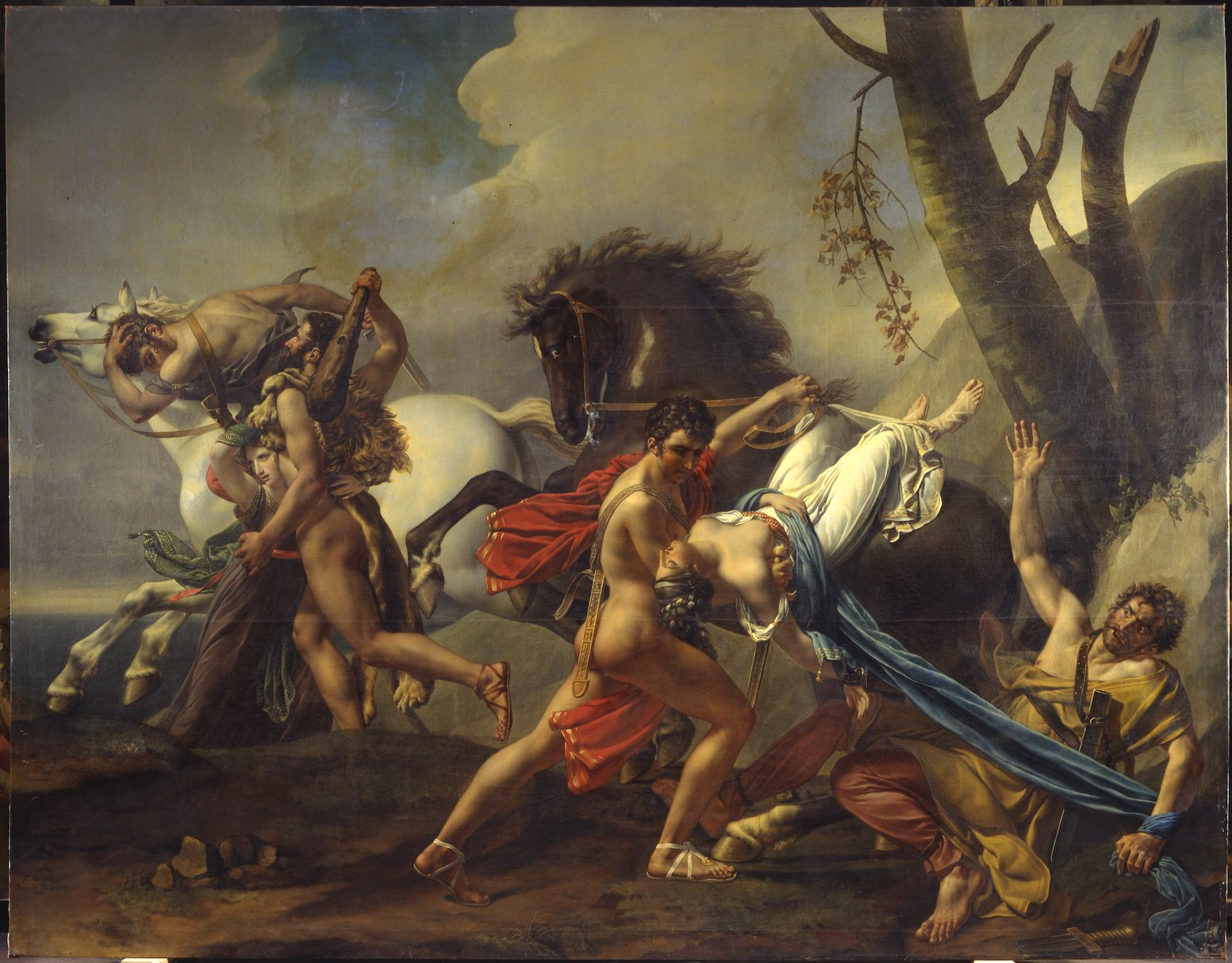
Theseus and Pirithoüs Clearing the Earth of Brigands, Deliver Two Women from the Hands of their Abductors by Angelique Mongez (1806)

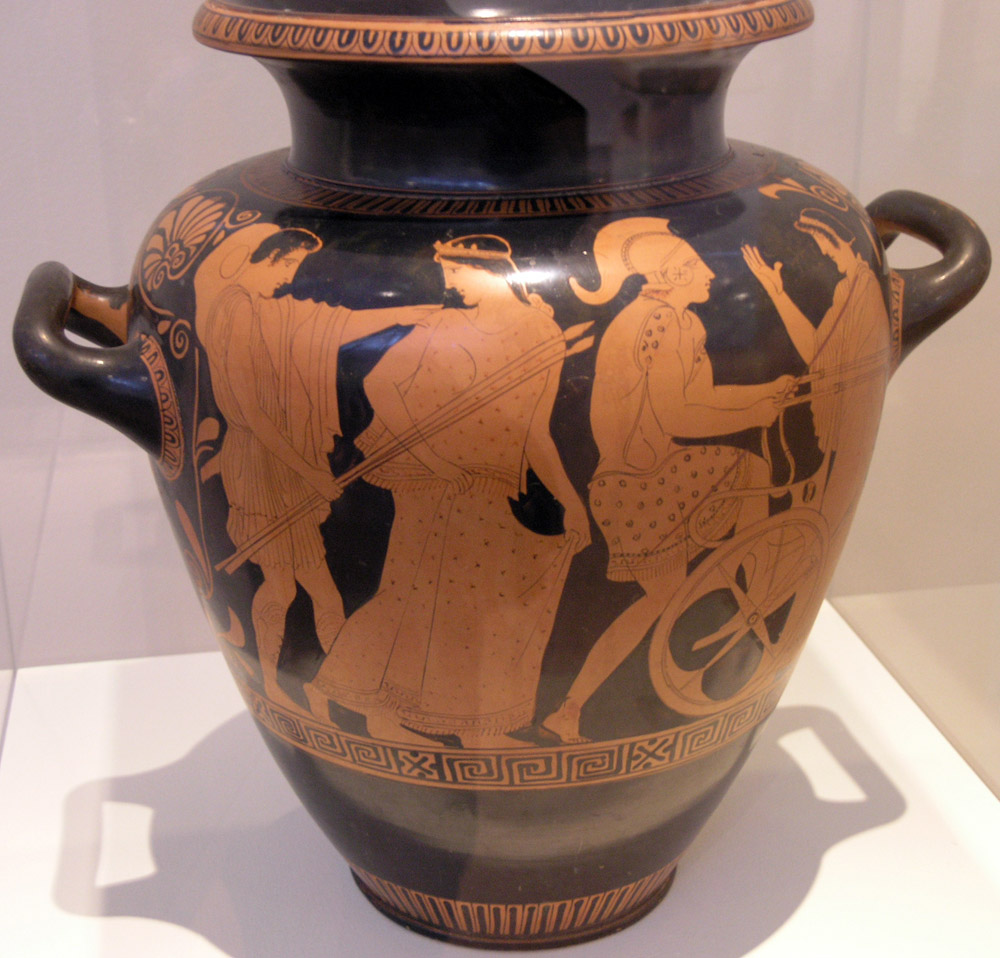
Theseus leading Helen to a chariot arranged by Peirithoos. Helen's sister, Phoibe (on the right), watches on. Attic red-figure stamnos by Polygnotos, ca. 430-420 BC.

== Bibliography ==
- Diodorus Siculus, The Library of History translated by Charles Henry Oldfather. Twelve volumes. Loeb Classical Library. Cambridge, Massachusetts: Harvard University Press; London: William Heinemann, Ltd. 1989. Vol. 3. Books 4.59–8. Online version at Bill Thayer's Web Site
- Diodorus Siculus, Bibliotheca Historica. Vol 1-2. Immanel Bekker. Ludwig Dindorf. Friedrich Vogel. in aedibus B. G. Teubneri. Leipzig. 1888–1890. Greek text available at the Perseus Digital Library.
- Gaius Julius Hyginus, Fabulae from The Myths of Hyginus translated and edited by Mary Grant. University of Kansas Publications in Humanistic Studies. Online version at the Topos Text Project.
- Homer, The Iliad with an English Translation by A.T. Murray, Ph.D. in two volumes. Cambridge, MA., Harvard University Press; London, William Heinemann, Ltd. 1924. Online version at the Perseus Digital Library.
- Homer, Homeri Opera in five volumes. Oxford, Oxford University Press. 1920. Greek text available at the Perseus Digital Library.
- Homer, The Odyssey with an English Translation by A.T. Murray, Ph.D. in two volumes. Cambridge, MA., Harvard University Press; London, William Heinemann, Ltd. 1919. Online version at the Perseus Digital Library. Greek text available from the same website.
- Pausanias, Description of Greece with an English Translation by W.H.S. Jones, Litt.D., and H.A. Ormerod, M.A., in 4 Volumes. Cambridge, MA, Harvard University Press; London, William Heinemann Ltd. 1918. Online version at the Perseus Digital Library
- Pausanias, Graeciae Descriptio. 3 vols. Leipzig, Teubner. 1903. Greek text available at the Perseus Digital Library.
- Pliny the Elder, The Natural History. John Bostock, M.D., F.R.S. H.T. Riley, Esq., B.A. London. Taylor and Francis, Red Lion Court, Fleet Street. 1855. Online version at the Perseus Digital Library.
- Pliny the Elder, Naturalis Historia. Karl Friedrich Theodor Mayhoff. Lipsiae. Teubner. 1906. Latin text available at the Perseus Digital Library.
- Pseudo-Apollodorus, The Library with an English Translation by Sir James George Frazer, F.B.A., F.R.S. in 2 Volumes, Cambridge, MA, Harvard University Press; London, William Heinemann Ltd. 1921. Online version at the Perseus Digital Library. Greek text available from the same website.
- Publius Ovidius Naso, Metamorphoses translated by Brookes More (1859–1942). Boston, Cornhill Publishing Co. 1922. Online version at the Perseus Digital Library.
- Publius Ovidius Naso, Metamorphoses. Hugo Magnus. Gotha (Germany). Friedr. Andr. Perthes. 1892. Latin text available at the Perseus Digital Library.
- Publius Vergilius Maro, Aeneid. Theodore C. Williams. trans. Boston. Houghton Mifflin Co. 1910. Online version at the Perseus Digital Library.
- Publius Vergilius Maro, Bucolics, Aeneid, and Georgics. J. B. Greenough. Boston. Ginn & Co. 1900. Latin text available at the Perseus Digital Library.
- William Smith. A Dictionary of Greek and Roman biography and mythology. s.v. Peirithous. London (1848).
