= Rhode (mythology) =

In Greek mythology, Rhode (Ancient Greek: Ῥόδη, romanized: Rhódē, lit. 'rose' or 'where roses grow'') may refer to the following women:

- Rhode, possibly a variant of Rhodeia, one of the 3,000 Oceanid water-nymphs, daughters of the Titans Oceanus and Tethys. She might be the same as well with the below Rhode, daughter of Poseidon.
- Rhode, daughter of Poseidon either by Amphitrite or Halia. She was mother, by Helius, of the Heliadae.
- Rhode, one of the 50 Danaïdes, daughters of Danaus, king of Libya (and later of Argos) either by the hamadryads Atlanteia or Phoebe. On the orders of her father, she married and eventually murdered her cousin–husband Hippolytus, son of King Aegyptus of Egypt by an Arabian woman.
- Rhode, alternatively Rodo, one of the nurses of Dionysus and listed as one of the Maenads who followed him in his Indian campaign.
