= Diocorystes =

In Greek mythology, Diocorystes (Ancient Greek: Διοκορυστὴς) was an Egyptian prince as one of the sons of King Aegyptus.

== Family ==
Diocorystes's mother was an Arabian woman and thus full brother of Istrus, Chalcodon, Agenor, Chaetus, Alces, Alcmenor, Hippothous, Euchenor and Hippolytus. In some accounts, he could be a son of Aegyptus either by Eurryroe, daughter of the river-god Nilus, or Isaie, daughter of King Agenor of Tyre.

== Mythology ==
Diocorystes suffered the same fate as his other brothers, save Lynceus, when they were slain on their wedding night by their wives who obeyed the command of their father King Danaus of Libya. He married the Danaid Hippodamia, daughter of Danaus either by the hamadryads Atlanteia or Phoebe.
