= Oreius (mythology) =

Name in Greek mythology

In Greek mythology, Oreios, also Oreius, Orius or Oreus, (Ancient Greek: Ὀρείου, Ὄρειον or Ὄρειος, lit. 'of the mountain' or 'mountain-dwelling') may refer to the following personages:

- Oreius, father of Oxylus and Hamadryas, who, married to each other and became the parents of the hamadryads. He was probably a mountain-god of either Mount Othrys or Oita in Malis or else the Pindus mountain range.
- Orius, son of a bear and Polyphonte, and brother of Agrius. He was, like his brother, a powerful giant who did not honour the gods and who devoured men. He was turned into a bird by Hermes. (see Agrius and Oreius)
- Oreius, one of the centaurs who tried to steal the wine of Pholus and was killed by Heracles.
- Orius, son of Mycale and one of the Lapiths who fought against the Centaurs during the wedding of Pirithous and Hippodamia. He was killed by the centaur Gryneus who hurled a heavy blazing altar on him.
