= Agnete (mythology) =

Mothers of Meges

In Greek mythology, Agnete or Hagnete (Ancient Greek: Άγνήτης) was one of the supposed mothers of Meges, one of the Achaean Leaders, by King Phyleus of Dulichium, the son of King Augeas of Elis. Otherwise, she was called either Ctemene, Ctesimache, Eustyoche or Timandra. Hagnete might be the mother of Phyleus’ daughter Eurydameia who begot Euchenor and Cleitus by the seer Polyeidus.
