= Ctesimache =

In Greek mythology, Ctesimache (Ancient Greek: Κτησιμάχης Ktesimache) was one of the possible mothers of Meges, one of the Achaean Leaders, by King Phyleus of Dulichium, the son of King Augeas of Elis. Otherwise, she was called either Ctemene, Agnete, Eustyoche or Timandra.

Ctesimache is more likely a variation of Ctimene only. She might be the mother of Phyleus’ daughter Eurydameia who begot Euchenor and Cleitus by the seer Polyeidus.
