= Chalcodon =

Disambiguation article

In Greek mythology, the name Chalcodon (Ancient Greek: Χαλκώδων, romanized: Chalkṓdōn, lit. 'bronze-beaked') may refer to:

- Chalcodon, an Egyptian prince as one of the sons of King Aegyptus. He suffered the same fate as his other brothers, save Lynceus, when they were slain on their wedding night by their wives who obeyed the command of their father King Danaus of Libya. Chalcodon was the son of Aegyptus by an Arabian woman and thus full brother of Istrus, Agenor, Chaetus, Diocorystes, Alces, Alcmenor, Hippothous, Euchenor and Hippolytus. In some accounts, he could be a son of Aegyptus either by Eurryroe, daughter of the river-god Nilus, or Isaie, daughter of King Agenor of Tyre. Chalcodon married the Danaid Rhodia, daughter of Danaus either by the hamadryads Atlanteia or Phoebe.
- Chalcodon, the son of Abas and the king of the Abantes. He and Telamon assisted Heracles in his campaign against Elis. While leading his people in an attack on Thebes, Greece he was killed by Amphitryon. His son was Elephenor by either Imenarete, Melanippe or Alcyone. He also had several daughters, one of whom, Chalciope, married Aegeas.
- Chalcodon, a suitor of Hippodamia before Pelops, was killed by Oenomaus.
- Chalcodon, from Cyparissus. He was said to carry the arms of Antilochus, a participant in the Trojan War on the Greek side.
- Chalcodon, the king of Kos. He was the offspring of Clytia and Eurypylus, who was the child of the god Poseidon. Because of his descent from Poseidon, Chalcodon was said to be capable of splitting rocks. He wounded Heracles in a battle which arose when the Coans mistook Heracles for a pirate. Also known as Chalcon.

== See also ==
- Chalcon
