= Eustyoche =

In Greek mythology, Eustyoche was one of the reputed mothers of Meges, one of the Achaean Leaders, by King Phyleus of Dulichium, the son of King Augeas of Elis. Otherwise, she was called either Ctimene, Ctesimache, Hagnete or Timandra. Eustyoche might be the mother of Phyleus’ daughter Eurydameia who begot Euchenor and Cleitus by the seer Polyeidus.
