= Ctimene (mythology) =

In Greek mythology, Ctimene (/ˈtɪmɪni/; Ancient Greek: Κτιμένη, romanized: Ktiménē, Ancient Greek pronunciation: [ktiménɛː]) or Ctemene (Κτημένης Ktemene) may refer to two distinct women:

- Ctimene or Ctemene, mother of Meges, one of the Achaean Leaders, by King Phyleus of Dulichium, the son of King Augeas of Elis. Otherwise, the mother of Meges was called either Ctesimache, Agnete, Eustyoche or Timandra. Ctemene might be the mother of Phyleus’ daughter Eurydameia who begot Euchenor and Cleitus by the seer Polyeidus. This Ctimene may be the same below.
- Ctimene, daughter of Laertes and Anticlea, and younger sister of Odysseus.
