= Hippolytus (mythology) =

In Greek mythology, Hippolytus (Ancient Greek: Ἱππόλυτος, romanized: Hippolytos, lit. 'unleasher of horses', 'freer of horses' or 'letting horses loose') may refer to the following personages:

- Hippolytus, son of Theseus.
- Hippolytus, an Egyptian prince as one of the sons of King Aegyptus. He suffered the same fate as his other brothers, save Lynceus, when they were slain on their wedding night by their wives who obeyed the command of their father King Danaus of Libya. Hippolytus was the son of Aegyptus by an Arabian woman and thus full brother of Istrus, Chalcodon, Agenor, Chaetus, Diocorystes, Alces, Alcmenor, Hippothous and Euchenor. In some accounts, he could be a son of Aegyptus either by Eurryroe, daughter of the river-god Nilus, or Isaie, daughter of King Agenor of Tyre. Hippolytus married the Danaid Rhode (or, alternatively, Bebryce), daughter of Danaus either by the hamadryads Atlanteia or Phoebe.
- Hippolytus, one of the Gigantes, slain by Hermes who was wearing Hades's helmet of invisibility.
- Hippolytus, a lover of Aegiale, wife of Diomedes.
- Hippolytus, father of Deiphobus of Amyclae. The latter cleansed Heracles for the death of Iphitus.
- Hippolytus, successor to Zeuxippus as king of Sicyon, son of Rhopalus, grandson of Phaestus and father of Lacestades.
- Hippolytus of Sicyon, beloved of Apollo.
