= Hippothous =

Set of Greek mythological figures

In Greek mythology, Hippothous (Ancient Greek: Ἱππόθοος, romanized: Hippóthoos, lit. 'swift-riding') is the name of seven men:

- Hippothous, an Egyptian prince as one of the sons of King Aegyptus. He suffered the same fate as his other brothers, save Lynceus, when they were slain on their wedding night by their wives who obeyed the command of their father King Danaus of Libya. Hippothous was the son of Aegyptus by an Arabian woman and thus full brother of Istrus, Chalcodon, Agenor, Chaetus, Diocorystes, Alces, Alcmenor, Euchenor and Hippolytus. In some accounts, he could be a son of Aegyptus either by Eurryroe, daughter of the river-god Nilus, or Isaie, daughter of King Agenor of Tyre. Hippothous married the Danaid Gorge, daughter of Danaus either by the hamadryads Atlanteia or Phoebe.
- Hippothous, son of Poseidon and Alope, daughter of Cercyon. He was exposed and suckled by animals, while his mother was executed. After Theseus had killed Cercyon he willingly handed over his kingdom to Hippothous, since both men were the sons of Poseidon. Also known as Hippothoon.
- Hippothous, son of Cercyon. He was one of the hunters of the Calydonian Boar. He later inherited the kingdom of Arcadia when king Agapenor did not return from the Trojan War. His successor was his son, Aepytus.
- Hippothous, son of Neaera, daughter of Autolycus. He was killed by Telephus his kinsman (he was the son of Auge).
- Hippothous, son of Hippocoon. He was killed, along with father and brothers, by Heracles.
- Hippothous, one of the sons of Priam.
- Hippothous, son of Lethus, the son of Teutamides, a descendant of Pelasgus. He led the contingent of the Pelasgians during the Trojan War, along with his brother Pylaeus, and was killed by Ajax during the fight over the body of Patroclus.
