= Eurydameia =

In Greek mythology, Eurydameia (Ancient Greek: Εὐρυδάμειαν) was the daughter of King Phyleus of Dulichium, son of King Augeas of Elis.

== Mythology ==
Eurydameia was the mother of the seer Polyidus’ children: Euchenor and Cleitus, and possibly of Coeranus, Astycrateia and Manto. As a daughter of Phyleus, her probable mothers were Eustyoche, Ctimene, Ctesimache, Hagnete, or Timandra and thus, a (half-)sister of Meges, one of the Achaean Leaders during the Trojan War.
