= Agrius =

Name of figures in Greek mythology

Agrius (/ˈæɡriəs/; Ancient Greek: Ἄγριος, romanized: Agrios, lit. 'wild' or 'savage') in Greek mythology, is a name that may refer to:

- Agrius, one of the Giants, sons of Gaia. He, together with Thoon, was clubbed to death by Moirai with maces made from bronze, during the Gigantomachy, the battle of the Giants versus the Olympian gods.
- Agrius, son of King Porthaon of Calydon.
- Agrius, son of Polyphonte and a bear. He was the twin brother of Oreius. (see Agrius and Oreius)
- Agrius, one of the centaurs with whom Heracles fought.
- Agrius, son of Odysseus by Circe and a brother of Latinus and Telegonus, mentioned only in Hesiod's Theogony.
- Agrius, one of the Suitors of Penelope who came from Dulichium along with either 56 other wooers (according to Apollodorus), or 51 (according to Homer). He, with the other suitors, was slain by Odysseus with the aid of Eumaeus, Philoetius, and Telemachus.
- Agrius, one of Actaeon's dogs.

The city of Agrinio, the largest city in Aetolia, took its name from Agrius.
