= Ornytus =

In Greek mythology, the name Ornytus (Ancient Greek: Ὄρνυτος) may refer to:

- Ornytus or Ornytion, son of Sisyphus.
- Ornytus or Ornytion, grandson of the above, father of Naubolus.
- Ornytus, or Teuthis, leader of the army that came from Teuthis to join in the campaign against Troy.
- Ornytus, a Bebrycian briefly mentioned in the Argonautica: he helps Amycus to put his gauntlets on for the boxing match with Polydeuces.
- Ornytus, a Dolonian killed by Idmon.
- Ornytus, a soldier who fought under Aeneas and was killed by Camilla.
- Ornytus, a soldier who fought with the Seven against Thebes, and survived the war.
- Ornytus, the man believed to have led a colony in Caria together with Ioxus, son of Melanippus (the son of Theseus and Perigune).
