= Chrysopeleia =

Figure in Greek mythology

In Greek mythology, Chrysopeleia (/ˌkrɪsoʊpɪˈliːə/; Ancient Greek: Χρυσοπέλεια, romanized: Khrusopéleia, lit. 'golden pigeon') was a hamadryad nymph.

== Mythology ==
The most prolonged account of her is given in John Tzetzes' scholia on Lycophron, and runs as follows. The tree in which Chrysopeleia dwelt was put in danger by the waters of a flooding river. She was rescued by Arcas, who happened to be hunting in the neighborhood: he rerouted the river and secured the tree with a dam. Chrysopeleia became his lover and bore him two sons, Apheidas and Elatus.

A nymph named Chrysopeleia is also mentioned by the mythographer Apollodorus as one of the possible spouses of Arcas.

== See also ==
Other men related to stories about a nymph and her tree:

- Paraebius
- Rhoecus
- Erysichthon of Thessaly
