= Pherenicus =

Ancient Greek epic poet

Pherenicus (Greek: Φερένικος) was an epic poet from Heraclea Pontica. He treated of Metamorphoses and similar fabulous tales. Athenaeus attributes to him the statement that the daughters of Hamadryas and Oxylus were various hamadryad nymphs, associated with different types of trees. Tzetzes speaks of him as one of those who treated of the monstrous and fabulous forms of men, and quotes from him two lines respecting the Hyperboreans.
