= Meges =

Trojan War commander

In Greek mythology, Mégês Phyleïdês (Ancient Greek: Μέγης Φυλεΐδης) was the commander of Epeans and/or Dulichians during the Trojan War.

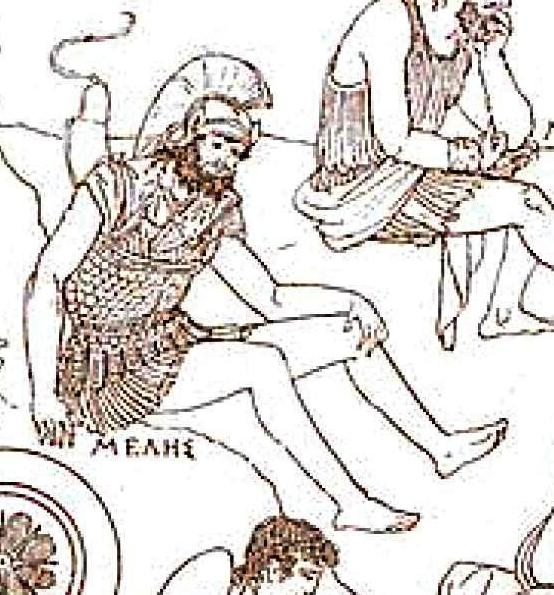
Art Illustration depicting Meges

== Family ==
Meges was the son of King Phyleus of Dulichium and his mother's name is variously given as either Eustyoche, Ctimene, Ctesimache, Hagnete or Timandra.

Meges’ (half-)sister was Eurydameia, mother of Cleitus and Euchenor by the seer Polyidus of Corinth.

== Mythology ==
Meges was one of the suitors of Helen, and commanded the armies of the Echinadians and the Dulichians during the Trojan War, having summoned forty or sixty ships; he also led a contingent of Epeans who had once migrated to Dulichium together with his father.

Meges was credited with killing a number of opponents, including Pedaeus (a son of Antenor), Croesmus, Amphiclus, Itymoneus, Agelaus, Eurymenes, and Deiopites. Dolops attempted to strike him with a spear but the corselet Meges was wearing, a gift for his father from Euphetes of Ephyra, saved his life. Meges helped Odysseus to collect gifts for Achilles. He was one of the men to enter the Trojan Horse.

According to Dictys Cretensis, Meges fell at Troy. Pausanias mentions a painting of him wounded in the arm by a Trojan, Admetus the son of Augeas, during the fall of the city. Tzetzes relates that Meges, along with Prothous and a number of others, perished at Euboea.
