= Astycrateia =

Several characters in Greek mythology

Astycrateia, also Astycratea, Astycratia or Astykrateia (Ancient Greek: Ἀστυκράτεια), in Greek mythology, may refer to:

- Astycrateia, daughter of the seer Polyeidos and sister of Manto and Coeranus. Her possible mother was Eurydameia, daughter of King Phyleus of Dulichium, therefore can be considered the sister of Euchenor and Cleitus.
- Astycrateia, one of the Niobids.
- Astycrateia, daughter of Aeolus and Telepora or Telepatra, daughter of Laestrygon. She was the sister of Androcles, Chrysippus, Iocastus, Phalacrus, Pheraemon, Xuthus, and the daughters' as Aeole, Dia, Hephaestia, Iphthe and Periboea.

== Media ==
- A terracotta figurine is shown in the MAK Collection Online: Inventory number: MAK, KE 1218-7
- 3D-Model of the same figurine: Sketchfab: Astykratia (Niobe) Figure from the MAK
