= Rhodia (mythology) =

In Greek mythology, Rhodia or Rhodeia (Ancient Greek: Ῥοδία or Ῥόδεια, romanized: Rhodía, lit. 'rose' or 'woman from the island of Rhodes') may refer to the following characters:

- Rhodea, one of the 3,000 Oceanid water-nymphs, daughters of the Titans Oceanus and Tethys. She was one of the companions of Persephone along with her sisters when the daughter of Demeter, while gathering flowers in the meadow, was abducted by Hades.
- Rhodia, one of the seven Muses who were daughters of Pieros and a Pimpleian nymph. She was the sister of Neilo, Tritone, Asopo, Heptapore, Achelois and Tipoplous.
- Rhodia, one of the 50 Danaïdes, daughters of Danaus, king of Libya (and later of Argos) either by the hamadryads Atlanteia or Phoebe. On the orders of her father, she married and murdered her cousin–husband Chalcodon, son of King Aegyptus of Egypt by an Arabian woman.
- Rhodia, a minor figure depicted in ancient Attic black-figure pottery (specifically the famous François Vase, c. 570 BCE). She is shown as an onlooker with her hands raised in alarm during Achilles' ambush of Troilos at the fountain house.
