= Teuthis (mythology) =

Arcadian king in Greek mythology

In Greek mythology, Teuthis (Ancient Greek: Τεῦθις, romanized: Teûthis), also called Ornytus (Ancient Greek: Ὄρνυτος, romanized: Órnutos) is an Arcadian general from the city-state of Teuthis in the Peloponnese, southern Greece. Although not appearing in Homeric works, Teuthis is one of the Achaean leaders who gathered their armies to wage war against Troy in order to retrieve Helen, the queen of Sparta. Unlike the other Greek kings, Teuthis abandoned the war early when the armies were stuck at the port of Aulis and returned home, only to be severely punished by the goddess Athena for disrespecting her.

== Mythology ==
Teuthis was a general of the Teuthians from Arcadia, a region in the Peloponnese. Like many other Greek leaders, he and his soldiers joined the expendition to take Helen from Troy and deliver her back to her husband Menelaus. According to Malalas, he led 60 ships together with another general named Agenor.

The Greeks were stationed at Aulis for a very long time because, when Agamemnon boasted that he was a better hunter than the goddess Artemis, she was angry at him and commanded the winds to prevent them from moving forward. Furious, Teuthis quarrelled badly with Agamemnon, king of kings, and prepared to return home to Teuthis with his soldiers. Then the goddess Athena appeared to him in the disguise of Melas and pursued him to stay. But Teuthis in his anger, and not realising this was a goddess before him, hurled his spear against her and wounded her in the thigh.

He then returned home with his army, but Athena did not forget the insult; she sent a dream to him where she appeared with a wound on her thigh, and soon Teuthis was suffering from a terrible wasting disease, and the Teuthians alone among all Arcadians suffered from famine. According to Tzetzes, Teuthis died in his homeland. Eventually the people received an oracle from Dodona, in which they was instructed to appease the goddess by crafting a statue of her with her wounded thigh swathed in a purple bandage. After the statue was made, Athena stopped the famine.

== See also ==
Other punishments in Greek myth include:

- Evenius
- Paraebius
- Erysichthon of Thessaly
- Phalanx
- Rhoecus of Cnidus

== Bibliography ==
- Avery, Catherine B., ed. (1962). New Century Classical Handbook. New York, US: Appleton-Century-Crofts.
- Grimal, Pierre (1987). The Dictionary of Classical Mythology. Wiley-Blackwell. ISBN 0-631-13209-0.
- Pausanias, Pausanias Description of Greece with an English Translation by W.H.S. Jones, Litt.D., and H.A. Ormerod, M.A., in 4 Volumes. Cambridge, MA, Harvard University Press; London, William Heinemann Ltd. 1918. Online version at the Perseus Digital Library.
