= Agenor (mythology) =

Several Greek mythological figures

Agenor (/əˈdʒiːnɔːr/; Ancient Greek: Ἀγήνωρ or Αγήνορι, romanized: Agēnor, lit. 'heroic, manly') was the name of the following Greek mythological characters:

- Agenor, son of Poseidon and king of Tyre.
- Agenor of Argos, son of either Ecbasus, Triopas, or Phoroneus.
- Agenor, an Egyptian prince as one of the sons of King Aegyptus. He married the Danaid Cleopatra, daughter of King Danaus of Libya either by the hamadryads Atlanteia or Phoebe. Agenor was killed along with his brothers, except Lynceus, by their wives during their wedding night at the behest of their father. Agenor was the son of Aegyptus by an Arabian woman and thus full brother of Istrus, Chalcodon, Chaetus, Diocorystes, Alces, Alcmenor, Hippothous, Euchenor and Hippolytus. In some accounts, he could be a son of Aegyptus either by Eurryroe, daughter of the river-god Nilus, or Isaie, daughter of King Agenor of Tyre.
- Agenor, the betrothed of Andromeda, otherwise called Phineus.
- Agenor, son of King Pleuron and grandson of Aetolus.
- Agenor, one of the Niobids.
- Agenor, a warrior in the army of the Seven against Thebes. For trying to rescue Tages, his brother, who had been wounded in battle by Hypseus in the river, Agenor eventually was drowned.
- Agenor, son of Phegeus and murderer of Alcmaeon.
- Agenor, son of Antenor and a character in Homer's Iliad.
- Agenor, one of the sons of King Aeolus of Lipara, the keeper of the winds. He had five brothers namely: Periphas, Euchenor, Klymenos, Xouthos and Macareus, and six sisters: Klymene, Kallithyia, Eurygone, Lysidike, Kanake and an unnamed one. According to various accounts, Aeolus yoked in marriage his sons, including Agenor, and daughters in order to preserve concord and affection among them.
- Agenor, one of the Suitors of Penelope who came from Dulichium along with either 56 other wooers (according to Apollodorus), or 51 (according to Homer). Euryalus, with the other suitors, was slain by Odysseus with the aid of Eumaeus, Philoetius, and Telemachus.
- Agenor, also one of the Suitors of Penelope from Zacynthus with other 43 wooers. He suffered the same fate as his above namesake.
- Agenor, son Areus, son of Ampyx. He was the father of Preugenes and paternal grandfather of Patreus, the founder of Patrae.
- Agenor, husband of Dioxippe and father of Sipylus, who unwittingly killed his mother.
