= Hippomedusa =

In Greek mythology, Hippomedusa or Hippomedousa (Ancient Greek: Ἱππομέδουσα, lit. 'governess of horses' or 'queen of horses') may refer to two distinct women:

- Hippomedusa, one of the 50 Danaids, daughters of King Danaus of Libya (and later of Argos) either by the hamadryads Atlanteia or Phoebe. Like most of her sisters, she took part in the mass wedding to the sons of Aegyptus and murdered her cousin-husband, Alcmenor, on their wedding night on the orders of her father.
- Hippomedusa, in an obscure, localized variant tradition of the Theban cycle, was named as the wife of King Amphion of Thebes. Usually, the latter's wife was famoulsy known as Niobe, duaghter of Tantalus.
