= Theisoa (Orchomenus) =

Town in ancient Arcadia

Coordinates: 37°38′11″N 22°05′14″E

Theisoa (Ancient Greek: Θεισόα) was a town of ancient Arcadia, in the territory of Orchomenus. It is mentioned along with Methydrium and Teuthis as belonging to the confederation (συντέλεια) of Orchomenos. Its inhabitants were removed to Megalopolis upon the foundation of the latter city (371 BCE).

Its site is located near the modern Karkalous.
