= Euphetes =

King from Ephyre in Greek mythology

In Greek mythology, Euphetes (Ancient Greek: Εὐφήτης) was the king from Ephyre (a place near the river Selleis in Elis).

== Mythology ==
Euphetes received Phyleus and gave him a corselet as a present, which later saved Meges' life at Troy.

But his (i.e. Meges) cunningly-wrought corselet saved him, the corselet that he was wont to wear, fitted with plates of mail. This Phyleus had brought from out of Ephyre, from the river Seleïs. For a guest-friend of his, the king of men Euphetes, had given it him that he might wear it in war, a defence against foe-men; and this now warded death from the body of his son.
