= Imenarete =

According to the Roman author Hyginus, Imenarete was the mother of Elephenor, one of the Achaean leaders, by Chalcodon. In some accounts, the spouse of Chalcodon was called Melanippe or Alcyone.
