= Coeranus (mythology) =

Disambiguation article

In Greek mythology, the name Coeranus /ˈsɛrənəs/ or Koiranos (Ancient Greek: Κοίρανος "ruler, commander") may refer to:

- Coeranus, an Argive son of Abas, grandson of Melampus, and father of the seer Polyeidos. Alternately, was called son of Cleitus.
- Coeranus, son of Polyeidos (thus grandson of the precedent), brother of Manto and Astycrateia. His own son Euchenor dedicated an image of Dionysus Dasyllius to the god at Megara.
- Coeranus, a Lycian soldier, son of Iphitus, who followed their leader, Sarpedon, to fight in the Trojan War. He was slain by the Greek hero Odysseus during the siege of Troy.
- Coeranus, a native of Lyctus in Crete, charioteer and squire of Meriones. He was slain by Hector.
