= Phalanthum =

Phalanthum or Phalanthon (Ancient Greek: Φάλανθον), also known as Phalanthus or Phalanthos (Φάλανθος), was a town of ancient Arcadia, in the district Orchomenia, near Methydrium, situated upon a mountain of the same name. Its site is unlocated.
