= Elephenor =

In Greek mythology, king of the Abantes

In Greek mythology, Elephenor /ˌɛlɪˈfiːnər, -ˌnɔːr/ (Ancient Greek: Ἐλεφήνωρ, -ορος Elephḗnōr, -oros) was the king of the Abantes of Euboea.

== Family ==
Elephenor was the son of Chalcodon by either Imenarete, Melanippe or Alcyone.

== Mythology ==
Elephenor received the sons of Theseus of Athens, Acamas and Demophon, when they fled from the usurper Menestheus. They later accompanied him to Troy.

One source states that he unwittingly killed his grandfather Abas and was expelled from Euboea; because of that, he had to assemble his troops before the Trojan expedition on a rock of the Euripus Strait opposite Euboea. Elephenor also purified Poemander of the murder of Leucippus.

=== Trojan War ===
Elephenor was a suitor of Helen and the leader of the Euboean force of thirty or forty ships which joined the Greek expedition to Troy. On the day the truce was broken by Pandarus, he was killed by Agenor whilst trying to drag off the body of Echepolus.

=== The return ===
On their way home, Elephenor's men were driven off course and shipwrecked off the coast of Epirus, where they founded the city of Apollonia. Alternately, Elephenor survived and settled on the island Othronos, but was soon driven out of the island by a serpent and went to Abantia in Illyria.
