= Hamadryas =

Hamadryas is a nymph, the mother of the hamadryads in Greek mythology, and the name has been used repeatedly in scientific naming and may refer to:

Genera

- Hamadryas (butterfly), a genus of brush-footed butterflies
- Hamadryas (plant), a genus of plants

Species epithet

- The hamadryas baboon, Papio hamadryas

Rejected scientific names

- As a proposed (but rejected) generic name for the king cobra, a snake
- As a junior synonym generic name for the Tellervini, milkweed butterflies
- As a junior synonym generic name for the owl butterfly, genus Caligo, a group of butterflies with large spots
- As a junior synonym generic name for a proposed monotypic genus for Euclemensia woodiella, a rare British moth
- As a junior synonym species epithet for the lung breathing snail Bulimus eurystomus
