= Bears in antiquity =

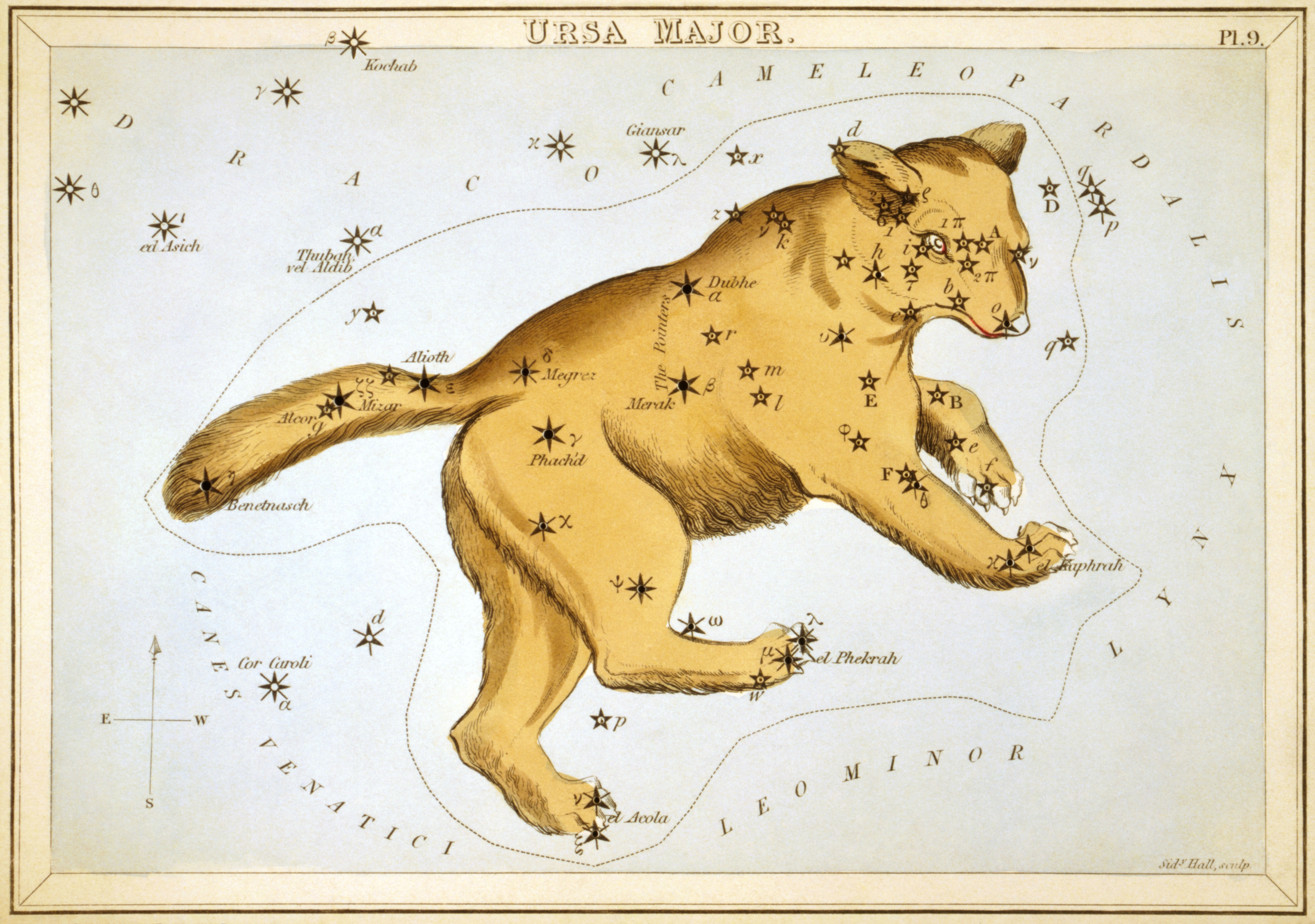
The constellation of Ursa Major

Bears in antiquity had natural observations recorded about them from as the early as Classical Greece, and were part of most natural histories that followed. One knows from Pausanias that bears roamed ancient Greece, and archaeological evidence found such as bear teeth attest to his witness. Natural Histories that studied bears were recorded by Aristotle, Aelian, Pliny and Oppian and were probably based on their first hand accounts or the testimony of hunters. Bears came to represent a state between wild and tame, and were represented as such in cultural appropriations. The image of the bear was also commercialised in trade, as were its body parts.

== Natural Histories ==
=== The anatomy ===
Aristotle describes the erect posture of bears [HA 2.17 507b], the quality of having a single stomach like humans [HA 2.17 507b] and the fact that like men they have paws with five fingers and three finger joints [HA 2.1]. Oppian also describes the physical parallels between man and bear in his more complete description of the bear;

"clothed in a close and rugged coat of hair and a form unkindly with unsmiling eyes. Sawtoothed, deadly, and long is their mouth; nose dark, eye keen, ankle swift, body nimble, head broad, hand like the hands of men, feet like men's feet." [C. 3.139-45]

Most other natural histories are similar, however, some deviations can be found. Pliny describes the male bear as "remarkably fat" rather than 'nimble,' and to be "dull" rather than 'keen' cited [NH. 8.54].

=== Childbirth ===
The procreation of bears was described by most naturalists, as it was perceived to be unique among all animals. Aristotle wrote that bears mated by lying down and embracing [HA. 579a20] before the she-bear delivers incomplete offspring [GA. 744b5-16]. Pliny adds that this took place in winter before the she-bear goes to a separate den from the male bear, and commonly gives birth to five shapeless objects. These objects are marginally bigger than mice with claws, and grow into bears over the four months that the she-bear spends in hibernation [NH. 8.54]. Aelian records that the shapeless object is loved and recognised by the she-bear, and licked into shape [NA. 2.19]. However, while Aelian states that this is because the she-bear is "unable to produce a cub", Pseudo-Oppian attributes the shapeless offspring to the she-bear's insatiable "desire for mating", stating that the cub is forced out undeveloped so as "not to have her bed widowed" [C. 3.150-160]. Finally, Aelian records that the male bear reportedly sleeps for forty days, and for these days sucking on his paw is enough for him to be nourished [NA. 6.3].

=== Behaviour ===
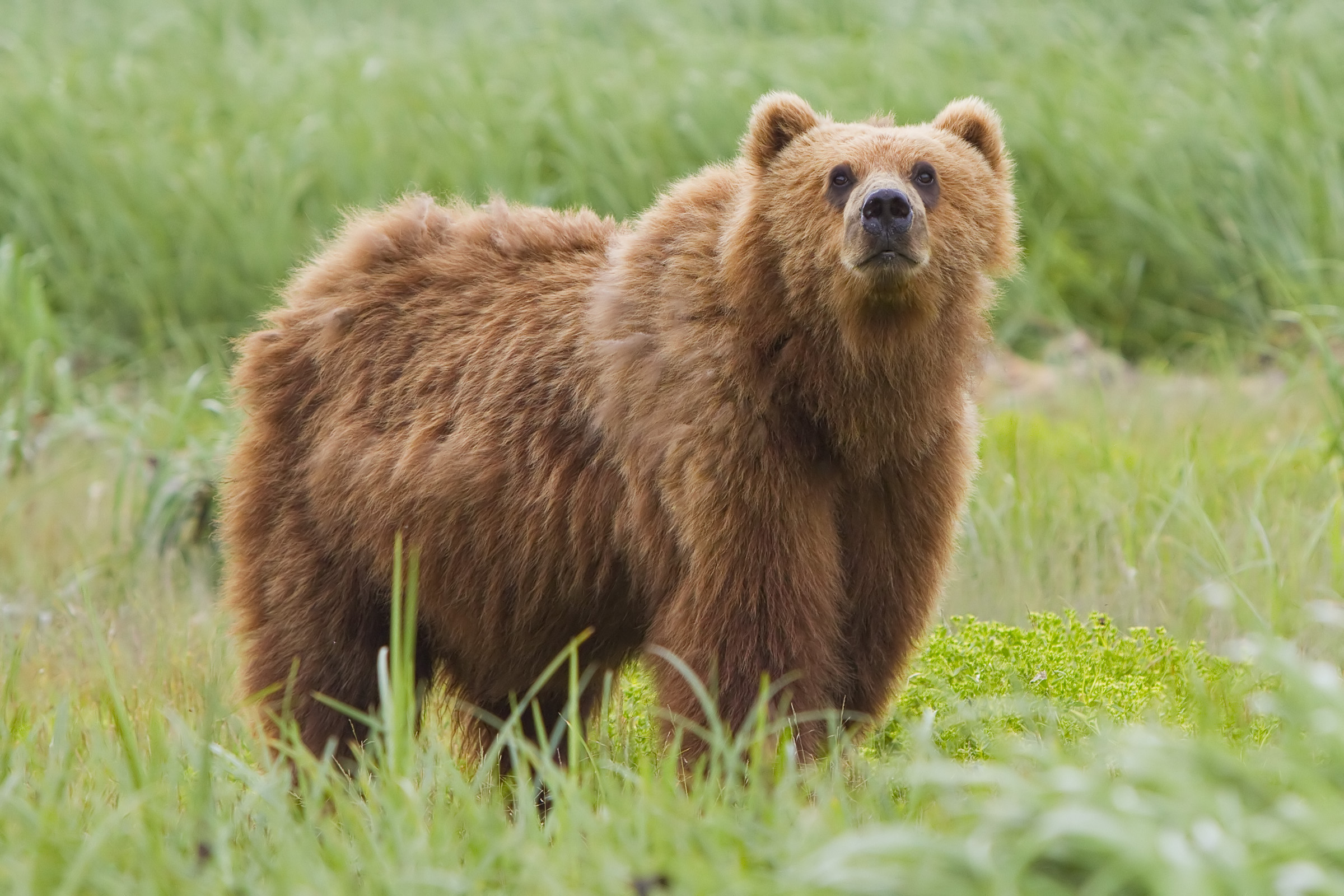

Natural histories in antiquity focused mainly on the behavioural traits of bears and put forward reasons for these.

Tricks against Prey

Aelian observed that when a bear preys on a bull, instead of fighting it head-on, it wrestles with it before putting it in a head-lock and bellowing until the bull is dead [NA. 6.9]. Pliny also describes this tactic, clarifying that it is made possible by the bear's weight [NH. 8.54]. Aelian also notes that when being preyed upon, the bear cleverly has its cubs run as far as they can before carrying them to first exhaust their energy [NA. 6.9].

Eating Habits

Pliny observed the bear habit of eating a plant known as the Aros and put forward to explanations for this. Firstly, it was to relax their bowels and avoid constipation (presumably from being in hibernation for so long). The second reason was that the roots of the plant sharpened the bears' teeth [NH. 8.54]. Pliny also describes the bears seeking of honeycombs. Pliny states this is because bears have poor eyesight that causes oppression in the head, which is relieved by bees attacking the neck [NH. 8.54].

General Observations

Pliny states that the bear first covers its head with its paws in defence, due to it having a fragile head [NH. 8.54]. Oppian observes how the bear acts when being hunted. The bear is described to "rage with jaws and terrible jaws" and to sometimes be able to break free of the net being used to try to capture it [C. 410-420].

=== Philosophical Conclusions ===
Both the bear's likeness to humans and their role in child-bearing, lead them to be a philosophical symbol of the antithesis between man and beast, and between maiden and mother. On the significance of standing erect, Aristotle wrote;

"Man is the only animal that stands upright, and this is because his nature and essence is divine. Now the business of that which is most divine is to think and to be intelligent..." PA 4.10 (686a26-28)

While on the significance of having hands, Aristotle stated;

"Anaxagoras indeed asserts that it is his possession of hands that makes man the most intelligent of the animals; but surely the reasonable point of view is that it is because he is the most intelligent animal that he has got hands." PA 4.10 (687a17-20)

Aristotle was not the only one to draw significance from such attributes. Xenophon remarked that man's upright posture allowed men alone to view things a distance away [Xen. Mem. 1.4.11], while Ovid stated it meant man could see the stars [Ov. Met. 1.75]. Aristotle quotes the Greek philosopher Anaxagoras as viewing hands as the source of intelligence. The fact that bears were observed to share these traits with humans somewhat, meant that in the ancient Greek psyche, they were viewed differently to other animals. Bears were also seen as divine mothers, evidenced by Porphyrius' Life of Pythagoras, which quotes the ancient mathematician as saying that the she-bear constellation was "the hand of Rhea" [pyth. 41]. Modern historians interpreting how bears were viewed in antiquity have commented the following:

"The bear and the she-bear mark distinctively the rites of passage through which maidens become women." - Laura Cherubini "The semi-human aspects of the bear make it an ideal symbol of Artemis' function in the rituals of Attica, namely as a figure on the margin between wildness/virginity and tameness/wifehood." - Thomas F. Scanlon

== Cultural presence ==
=== Myth ===
Bears made various appearances in the mythology of the Greeks, and their appearance was often related with their perception of being a good child-bearer.

Kallisto

The myth of Kallisto was famous throughout antiquity and retold by many ancient writers. The oldest of these comes from Hesiod. Hesiod wrote that Kallisto was a princess, daughter of the King Lykaon. She roamed the forests with Artemis and swore that she would remain a virgin to the goddess. However, when Artemis discovered that Zeus had indeed seduced Kallisto, she turned her into a bear. Kallisto gave birth to a boy named Arkas who was taken by goat-herds. One day, Kallisto was hunted by her son, who didn't recognise her, when Zeus intervened and placed Kallisto among the stars, and named her Arktos (meaning bear) [Hesiod The Astronomy Fragment 3]. There are various alternate versions. Pausanias states that Hera turned Kallisto into a bear and Artemis shot her, before Hermes rescued Arkas and Zeus placed Kallisto among the stars [Description of Greece 8. 3. 6]. Yet another version is preserved by Pseudo-Apollodorus who wrote that it was Zeus who turned Kallisto into the bear, in order to hide her from Hera [Bibliotheca 3. 100].

Child-Birth Myth

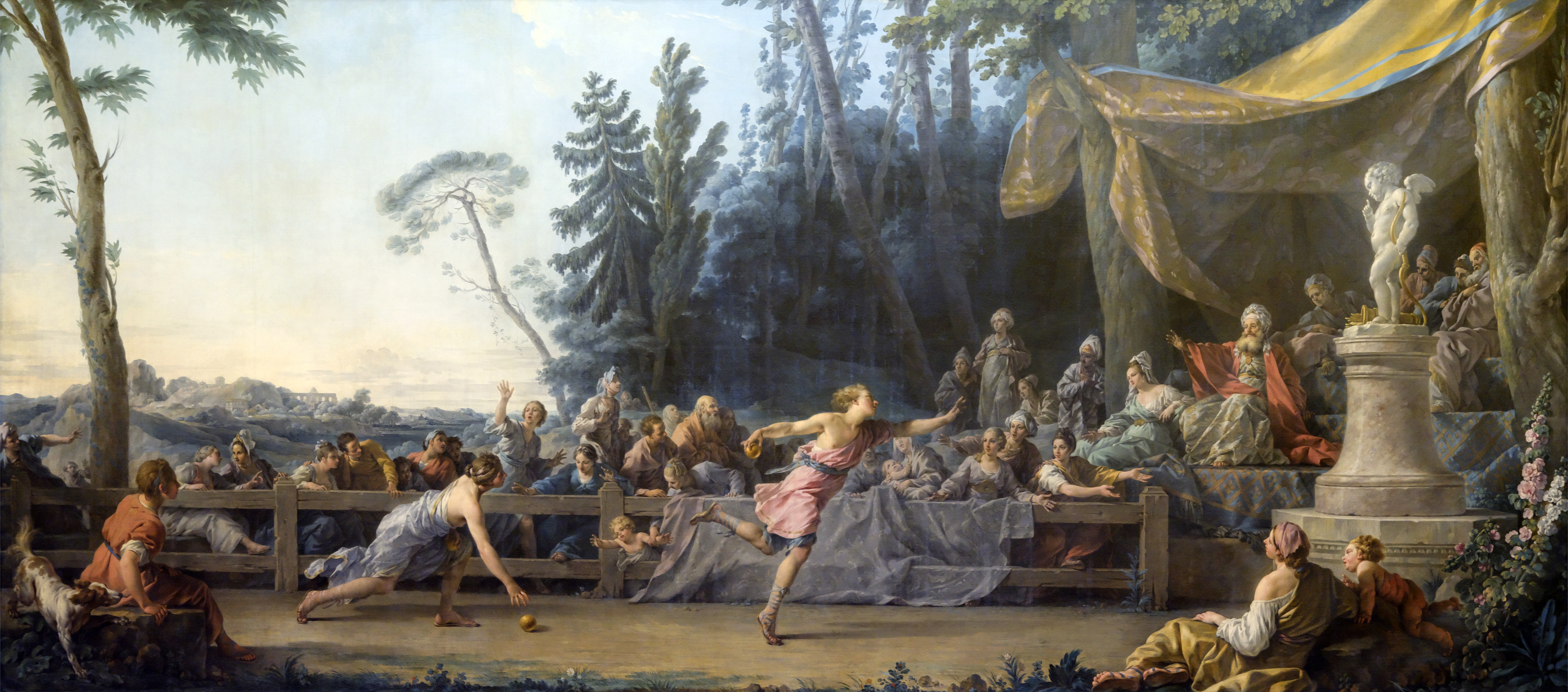
The Race Between Hippomenes and Atalanta by Noël Hallé, 1765

The bear is also involved in myths involving the rearing of children. Two very famous gods were recorded in antiquity to have been suckled by a she-bear.

Atalanta, famous for a favourite of Artemis and a female hero, was abandoned by her father who had hoped for male offspring. Pseudo-Apollodorus recorded that upon being exposed, a she-bear came and gave her suck until hunters found her. [Bibliotheca 3. 9. 2] Aelian describes a very similar tradition, however, gives the bear more humanistic characteristics. Aelian, after establishing that the bear was a mother who had lost her children because of hunters, details the toil and pain of being "weighed down with milk" and the "relief" the bear felt when giving suck to Atalanta. [Historical Miscellany 13. 1].

Zeus also is recorded to have been suckled by bears when brought to Crete. Aratus wrote that Ursa Major and Ursa Minor suckled the young child. Ursa Major and Ursa Minor were the names given to Kallisto and her child when placed among the starts, and so this myth appears to have a differing chronology to other myths.

Polyphonte

Antoninus Liberalis wrote that Polyphonte was from the line of Ares and was a companion of Artemis. Polyphonte had no regard for the activities of Aphrodite. As punishment for scorning her doings, Aphrodite led Polyphonte to fall in love with a bear. Unable to resist the desires instilled within her by Aphrodite, Polyphonte came to sleep with the bear. Disgusted, Artemis had all the beasts attack Polyphonte and drive her out of the mountains wherein they dwelt. Polyphonte took refuge at her father's

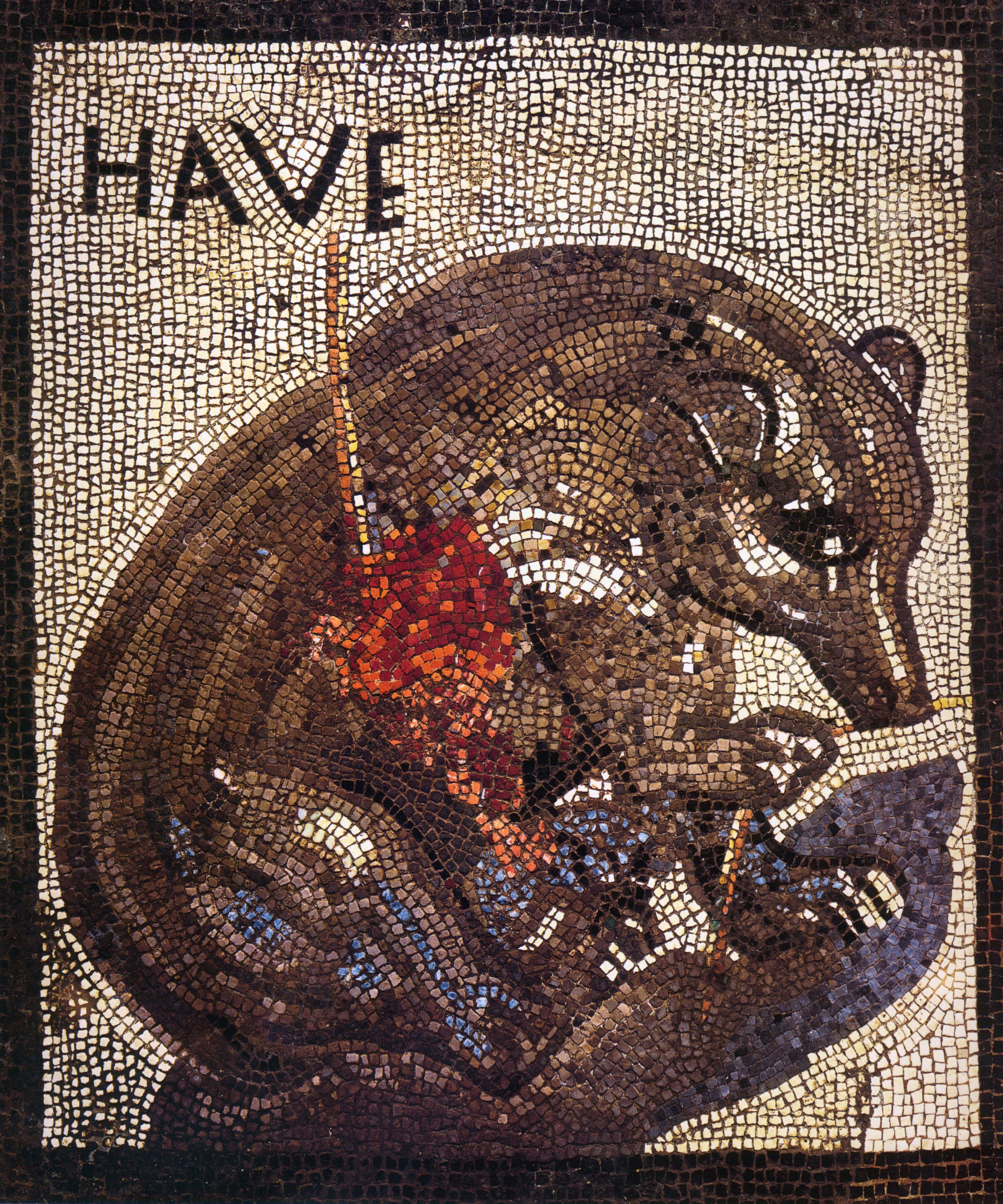
Mosaic of a Bear in Pompeii (Reg VII, Ins 2, 45)

house and gave birth to two giant, half-bear and half-man creatures. Zeus hated the children so sent Hermes to punish them, however, Ares persuaded Hermes to only turn the creatures and Polyphonte into birds. Polyphonte became a small owl, and her children became an eagle owl and vulture. [Metamorphoses. 21]

Folktale Myth

Some folktales were spread about the bear in antiquity. For example, Aristotle records that Kephalos, the great-grandfather of Odysseus, consulted an oracle when he desired a child. Kephalos was instructed that his firstborn's mother would be the first woman he encountered after leaving the shrine of Apollo. The first woman that Kephalos met was a she-bear, and so in accordance with the oracle he had received, he slept with the bear who subsequently was transformed into a woman and bore him the child Arkeisios [Aristotle, Frg. 504 (rose)]. Another example comes from Aelian, who recorded a story called "A Lion, a Bear, and a Dog". The story is told about a young man who was a hunter and lived with wild animals. For a while, the hunter managed to tame the animals and live with them in harmony. Then, one day the dog was making fun of the bear when, with no warning, the bear clawed the dog and tore open its stomach. The lion was disgusted with the actions of the bear, and so responded by attacking the bear in the same way the bear attacked the dog [Aelian, On Animals, 4.45].

=== Art ===
The bear was a recurring image within the artworks of antiquity:

The Bear in Ancient Artworks at the Getty Museum
Title	Culture	Place	Date	Type	Getty Object Number	Artist	Description
Statue of a Bear	Roman	Roman Empire	AD. 100-125	Marble	72.AA.125	Unknown	A life-size marble statue of a bear climbing a rock. The piece is speculated to have originally been part of a larger work that also included a party hunting the bear.
Mosaic Floor Panel	Roman	"Stufe di Nerone", near Lago Lucrino, near Pozzuoli, Italy	AD. 4th century	Stone tesserae	72.AH.76.9	Unknown	Part of a larger mosaic, depicting a bear hunt. This panel shows two bears fleeing, with a net thrown out in front of them.
Mosaic Floor Panel	Roman	"Stufe di Nerone", near Lago Lucrino, near Pozzuoli, Italy	AD. 4th century	Stone tesserae	72.AH.76.12	Unknown	Also part of the bear hunt mosaic. This panel shows a bear with its mouth wide open, crying out as it is chased by hunters.
Apulian Red-Figure Chous	Greek	Apulia, South Italy	BC. 360 circa.	Terracotta	72.AE.128	Attributed to near the Black Fury Group	A chous depicting Kallisto transforming into a bear. Kallisto is seated upon a rock, looking down upon her changing body. Bear fur has grown upon her arms, her fingers have started to resemble claws and her ears have become pointed like those of animals.

=== Religion ===
The Bear was an animal sacred to Artemis. Bears played a role in a prominent cult to Artemis at Brauron. Aristophanes recorded in his Lysistrata that young girls would "act the she-bear" for Artemis [Aristophanes, Lysistrata, 641-47]. This has been interpreted by modern scholars as a rite of passage for young maidens who were maturing into a stage of motherhood. The reason for this was recorded by the scholia, which told a story about a bear injuring a maiden playmate. The maidens brothers killed the bear in rage, and in response. The oracle at Delphi then told the Athenian maidens that from then onwards, they must "act the she-bear". Archaeological evidence includes hundreds of black figure kraters that depict girls running foot-races and dancing, activities that were probably considered to be 'acting the she-bear' at the festival. Architectural remains at the sanctuary site of Brauron included rows of small rooms built into a cave shelter, and date back to the 7th century BC. These have been suggested by modern scholars to mean that young girls would pretend to go into hibernation, like the she-bear, and emerge mature, as part of their worship to Artemis.

== See also ==
- Bear in heraldry
- Bears in mythology
- Bear worship
