= Cleopatra (Danaid) =

Cleopatra (Ancient Greek: Κλεοπάτρα, romanized: Kleopátra, lit. 'glory of the father') in Greek mythology was the name of two Danaides of altogether 50 daughters of Danaus sired with different women. Each of the two Cleopatras married – like all their sisters – one of the 50 sons of Danaus’ twin brother Aegyptus. One Cleopatra, whose mother was a hamadryad (Atlantia or Phoebe), married Agenor, and the other Cleopatra, the daughter of the naiad Polyxo, married Hermus. Like all Danaides – except Hypermnestra – both Cleopatras killed their husbands on their wedding night.
