= Deiphobus (mythology) =

In Greek mythology, Deiphobus (/diːˈɪfəbəs/; Ancient Greek: Δηΐφοβος, romanized: Dēḯphobos, lit. 'hostile', 'panicky flight' or 'dreaded by the enemy') may refer to two distinct characters:

- Deiphobus, a Trojan prince as son of King Priam and Queen Hecabe, who was next to Hector the bravest among the Trojans.
- Deiphobus, son of Hippolytus of Amyclae who purified Heracles for the murder of Iphitus.
