= Preugenes =

Preugenes (Ancient Greek: Πρευγένης) was a mythical king of Achaea in Greece. He was a descendant of King Lacedaemon of Sparta, and the son of Agenor. Preugenes was the father of Patreus who founded the city of Patras.
