= Admetus (son of Augeas) =

In Greek mythology, Admetus (/ædˈmiːtəs/; Ancient Greek: Ἄδμητος, lit. 'untameable') was a Trojan warrior and son of Augeas. On the night of the fall of Troy, he wounded the Greek hero Meges in the arm, but was later killed by Philoctetes.
