= Cercyon =

Name of multiple Greek mythological figures

In Greek mythology, Cercyon (Ancient Greek: Κερκύων, romanized: Kerkýōn) was the name of the following two figures:

- Cercyon, malefactor who was killed by Theseus.
- Cercyon, son of Agamedes and father of Hippothous according to Pausanias.
