= Deiopites =

Greek mythology figure

In Greek mythology, Deiopites (Ancient Greek: Δηιοπίτης) was a Trojan prince as one of the children of King Priam of Troy by an unknown woman. He was killed by the Cretan leader Meges during the siege of the city.
