= Teuthis =

Ancient city in Greece

Coordinates: 37°35′52″N 22°02′16″E

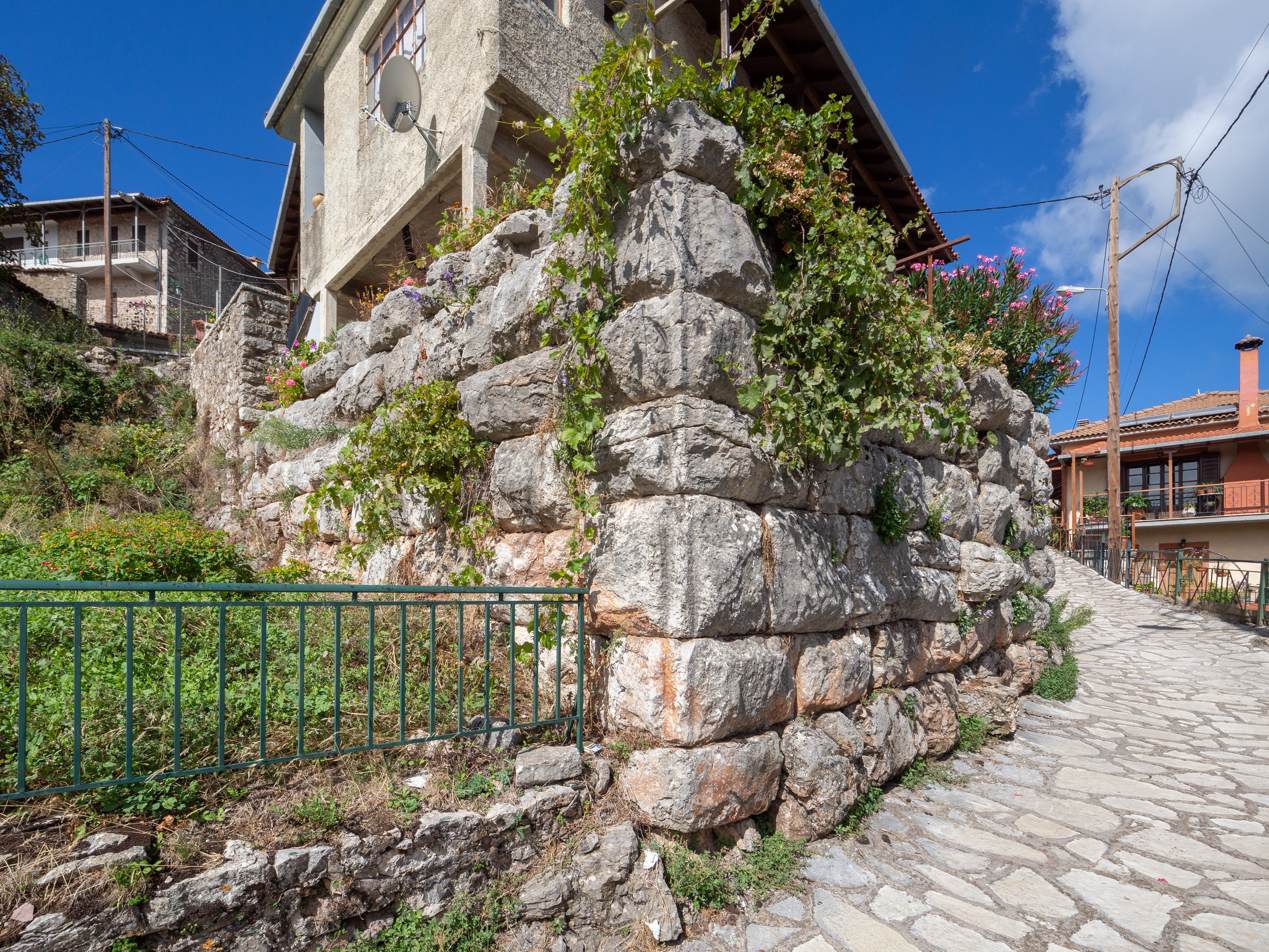
Ancient walls in Dimitsana, a locality usually identified as ancient Teuthis.

Teuthis (Ancient Greek: Τεῦθις or Τευθίς) was a city of ancient Arcadia. It is mentioned in Pausanias, who visited and described its temples, and who narrated the elaborate story of King Teuthis' dispute with Agamemnon and goddess Athena in Aulis, prior to the Greek fleet's departure for the Trojan War.

== Introduction ==
According to Pausanias, Teuthis together with Theisoa and Methydrium, were three cities who originally "belonged" to Orchomenus but whose inhabitants decided to relocate and join many others in forming the Great City (Megalopolis), in 371 BCE in order to better protect themselves from the Spartans.

Although labeled by some as a "Homeric" city, Teuthis is not explicitly mentioned in Homer. Thus, the oldest and practically the only "original" information we have about its location can be found in Pausanias. Unfortunately, his description of the whereabouts of Teuthis is open to interpretation and, therefore, has caused a great deal of disagreement among the 19th century knowledgeable western travelers of Arcadia.

== Location ==
The following tabulation lists the names of the most important of such "περιηγηταί", almost all of which used Pausanias' book as a guide in their Arcadian travels. With regard to Teuthis, their (independent) educated guesses involve two locations: the Akova/Galatas area in the north (the medieval castle of which is situated in a place inhabited in antiquity and whose habitation has had to be continuous),) and the town of Dimitsana in the south (which is also built on older fortified ruins, clearly visible today):

1. Location of Teuthis in the Akova/Galatas area (8)

Pouqueville(Historian), Gell(Archaeologist), Boblaye(Mil. Geographer), Ross(Archaeologist), Curtius(Archaeologist), Aldenhoven(Mil. Surveyor), Peytier(Mil. Surveyor), Kiessling(Cartographer)

2. Location of Teuthis in the Dimitsana area (5)

Leake(Mil. Surveyor), Cramer(Priest), Philippson(Geologist), Lattermann(Epigraphist), Kiepert(Cartographer)

3. Location NOT in Dimitsana (1)

Levi(Archaeol., Transl.)

4. Either location probable (2)

Frazer(Anthropologist), Blűmner(Archaeologist)

In addition to the above, there are a few "περιηγηταί" who did not express their own opinion as to the Teuthis location but, instead, quoted names of the above listing. For example, J. Conder referenced Gell, W. Smith quoted Ross, C. Bursian "thanked" Leake, and W. Hughes' map also reflects Leake's ideas on the subject.

Having practiced - at best - "surface archaeology", most of the distinguished travelers listed above were (understandably) careful when they wrote about the location of the city. They used words like "probably", "perhaps", "may", or the question mark next to its name (Teuthis?). Only Ross, Leake, and Levi took a definite stand on the issue (along with the "cartographers" Peytier, Kiessling, and Kiepert). Finally, Latterman was also firm about his choice, but he erroneously used Leake's name in the process.

== A closer look at Pausanias' visit to Teuthis ==
Travelling on the road which joins Heraia with Megalopolis, Pausanias reached the village of Gortys, which used to be a city, and described the temple of Asclepius [Bk VIII, 28 (1)]. He then wrote about the river of the city, which has very cold water, especially in the summer. He explained that the southern part of it - which flows into the Alpheios - was called Gortynios, while the northern part was called Lousios (i.e. Wash, because new-born Zeus was bathed in it) [Bk VIII, 28 (2)].

The end of the next paragraph in Pausanias's "Arcadika" [Bk VIII, 28 (3)], contains the first significant information about the location problem:

           " Ἔχει μὲν δὴ τὰς πηγὰς ἐν Θεισόᾳ τῆ Μεθυδριεῦσιν ὁμόρῳ"

"But its springs are in Theisoa, which borders on the Methydrienses"

In other words, the Theisoa greater area, which borders the west part of Methydrio, extends all the way north-east of modern Langadia, where the actual springs of Gortynios/Lusios are found.

Any map of the area shows that Theisoa - which is near the modern village of Karkalou - is located quite north of Gortys. Thus, it can be safely assumed that Pausanias was moving in a south-to-north direction, having started from Gortys and going toward Teuthis, since [Bk VIII, 28 (4)]:

           "τῇ χώρᾳ δὲ τῇ Θεισόᾳ προσεχὴς κώμη Τεῦθίς ἐστι: πάλαι δὲ ἦν πόλισμα ἡ Τεῦθις."

"Bordering town to Theisoa is Teuthis, which was formerly a city."

That is, Teuthis, which is bordering Theisoa, was located somewhere north of Gortys.

Pausanias, however, mentions Theisoa first, but does not indicate whether he visited there. And this, gets things complicated. Given the terrain of the greater area and the fact that Methydrium is the eastern neighbor of Theisoa, then Teuthis itself could be either the southern or the north-western neighbor.

Thus, (keeping in mind that Pausanias is coming from the south) one must decide for which one of the two situations the phrase "Teuthis borders Theisoa" makes more sense. [Normally we are interested in what lies ahead of our destination, and not beyond it. Therefore, the preceding "bordering" statement could suggest that Teuthis lies beyond Theisoa, i.e. in its north-northwest.]

== Conclusion ==
It is obvious that only systematic excavations can put an end to the doubts raised by the fact that no inscription naming Teuthis has been found in Dimitsana, the modern town which has "claimed" the name of the ancient city for its own ruins. As for contemporary arguments in support of such a claim, one can judge for himself reading the following opinions of esteemed personnel of the British and French "archaeology" schools in Athens, respectively:

· "Dhimitsana. (...). The site is generally identified with ancient Teuthis".

· "Si l'on admet que Teuthis était au Sud de Thisoa, près du Gortynios, l'attribution àcette bourgade des vestiges antiques visibles dans le village de Dimitsana, au Sud-Ouest de Karkalou"

(If we assume that Teuthis was to the south of Thisoa, near the Gortynios, there can be little doubt as to the attribution of the ancient vestiges visible in the village of Dimitsana to the south-west of Karkalou)

Just for the record: In the 1834 attempt to reorganize the local administration of the Greek nation, which had recently been liberated from the Ottoman occupation, Vyziki, the village closest to Akova, was declared "Δῆμος Τεύθιδος" (Municipality of Teuthis).

Modern scholars place its site near the modern Dimitsana.
