= Syllis (mythology) =

In Greek mythology, Syllis (Ancient Greek: Συλλίδος) was a Sicyonian nymph who mothered Zeuxippus by Apollo. Her son succeeded Phaestus as the king of Sicyon when the latter migrated to Crete. In some accounts, the mother of Zeuxippus was called Hyllis, daughter of Hyllus and Iole.
