= 870 Manto =

Main-belt asteroid

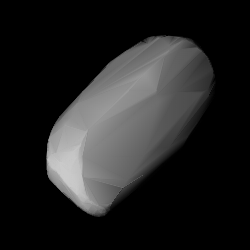
- Modelled shape of Manto from its lightcurve

Discovery
- Discovered by: M. F. Wolf
- Discovery site: Heidelberg Obs.
- Discovery date: 12 May 1917

Designations
- Pronunciation: /ˈmæntoʊ/
- Named after: Μαντώ Mantō (Greek mythology)
- Alternative designations: A917 JC · 1935 NB; 1935 QV · 1953 UE_{1} A907 TF · A914 UC; 1917 BX · 1907 TF; 1914 UC
- Minor planet category: main-belt · (inner); background
- Adjectives: Mantoian /mænˈtoʊ.iən/

Orbital characteristics
- Epoch 31 May 2020 (JD 2459000.5)
- Uncertainty parameter 0
- Observation arc: 102.14 yr (37,307 d)
- Aphelion: 2.9379 AU
- Perihelion: 1.7065 AU
- Semi-major axis: 2.3222 AU
- Eccentricity: 0.2651
- Orbital period (sidereal): 3.54 yr (1,293 d)
- Mean anomaly: 343.87°
- Mean motion: 0° 16^{m} 42.6^{s} / day
- Inclination: 6.1928°
- Longitude of ascending node: 120.80°
- Argument of perihelion: 196.89°

Physical characteristics
- Mean diameter: 11.87±0.16 km; 13.683±0.236 km
- Synodic rotation period: 122.30±0.01 h
- Pole ecliptic latitude: (96.0°, 30.0°) (λ_{1}/β_{1}); (283.0°, 35.0°) (λ_{2}/β_{2})
- Geometric albedo: 0.216±0.040; 0.321±0.010
- Spectral type: SMASS = S; S (S3OS2)
- Absolute magnitude (H): 11.7

870 Manto (prov. designation: A917 JC or 1917 BX) is a stony background asteroid and slow rotator from the inner region of the asteroid belt. It was discovered on 12 May 1917, by astronomer Max Wolf at the Heidelberg Observatory in southwest Germany. The likely heavily elongated S-type asteroid has a long rotation period of 122.3 hours and measures approximately 13 kilometers (8 miles) in diameter. It was named after Manto, a prophetess in Greek mythology.

== Orbit and classification ==
Manto is a non-family asteroid of the main belt's background population when applying the hierarchical clustering method to its proper orbital elements. It orbits the Sun in the inner asteroid belt at a distance of 1.7–2.9 AU once every 3 years and 6 months (1,293 days; semi-major axis of 2.32 AU). Its orbit has an eccentricity of 0.27 and an inclination of 6° with respect to the ecliptic. The asteroid was first observed as A907 TF (1907 TF) at Taunton Observatory (803) on 11 October 1907, and again as A914 UC (1914 UC) at the Simeiz Observatory on 16 October 1914. The body's observation arc begins with its official discovery observation at Heidelberg Observatory on 12 May 1917.

== Naming ==
This minor planet was named after Manto from Greek mythology. She was the daughter of Teresias Thebanus and a famous soothsayer, who erected of a temple of Apollo (Apollo Clarius) in Claros. The naming citation was also mentioned in The Names of the Minor Planets by Paul Herget in 1955 (H 85).

== Physical characteristics ==
Manto is a common stony S-type asteroid in the Bus–Binzel SMASS classification, and in both the Tholen- and SMASS-like taxonomy of the Small Solar System Objects Spectroscopic Survey (S3OS2).

=== Rotation period ===
In September 2013, a rotational lightcurve of Manto was obtained from photometric observations by Frederick Pilcher at the Organ Mesa Observatory (G50), New Mexico, in collaboration with Eduardo Manuel Alvarez, Andrea Ferrero, Daniel Klinglesmith and Julian Oey Lightcurve analysis gave an exceptionally long rotation period of 122.30±0.01 hours with a notably high brightness amplitude of 0.80±0.05 magnitude, indicative of an elongated shape (U=3). With a period above 100 hours, the asteroid is a slow rotator. The result supersedes observations by Alain W. Harris from July 1981, and by astronomers at the Intermediate Palomar Transient Factory in California (U=1/1).

In 2016, a modeled lightcurve gave a concurring sidereal period of 122.166±0.005 hours using data from a large collaboration of individual observers (such as above). The study also determined two spin axes of (96.0°, 30.0°) and (283.0°, 35.0°) in ecliptic coordinates (λ, β).

=== Diameter and albedo ===
According to the surveys carried out by the Japanese Akari satellite and the NEOWISE mission of NASA's Wide-field Infrared Survey Explorer (WISE), Manto measures (11.87±0.16) and (13.683±0.236) kilometers in diameter and its surface has an albedo of (0.321±0.010) and (0.216±0.040), respectively. The Collaborative Asteroid Lightcurve Link assumes a standard albedo for a stony asteroid of 0.20 and calculates a diameter of 13.71 kilometers based on an absolute magnitude of 11.68. The WISE team also published an alternative mean-diameter measurement of (11.009±3.486 km) with a corresponding albedo of (0.305±0.181).
