= Chalcon =

Several characters in Greek mythology

In Greek mythology, the name Chalcon (Ancient Greek: Χάλκων) may refer to:

- Chalcon, one of the Telchines.
- Chalcon, a Myrmidonian, father of Bathycles who was killed by Glaucus in the Trojan War.
- Chalcon, father of a daughter Antiochis who, in one version, married Polybus of Corinth.
- Chalcon, son of Metion and possible father of the Euboean Abas.
- Chalcon of Cyparissia, charioteer, shield-bearer and tutor of Antilochus. During the Trojan War, he fell in love with Penthesilea and was killed by Achilles upon coming to her aid.
- Chalcon occasionally refers to characters otherwise known under the name Chalcodon, including:
  - Chalcon of Cos, a Coan prince as the son of King Eurypylus and Clytie. He was the brother of Chalciope and Antagoras. Chalcon succeeded his father to the throne of Cos.
  - Chalcon, a suitor of Hippodamia.
