= Zeuxippus of Sicyon =

King of Sikyon

In Greek mythology, Zeuxippus (Ancient Greek: Ζεύξιππος) was the successor of Phaestus as king of Sicyon and in turn succeeded by Hippolytus, grandson of the former ruler.

== Family ==
Zeuxippus was the son of Apollo and the nymph Syllis (or Hyllis, daughter of Hyllus and Iole).

== Mythology ==
Zeuxippus appears in the account of Pausanias' Description of Greece:

After Phaestus in obedience to an oracle migrated to Crete, the next king is said to have been Zeuxippus, the son of Apollo and the nymph Syllis. On the death of Zeuxippus, Agamemnon led an army against Sicyon and king Hippolytus, the son of Rhopalus, the son of Phaestus.

Despite this, Zeuxippus is also mentioned by Ibycus as having fought in the Trojan War, being compared to Troilus in terms of his beauty.

According to Eusebius, Zeuxippus reigned for 31 years.

== General and cited references ==
- Pausanias, Description of Greece with an English Translation by W.H.S. Jones, Litt.D., and H.A. Ormerod, M.A., in 4 Volumes. Cambridge, MA, Harvard University Press; London, William Heinemann Ltd. 1918. ISBN 0-674-99328-4. Online version at the Perseus Digital Library
- Pausanias, Graeciae Descriptio. 3 vols. Leipzig, Teubner. 1903. Greek text available at the Perseus Digital Library.
