= Amphiclus =

In Greek mythology, Amphiclus (Ancient Greek: Ἄμφικλον or Ἄμφικλος) may refer to two different characters:

- Amphiclus, succeeded King Oenopion and his sons on the throne of Chios. He came from Histiaea in Euboea and went to the island of Chios because of an oracle from Delphi.
- Amphiclus, a Trojan soldier who participated in the Trojan War and was slain by Meges, one of the Achaean Leaders.
