= Patreus =

Patreus (Ancient Greek: Πατρεύς; Modern Greek: Πατρέας, Patreas) was the mythical founder of the city of Patras, Greece.

== Family ==
Patreus was the son of Preugenes and ninth descendant of Lacedaemon, the founder of Sparta.

== Mythology ==
Patreus was the leader of the Achaeans who came from Sparta after the renowned Dorian Invasion. The Ionians who occupied the region were forced to leave their settlements and travel to Attica and Ionia on the western coast of Asia Minor. It was then that Patreus was crowned King of Aroe, one of the small city-states that lay in the region. Under Patreus' reign, Aroe was unified with two other neighbouring cities, Messatis and Antheia. The new united city was named "Patras" (ancient greek: "Πάτραι"), after Patreus, its mythical founder. His tomb was shown in the city's marketplace, next to the statue of Athena.
