= Alcyone (mythology) =

Multiple women in Greek mythology

In Greek mythology, Alcyone (/ælˈsaɪ.əniː/; Ancient Greek: Ἀλκυόνη, romanized: Alkyóne, derived from ἀλκυών alkyón, "kingfisher") was the name of the following personages.

- Alcyone, one of the Pleiades seven sisters.
- Alcyone, daughter of Aeolus and wife of Ceyx.
- Alcyone, daughter of Sthenelus and Nicippe (Antibia or Archippe). She undoubtedly witnessed the results of the labors of Heracles, and she herself was indebted to the hero when he killed Hómados (Ὅμαδος) the Centaur, who had attempted to rape her.
- Alcyone, most commonly called Cleopatra, the wife of Meleager.
- Alcyone, wife of King Chalcodon of Euboea and possible mother of Elephenor.
- Alcyone, a priestess at Argos for three generations before the Trojan War.
- Alcyone, mother of Serus and Alazygus by Halirrhotius, son of Perieres.
- Alcyone, daughter of Sciron who was killed by her father.
