= Phyleus =

Elean prince and one of the Calydonian boar hunters in Greek mythology

In Greek mythology, Phyleus (/ˈfɪlˌjuːs/; Ancient Greek: Φυλεύς probably derived from φυλή phylē "tribe, clan, race, people") was an Elean prince and one of the Calydonian boar hunters.

== Family ==
Phyleus was the elder son of King Augeas of Elis and father of Meges by Eustyoche, Hagnete Ctimene, or Ctesimache. Timandra, a daughter of King Tyndareus of Sparta, committed adultery with Phyleus (another possible mother of Meges) and deserted her husband Echemus.

Phyleus was also credited to be the father of Eurydameia, mother of Euchenor and Cleitus by Polyidus.

== Mythology ==
During the fifth labour of Heracles, the hero asked for payment from Augeas not revealing the command of Eurystheus. But the Elean king knowing the task imposed to the hero, he refused to give him his reward. During the arbitration, Phyleus, witness of the task, was called by Heracles to testify against Augeas. Phyleus supported the hero instead of his father in the matter of the Augean Stables thus in his anger, the king exiled both Phyleus and Heracles. After the latter killed Augeas and his other sons, he gave Phyleus the kingdom. During the time of his exile, Phyleus led a colony of Epeans to the island of Dulichium. Thus, his son Meges led the contingent from Dulichium to the Trojan War.
