= Oxylus =

Greek mythological figures

In Greek mythology, Oxylus (/ˈɒksɪləs/; Ancient Greek: Ὄξυλος, romanized: Óxulos) may refer to:

- Oxylus, daimon of the mountain beech forests, son of Orius (mountain-god of Othrys or the Pindus), who is noted in the Deipnosophistae for fathering the Hamadryads with his own sister Hamadryas.
- Oxylus, son for Ares and Protogeneia, daughter of Calydon.
- Oxylus, king of Elis; from Aetolia, son of Haemon (himself son of Thoas) or of Andraemon.
