= Hamadryas (mythology) =

Mother of hamadryads in Greek mythology

In Greek mythology, Hamadryas (Ancient Greek: Ἁμαδρυάς, romanized: Hamadruás) was the daughter of Orius (mountain-god of Othrys or the Pindus) and sister of Oxylus (daimon of the mountain forest).

== Name ==
Hamadryas' name means "Together-with-Tree" and "Together-with-Oak" from the Greek words hama and drys - the latter being both "holm oak" and generic "tree."

== Mythology ==
By her own brother, Oxylus, Hamadryas bore eight daughters—namely Aegeirus (poplar), Ampelus (vine), Balanus (acorn), Carya (walnut), Craneia (cornel), Morea (mulberry), Ptelea (elm), and Syke (fig). These were called hamadryads, and many trees derive their names from them.
