= Polyphonte =

Character in Greek mythology

Polyphonte (Ancient Greek: Πολυφόντη, romanized: Poluphóntē, lit. 'slayer of many') is a character in Greek mythology, transformed into a strix.

== Family ==
Polyphonte was the daughter of Hipponous and Thrassa; her grandparents on her mother's side were the war god Ares and Tereine, a daughter of the river god Strymon.

== Mythology ==
The story of her life is contained in only one source, namely Antoninus Liberalis' Metamorphoses. Antonius cites Boeus' second book, The Origin of Birds as the source of the story; however, Boeus' work has been lost.

=== Wrath of Aphrodite ===
Wishing to remain a virgin, Polyphonte fled to the mountains to become a companion of Artemis, and scorning the honours of Aphrodite, the goddess of love and procreation. This provoked the ire of the goddess, who viewed Polyphonte's decision and dismissive attitude as a personal affront. To punish Polyphonte for failing to honor her womanly duty, Aphrodite drove her mad and caused her to lust after a bear.

Artemis was disgusted with Polyphonte and so turned a large horde of wild animals against her. Fearing for her life, Polyphonte was forced to return to her father's home.

=== Birth of the bear twins ===
Once at home, Polyphonte gave birth to two humanoid bear-like sons, Agrius and Oreius (the result of her union with the bear). Agrius and Oreius grew into huge men of immense strength. As perhaps befits their feral patronage, the Bear Twins honored neither men nor gods. Indeed, they were cannibals who attacked strangers on the road.

Zeus despised Agrius and Oreius and so sent Hermes to punish them as he saw fit. The brothers almost had their hands and feet severed by the vengeful god were it not for the intervention of their great-grandfather Ares. Despite their monstrous nature, Ares persuaded Hermes to commute the sentence. Together, Hermes and Ares transformed Agrius, Oreius, Polyphonte, and the family's female servant into birds. Polyphonte was transformed into the owl-like strix, which neither ate nor drank and cried during that night, which portended war and sedition for mankind. (Note: The original Greek reads styx (ϛύξ / στύξ), but emended to stryx (ϛρίγξ / στρίξ).) As for her sons, Oreius was turned into a "bird called lagōs" (hypothetically translated as an "eagle owl") (Note: lagos (λαγῶς), means "hare". Celoria (1992), pp. 163–164, notes. The proposed solution that lagōs might be bubo (horned owl or eagle owl) is based on the observation that Ovid, Seneca, and Statius, associate together the three birds bubo, vultur, and strix, the latter two being the incarnations of Agrius and Polyphonte.) regarded as ill omen, and Agrius was turned into a vulture, a despised carrion-eating bird. In a small act of mercy, Ares and Hermes heeded the female servant's prayer where she had no involvement in the Bear Twins' actions and decided not to transform her into a bird heralding evil for mankind. Instead, she was transformed into a woodpecker (supposedly a sign of good luck if seen before a hunt).

== Parallels to other stories ==
The story bears strong similarities with the tales of Hippolytus, Atalanta and Callisto. It has been suggested that all these tales deal with the function of Artemis within the rituals of Ancient Greece and shed light on how they saw a woman's first sexual encounter. In so far as the tale details bestiality as a punishment for offending the gods, the myth is also similar to that of Pasiphaë who mated with the Cretan Bull resulting in the Minotaur's birth.

French folklorist Paul Delarue listed this story as an ancient parallel to the European tale of Jean de l'Ours, a strong hero born of a human woman and a bear.
