= Timandra (mythology) =

Spartan princess and later on queen of Arcadia in Greek mythology

In Greek mythology, Timandra (Ancient Greek: Τιμάνδρα, lit. 'one who honors man' or 'honor of a man') was a Spartan princess and later queen of Arcadia. Her name is derived from two ancient Greek root words: timē (meaning honor or respect) and aner or andros (meaning man).

== Family ==
Timandra was one of the daughters of King Tyndareus and Leda, daughter of King Thestius of Pleuron, Aetolia. Thus, she was the sister of the twins Castor and Pollux, Helen, Clytemnestra, Phoebe and Philonoe.

Timandra married Echemus, the king of Arcadia and bore him a son Ladocus. By Phyleus, son of King Augeas of Elis, she was one of the possible mothers of Meges, an Achaean Leader during the Trojan War. Timandra might be the mother of Phyleus’ daughter Eurydameia who begot Euchenor and Cleitus by the seer Polyeidus.

== Mythology ==
Like her sisters Clytemnestra and Helen, she was also unfaithful and deserted Echemus for Phyleus, the king of Dulichium.

This can be explained by the following account with Stesichorus and Hesiod as the authorities:

"Steischorus says that while sacrificing to the gods Tyndareus forgot Aphrodite and that the goddess was angry and made his daughters twice and thrice wed and deserters of their husbands . . . And Hesiod also says:
"And laughter-loving Aphrodite felt jealous when she looked on them and cast them into evil report. Then Timandra deserted Echemus and went and came to Phyleus, dear to the deathless gods; and even so Clytaemnestra deserted god-like Agamemnon and lay with Aegisthus and chose a worse mate; and even so Helen dishonoured the couch of golden-haired Menelaus."
