= Agrius and Oreius =

Sons of Polyphonte (Greek Mythology)

In Greek mythology, Agrius or Agrios (/ˈæɡriəs/; Ancient Greek: Ἄγριος, lit. 'wild, savage') and Oreios, also Oreius, Orius or Oreus, (Ὄρειος means ‘of the mountain’) were the twin sons of Polyphonte, daughter of Hipponous, and a bear as well as them being the great-grandsons of Ares.

== Mythology ==
Polyphonte was punished by Aphrodite for the former did not worship her, instead becoming a devotee of the virgin goddess Artemis. The goddess of love made her to couple with a bear causing Artemis to have the animals of the forest attack her. Polyphonte fled back to her father and gave birth to twin savage bear-like children named Agrius and Orius. They were of immense strength, but they did not honour the gods and ate whatever stranger they happened upon. Zeus eventually sent Hermes to take care of them, and he decided to chop off their hands and feet. But Ares, Polyphonte's forefather, changed Hermes' mind so the two gods turned them all into birds. Polyphonte became a small owl, Orius became an eagle owl, a bird that presages little good to anyone when it appears, Agrius was turned into a vulture, birds that crave for human flesh and blood. The family's female servant was changed into a woodpecker, for she begged to become a good bird.
