= Manto (mythology) =

Several figures in Greek mythology

There are several figures in Greek mythology named Manto /ˈmæntoʊ/ (Ancient Greek: Μαντώ), the most prominent being the daughter of Tiresias. The name Manto derives from Ancient Greek Mantis, "seer, prophet".

- Manto, daughter of Tiresias.
- Manto, daughter of Heracles. According to Servius (comm. on Virgil, Aeneid X, 199), some held that this was the Manto for whom Mantua was named.
- Manto, daughter of the seer Polyidus. She and her sister Astycrateia were brought to Megara by their father, who came there to cleanse Alcathous for the murder of his son Callipolis. The tomb of the two sisters was shown at Megara in later times.
- Manto, daughter of another famous seer, Melampus. Her mother was Iphianeira, daughter of Megapenthes, and her siblings were Antiphates, Bias and Pronoe.

== See also ==
- 870 Manto
