= Paraebius =

Thracian man in Greek mythology

In Greek mythology, Paraebius (Ancient Greek: Παραίβιος, romanized: Paraíbios) is a Thracian man, a subject of king Phineus of Salmydessus. For years Paraebius suffered greatly due to an injustice committed by his father against a hamadryad nymph, until advice from Phineus led him to salvation. After that, Paraebius became one of Phineus' most loyal and devoted servants. The story of Paraebius is preserved in the second-century BC epic Argonautica by Apollonius of Rhodes, in which Jason and the Argonauts reach Thrace and meet Paraebius and the other Thracian people.

== Family ==
Nothing is known about Paraebius' lineage, other than he dwelled somewhere in Thynia, an ancient region in the European coast of the Propontis sea; he might have been a slave or a farm owner.

== Mythology ==
When Paraebius' father was young, he set out to cut some woods. A hamadryad that dwelled in one of the oak tree stumps he meant to cut down begged him tearfully to spare her tree, but the man foolishly ignored her pleas and felled her oak tree house. The angered hamadryad then lay a terrible curse on him and his children, a curse that Paraebius inherited. For years he toiled and struggled harshly but saw no respite from his labours, and grew poorer and poorer.

Eventually he sook out the seer-king Phineus and recounted to him his troubles. Phineus then realised that Paraebius was being tormented due to his father's sins, and advised him to build an altar to the wronged nymph and make offerings to her. Paraebius did as told, his prayers were eventually heard and his curse lifted. Thereafter he was ever loyal to Phineus, and not a day passed that Paraebius forgot about or neglected him as his unfortunate master was being harassed by the Harpies. Phineus had often difficulty in making Paraebius leave the house at all.

Years later, when the hero Jason and the Argonauts arrived at Phineus' land, Paraebius received the strangers warmly and prepared sheep for them at Phineus’ command. Phineus then explained Paraebius' story to the foreigners.

== Culture ==
Paraebius' brief tale shares a pattern with other mythological heroes who are asked to spare or save a nymph's tree, and are rewarded or punished accordingly to how they responded to the plea. The narrative of Paraebius' tale interwines hubris, or excessive pride, with powerlessness. Apollonius seems to have been inspired by the similar myth of Demeter and the Thessalian king as related in Callimachus' Hymn to Demeter, given that the parallels are too close to be a coincidence.

== Legacy ==
Paraebius is also one of the names given to dolichognatha, a genus of tropical and subtropical long-jawed orb-weavers.

== See also ==
- Erysichthon of Thessaly, who was also cursed for cutting down a nymph’s tree
- Arcas, who married a nymph after saving her tree
- Rhoecus of Cnidus, who saved a tree and its nymph

== Bibliography ==
- Apollonius Rhodius, Argonautica translated by Robert Cooper Seaton (1853–1915), R. C. Loeb Classical Library Volume 001. London, William Heinemann Ltd, 1912. Text available online at the Internet Archive.
- Grant, Michael; Hazel, John (August 2, 2004). Who's Who in Classical Mythology. London and New York: Routledge. ISBN 0-415-26041-8.
- Grimal, Pierre (1987). The Dictionary of Classical Mythology. Wiley-Blackwell. ISBN 0-631-13209-0.
- Hard, Robin (2004). The Routledge Handbook of Greek Mythology: Based on H.J. Rose's "Handbook of Greek Mythology". Routledge. ISBN 9780415186360.
- March, Jennifer R. (May 31, 2014). Dictionary of Classical Mythology. Oxbow Books. ISBN 978-1-78297-635-6.
- Stephens, Susan A. (2015). Callimachus: The Hymns. UK, US: Oxford University Press. ISBN 978-0-19-978304-5.
- Toohey, Peter (September 2, 2003). Reading Epic: An Introduction to the Ancient Narratives. London and New York: Routledge. ISBN 0-415-04227-5.
- Tripp, Edward (June 1970). Crowell's Handbook of Classical Mythology (1st ed.). Thomas Y. Crowell Co. ISBN 069022608X.
