= Rhoecus of Cnidus =

Cnidian man in Greek mythology

In ancient Greek mythology, Rhoecus (Ancient Greek: Ῥοῖκος, romanized: Rhoîkos) is a rich man from Cnidus, an ancient Greek colony on the southwestern coast of Asia Minor. According to the tale, Rhoecus saved a nymph and her tree from certain death, so the nymph agreed to be his lover, until his unpleasant behaviour soured her against him. His brief tale survives in scattered ancient fragments and scholia from several authors pieced together.

== Mythology ==
Rhoecus was a nobleman from Cnidus, an ancient city in western Asia Minor (Anatolia). According to fifth-century BC writer Charon of Lampsacus, apparently while in Nineveh he noticed an old oak tree that was in danger of being toppled over, and ordered his servants to prop it up. The hamadryad nymph who resided in the tree was greatly relieved, for Rhoecus had saved her from perishing along with the tree, so she promised him any boon he might ask from her. Smitten with her beauty, Rhoecus asked the nymph to become his lover. She agreed on the condition that he would remain faithful to her, and when time was due she would send for him via a bee.

Time passed, and the nymph at last sent the bee to summon Rhoecus, which found him in the middle of a game of draughts. Rhoecus, greatly captivated by the game, reacted brusquely to the bee's presence. The nymph was enraged with his foul behaviour, so she blinded him in revenge. In another version by Pindar, the bee seems to sting him in response to some sort of infidelity on his part against the nymph.

== Culture ==
Humans being punished for being unable to keep an agreement with a (semi-)divine being is a common recurring theme in Greek mythology, as is the pattern of a man being asked to save or spare a nymph's sacred tree, and being accordingly rewarded or punished depending on his actions, as seen in the myths of Erysichthon and Paraebius. In fact the ancient scholiast on Apollonius mentions the story of Rhoecus à propos of Paraebius' tale. Another story it resembles is that of Daphnis, the shepherd who was blinded by a nymph he promised fidelity to; given the number of myths concerning the safety of a nymph and her tree, it seems that this mythical element was separate from the bee and fidelity aspects of Rhoecus' myth.

The part of Rhoecus' unacceptable behaviour against the bee might have been a later development, following an original infidelity element. The inconsistency between the hamadryad's demand that Rhoecus remain faithful to her, and his eventual sin being rudeness seems to confirm that, combined with Pindar writing about Rhoecus' perfidity. On the other hand it has been argued that his aggressive attitude against the bee can constitute perfidity without hint of adultery, and confusion of motives is not uncommon in ancient mythologies.

Of the four ancient authors who mention Rhoecus, only the scholiast on Theocritus says that Rhoecus hailed from Cnidus, although he placed the action of the tale in Assyria.

== Legacy ==
Rhoecus' myth influenced certain poets of the modern era, such as James Russell Lowell who featured Rhoecus in one of his shorter poems.

A youth named Rhoecus, wandering in the wood,
Saw an old oak just trembling to its fall,
And, feeling pity of so fair a tree,
He propped its gray trunk with admiring care,

— James Russell Lowell

== See also ==
- Arcas, who married a nymph after saving her tree
- Daphnis, a man blinded by a nymph for being unfaithful

== Bibliography ==
- Avery, Catherine B., ed. (1962). New Century Classical Handbook. New York, US: Appleton-Century-Crofts.
- Bulfinch, Thomas (1970). Bulfinch's Mythology: Age of Fable, a modern abridgment by Edmund Fuller. USA: Dell.
- Etymologicum Magnum, edited by Friedrich Sylburg. Lipsiae: Apud J.A.G. Weigel. 1816. Online text available at the Internet Archive.
- Gayley, Charles Mills (1893). The Classic Myths in English Literature: Based Chiefly on Bulfinch's "Age of Fable". Boston, USA: Ginn & Co.
- Grimal, Pierre (1987). The Dictionary of Classical Mythology. Wiley-Blackwell. ISBN 0-631-13209-0.
- Hard, Robin (2004). The Routledge Handbook of Greek Mythology: Based on H. J. Rose's "Handbook of Greek Mythology". Routledge. ISBN 9780415186360.
- Meeusen, Michiel (2016). Plutarch's Science of Natural Problems: A Study with Commentary on Quaestiones Naturales. Belgium: Leuven University Press. ISBN 978-94-6270-084-0.
- Plutarch, Quaestiones Naturales in Moralia, Volume XI: On the Malice of Herodotus. Causes of Natural Phenomena, with an English translated from Greek by Lionel Pearson, F. H. Sandbach. Loeb Classical Library 426. Cambridge, MA: Harvard University Press, 1965.
- Robinson, Ellis (1899). "Ibis 541, 2". The American Journal of Philology. 20 (1): 75–77. doi:10.2307/287950. JSTOR 287950.
- Senzasono, Luigi (2006). Plutarco: Cause dei fenomeni naturali. Introduzione, testo critico, traduzione e comment [Plutarch: Causes of Natural Phenomena. Instroduction, critical text, translation and commentary] (in Italian). Naples, Italy: D'Auria M. ISBN 8870922626.
- Wendel, Carl (1914). Scholia in Theocritum vetera. Leipzig: B. G. Teubner.
