= Methydrium =

Town in central ancient Arcadia

Coordinates: 37°38′15″N 22°10′24″E

Methydrium or Methydrion (Ancient Greek: Μεθύδριον) was a town in central ancient Arcadia, situated 170 stadia north of Megalopolis. It obtained its name, like the places called Interamna, from being situated upon a lofty height between the two rivers Maloetas and Mylaon. According to Greek mythology, it was founded by Orchomenus; but its inhabitants were removed to Megalopolis, upon the establishment of that city (371 BCE). It never recovered its former population, and is mentioned by Strabo among the places of Arcadia which had almost entirely disappeared. It continued, however, to exist as a village in the time of Pausanias, who saw there a temple of Poseidon Hippius upon the river Mylaon. He also mentions, above the river Maloetas, a mountain called Thaumasium, in which was a cave where Rhea took refuge when pregnant with Zeus. At the distance of 30 stadia from Methydrium was a fountain named Nymphasia. Methydrium is also mentioned by Thucydides, Xenophon, (Anabasis, 4.6.20), Polybius, Pliny the Elder, and Stephanus of Byzantium.

Its site is located near the modern Methydrio, which was renamed to reflect association with the ancient town. The remains of ancient Methydrium have been excavated in 1910.
