= Polyidus (son of Coeranus) =

Seer in Greek mythology

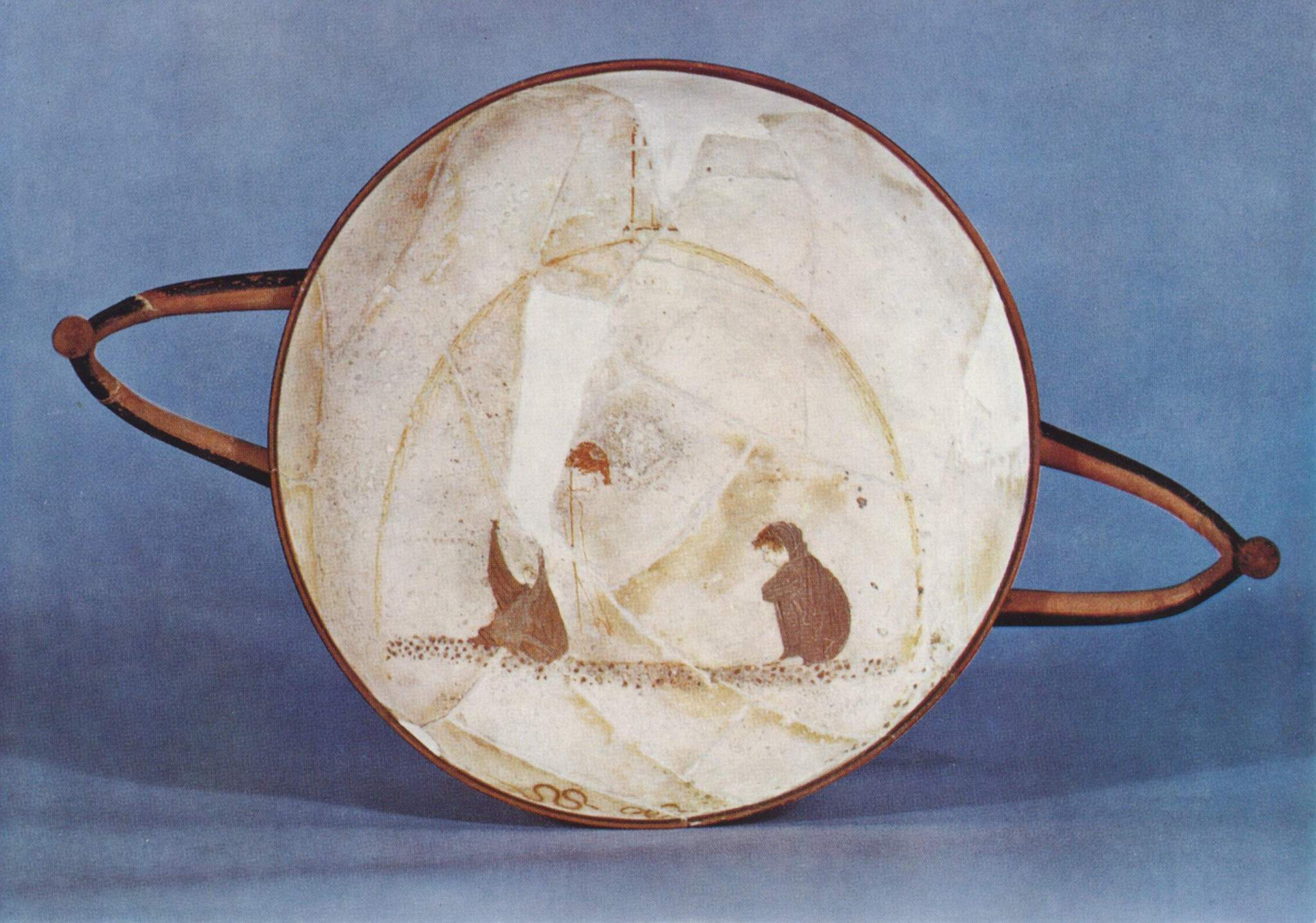
Polydius (left) with Glaucus (right) on an Attic white-ground kylix, c. 460–450 BC, attributed to the Sotades Painter, British Museum.

In Greek mythology, Polyidus (/ˌpɒliˈaɪdəs/; Ancient Greek: Πολύειδος, romanized: Polúeidos, lit. 'he who sees many things') also known as Polyeidus, is the son of Coeranus, and a famous seer from Argos or Corinth.

== Family ==
Polyidus was a descendant of another renowned seer, Melampus, king of Argos. Given that Melampus had two sons, Abas and Mantius, different sources made Coeranus, father of Polyidus, son or grandson of either of the two. Briefly, the two alternate lineages were:

1. Melampus– Abas– Coeranus– Polyidus
2. Melampus– Mantius– Cleitus– Coeranus– Polyidus

According to a scholiast on Homer's Iliad, Polyidus had two sons, Euchenor and Cleitus, by Eurydameia, daughter of Phyleus. Pausanias makes Polyeidus the father of Coeranus, Manto and Astycrateia, and calls Euchenor his grandson through Coeranus.

== Mythology ==
=== Glaucus ===
The best known myth concerning Polyidus is the one that deals with him saving the life of Glaucus, which runs as follows. One day, Glaucus, son of King Minos and Queen Pasiphaë of Crete, was playing with a mouse and suddenly disappeared. The Kuretes told Minos: "A marvelous creature has been born amongst you: whoever finds the true likeness for this creature will also find the child."

They interpreted this to refer to a newborn calf in Minos' herd. Three times a day, the calf changed color from white to red to black. Polyidus ( or Asclepius, god of medicine) observed the similarity to the ripening of the fruit of the mulberry, and Minos sent him to find Glaucus.

Searching for the boy, Polyidus saw an owl driving bees away from a wine-cellar in Minos' palace. Inside the wine-cellar was a cask of honey, with Glaucus dead inside. Minos demanded Glaucus be brought back to life and ordered Polyidus to be entombed with the body. When a snake appeared nearby, Polyidus killed it immediately. Another snake came for the first, and after seeing its mate dead, the second serpent left and returned with an herb which then brought the first snake back to life. With the herb Polyidus resurrected the child.

Minos refused to let Polyidus leave Crete until he taught Glaucus the art of divination. Polyidus did so, but then, at the last second before leaving to Argos, he asked Glaucus to spit in his mouth. Glaucus did so and forgot everything he had been taught.

The story of Polyidus and Glaucus was the subject of a lost play of Euripides, his Bellerophon, and of one by Aeschylus, and Sophocles' lost The Mantises. Previously unknown fragments of Euripides' Polyidus and another play, Ino, were found in 2022 and publicized in 2024.

=== Other stories ===
It is related that Polyidus advised Bellerophon as to how to find and tame Pegasus, in order to kill the Chimera.

Polyidus was said to have come to Megara to purify Alcathous, son of Pelops, for the accidental murder of the latter's son Callipolis. He also built the sanctuary of Dionysus Patroos (Paternal), and dedicated a wooden image that in Pausanias' day was covered up except the face, which alone was exposed. The tomb of his two daughters was shown at Megara.

Polyidus also appears in one of the stories collected in Pseudo-Plutarch's On Rivers: he explains to Lysippe, mother of Teuthras, the source of her son's insanity.
