= Euchenor =

In Greek mythology, the name Euchenor (Ancient Greek: Εὐχήνωρ, gen.: Εὐχήνορος) may refer to:

- Euchenor, an Egyptian prince as one of the sons of King Aegyptus. He suffered the same fate as his other brothers, save Lynceus, when they were slain on their wedding night by their wives who obeyed the command of their father King Danaus of Libya (and later Argos). Euchenor's mother was an Arabian woman and thus full brother of Istrus, Chalcodon, Agenor, Chaetus, Diocorystes, Alces, Hippothous, Alcmenor and Hippolytus. In some accounts, he could be a son of Aegyptus either by Eurryroe, daughter of the river-god Nilus, or Isaie, daughter of King Agenor of Tyre. Euchenor married the Danaid Iphimedousa, daughter of Danaus either by the hamadryads Atlanteia or Phoebe.
- Euchenor, son of the seer Polyeidos and Eurydameia, brother of Cleitus, from Corinth. The brothers participated in the campaign of the Epigoni and afterwards fought in the Trojan War. Polyeidos had predicted that Euchenor would either die of an illness in his home city, or fall at Troy; Euchenor chose to go to the war and was eventually killed by Paris. Alternately, Euchenor was a grandson of Polyeidos; he was said to have dedicated a sacred image to Dionysus, surnamed Dasyllius, at Megara.
- Euchenor, father, by Phlogea, of Echetus, a king probably ruling in mainland Greece.
- Euchenor, one of the sons of King Aeolus of Lipara, the keeper of the winds. He had five brothers namely: Periphas, Agenor, Klymenos, Xouthos and Macareus, and six sisters: Klymene, Kallithyia, Eurygone, Lysidike, Kanake and an unnamed one. According to various accounts, Aeolus yoked in marriage his sons, including Euchenor, and daughters in order to preserve concord and affection among them.
