= Atlanteia =

Hamadryad in Greek mythology

In Greek mythology, Atlanteia or Atlantia (Ancient Greek: Ἀτλαντεία) was a Hamadryad nymph who consorted with King Danaus of Libya and perhaps the mother of some of the Danaïdes: Hippodamia, Rhodia, Cleopatra, Asteria, Hippodamia, Glauce, Hippomedusa, Gorge, Iphimedusa, and Rhode.

Apollodorus only identified these daughters of Danaus by Atlantia and Phoebe (another hamadryad), not specifying who was the daughter of the other. These ten women joined the sons of King Aegyptus of Egypt who were begotten on an Arabian woman. Later on, these princesses slew their cousin-husbands during their wedding night.

According to Hippostratus, Danaus had all of his progeny by a single woman, Europa, daughter of the river-god Nilus. In some accounts, he married his cousin Melia, daughter of Agenor, king of Tyre.
