= Phoebe (mythology) =

Set of mythological Greek characters

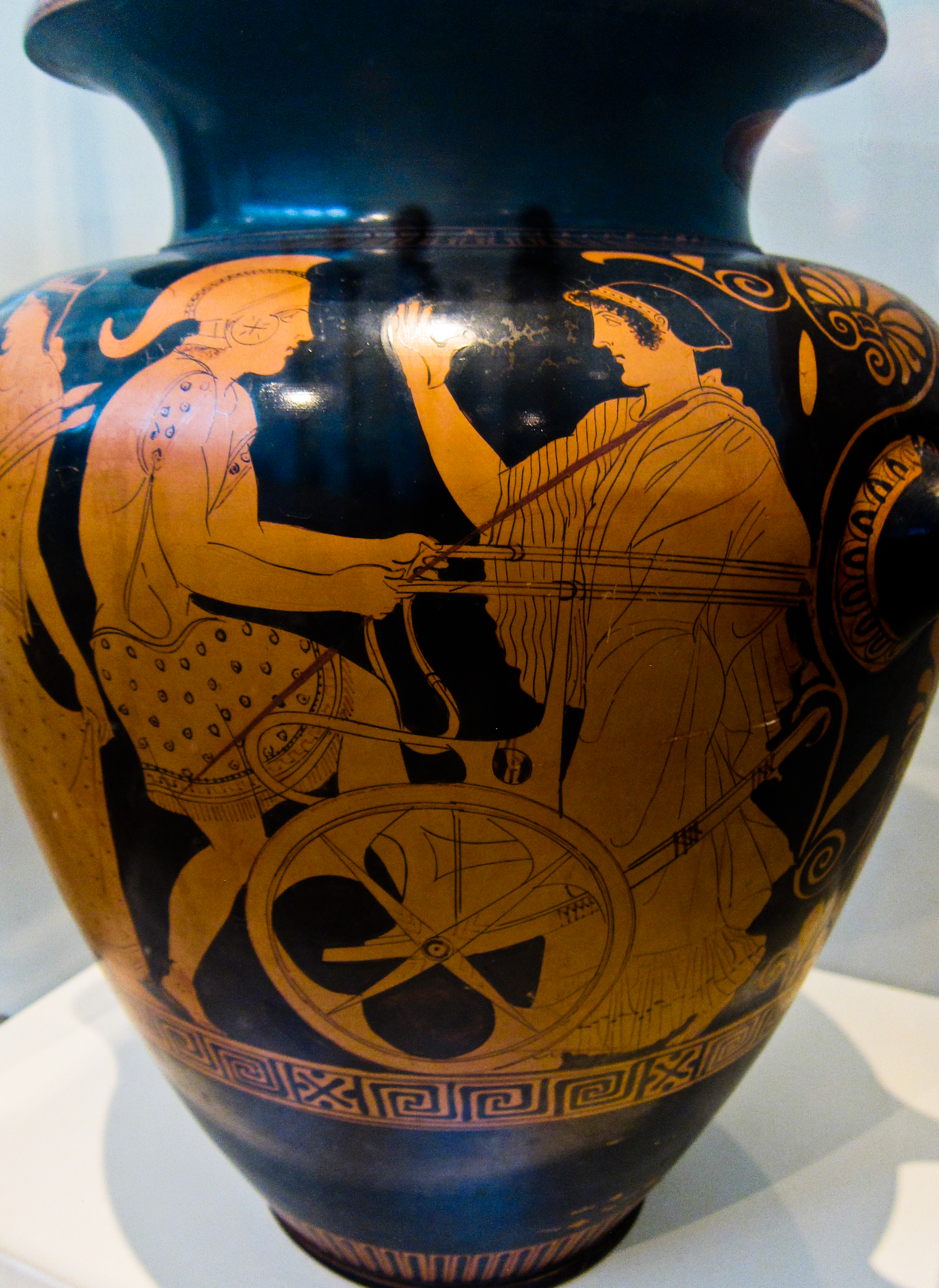
Phoebe (right) witnesses her sister Helen (left) being abducted by Theseus and Pirithous (middle), Attic red-figure stamnos c. 430-420 BC. National Archaeological Museum, Greece.

In Greek mythology, Phoebe (/ˈfiːbi/ FEE-bee; Ancient Greek: Φοίβη, romanized: Phoíbē, lit. 'bright, shining') is the name or epithet of the following characters:

- Phoebe, one of the twelve Titans, sister-wife of Coeus and mother of Leto and Asteria.
- Phoebe, daughter of Leucippus.
- Phoebe, a hamadryad who became one of King Danaus's many wives or concubines and possible mother of some of these Danaïdes: Hippodamia, Rhodia, Cleopatra, Asteria, Glauce, Hippomedusa, Gorge, Iphimedusa and Rhode. Apollodorus only identified these daughters of Danaus by Phoebe and Atlantia (another hamadryad), not specifying who was the daughter of the other. These ten women joined the sons of Aegyptus who were begotten by Eurryroe, traditionally seen as an Arabian woman, a naiad, daughter of Nilus (the Nile) and a sister of Europa. Later on, these princesses slew their cousin-husbands during their wedding night. According to Hippostratus, Danaus had all of his progeny by a single woman, Europe, daughter of the river-god Nilus. In some accounts, he married his cousin Melia, daughter of Agenor, king of Tyre. Other classic poets give a number of mothers to the sons of Aegyptus and the daughters of Danaus. Argyphia, Tyria, the naiad Caliadne, Gorgo and Hephaestine are also given as mothers of the sons of Aegyptos. According to Apollodorus twelve of whom were born to the naiad Polyxo; six to Pieria; two to Elephantis; four to Queen Europa; ten to the hamadryad nymphs Atlanteia and Phoebe; seven to an Aethiopian woman; three to Memphis; two to Herse and lastly four to Crino.
- Phoebe, one of the Heliades.
- Phoebe, a Spartan princess who was the daughter of King Tyndareus and Leda, daughter of King Thestius of Pleuron. She was the (half-)sister of Castor and Pollux, Helen, Clytemnestra, Timandra and Philonoe.
- Phoebe, one of the Amazons who fought against Heracles.
- Phoebe, an epithet of Artemis, also shared by Selene.

Also, Phoebe (crater) on Saturn's small moon Janus is named after Phoebe of Messenia.

== General and cited references ==
- Apollodorus, The Library with an English Translation by Sir James George Frazer, F.B.A., F.R.S. in 2 Volumes, Cambridge, MA, Harvard University Press; London, William Heinemann Ltd. 1921. ISBN 0-674-99135-4. Online version at the Perseus Digital Library. Greek text available from the same website.
- Diodorus Siculus, The Library of History translated by Charles Henry Oldfather. Twelve volumes. Loeb Classical Library. Cambridge, Massachusetts: Harvard University Press; London: William Heinemann, Ltd. 1989. Vol. 3. Books 4.59–8. Online version at Bill Thayer's Web Site
- Diodorus Siculus, Bibliotheca Historica. Vol 1-2. Immanel Bekker. Ludwig Dindorf. Friedrich Vogel. in aedibus B. G. Teubneri. Leipzig. 1888-1890. Greek text available at the Perseus Digital Library.
- Euripides, The Plays of Euripides, translated by E. P. Coleridge. Volume II. London. George Bell and Sons. 1891. Online version at the Perseus Digital Library.
- Euripides, Euripidis Fabulae. vol. 3. Gilbert Murray. Oxford. Clarendon Press, Oxford. 1913. Greek text available at the Perseus Digital Library.
- Gaius Julius Hyginus, Fabulae from The Myths of Hyginus translated and edited by Mary Grant. University of Kansas Publications in Humanistic Studies. Online version at the Topos Text Project.
- Hesiod, Theogony from The Homeric Hymns and Homerica with an English Translation by Hugh G. Evelyn-White, Cambridge, MA., Harvard University Press; London, William Heinemann Ltd. 1914. Online version at the Perseus Digital Library. Greek text available from the same website.
- Publius Ovidius Naso, Metamorphoses translated by Brookes More (1859-1942). Boston, Cornhill Publishing Co. 1922. Online version at the Perseus Digital Library.
- Publius Ovidius Naso, Metamorphoses. Hugo Magnus. Gotha (Germany). Friedr. Andr. Perthes. 1892. Latin text available at the Perseus Digital Library.
- Publius Ovidius Naso, The Epistles of Ovid. London. J. Nunn, Great-Queen-Street; R. Priestly, 143, High-Holborn; R. Lea, Greek-Street, Soho; and J. Rodwell, New-Bond-Street. 1813. Online version at the Perseus Digital Library.
- Tzetzes, John, Book of Histories, Book VII-VIII translated by Vasiliki Dogani from the original Greek of T. Kiessling's edition of 1826. Online version at theio.com
