= Hamadryad =

Greek mythological being

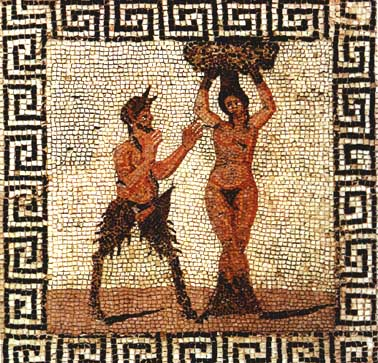
Tile mosaic of Pan and a Hamadryad, found in Pompeii

In Greek mythology, a Hamadryad or Hamadryas (/hæməˈdraɪ.æd/; Ancient Greek: ἁμαδρυάς, pl: ἁμαδρυάδες, romanized: Hamadryás, pl: Hamadryádes) is a tree nymph. They are born bonded to a certain tree on which their life depends. Some maintain that a Hamadryad is the tree itself, with a normal dryad being simply the indwelling entity, or spirit, of the tree. If the tree should die, the Hamadryad associated with it would die as well. For this reason, both dryads and the other gods would punish mortals (such as King Erysichthon) who harmed trees.

== Etymology ==
The name of the Hamadryades was compounded from the ancient Greek words háma (ἅμα, 'together, concurrently') and dryás (δρυάς, 'tree, wood nymph'). Because of this, the word contains the notion that the life of a Hamadryas is concurrent with that of its tree.

== Mythology ==
The notion that there were nymphs whose lives were inextricably tied to those of particular trees appears in the Homeric Hymn to Aphrodite, which was possibly composed in the first half of the 7th century BC. The hymn describes the trees with which the nymphs are connected as beautiful, "flourishing", and tall; according to S. Douglas Olson, these attributes used to characterise the trees are important attributes of the nymphs themselves.

There are multiple stories in which a hero comes across a hamadryad; this hero sometimes chooses to protect her tree, earning himself a reward, and sometimes harms the tree, for which he is punished. In a fragment from the writings of the 5th-century BC historiographer Charon of Lampsacus, the hero Rhoecus saved an oak tree, for which its nymph offered him any reward; he chose sex, but was eventually maimed by her on account of speaking foully. According to Apollonius of Rhodes, the father of Paraebius had, as a young man, damaged the tree belonging to a nymph. He and his family consequently suffered from a curse; Paraebius, seeking the advice of the seer Phineus, was told to make sacrifices to the nymph.

== List of Hamadryads ==
The second-to-third-century AD writer Athenaeus, citing Pherenicus, writes that Oxylus and Hamadryas were the parents of the hamadryads Karya ('nut'), Balanos ('acorn'), Kraneia ('cornel'), Morea ('oleaster'), Aigeiros ('poplar'), Ptelea ('elm'), Ampelos ('vine'), and Syke/Sykea ('fig'). Figures described as hamadryads in other sources include Atlanteia, Chrysopeleia, Phoebe, Byblis, and Dryope.

== Scientific names ==
The mother, Hamadryas, is immortalized in three scientific names, two of which are still valid: the generic name of the cracker butterfly, the specific name of the hamadryas baboon, and the original (but no longer valid) genus name of the king cobra (originally Hamadryas hannah, now Ophiophagus hannah). The cracker butterfly is more arboreal than most butterflies, as it commonly camouflages itself on trees. It feeds on sap, rotting fruit and dung. The hamadryas baboon is one of the least arboreal monkeys, but was the most common monkey in Hellenic lands. The king cobra is sometimes considered arboreal or semi-arboreal, and is also referred to by the common name "hamadryad", especially in older literature.

== See also ==
- Querquetulanae, Roman nymphs of the oak
- Plant soul, the soul of a plant
- Dryad
- The Deipnosophists, or, Banquet of the Learned of Athenaeus presented online by the University of Wisconsin Digital Collections Center
