= Argalus =

King of Sparta

In Greek mythology, King Argalus (Ancient Greek: Ἄργαλος) was a leader of the Lacedaemonid Greeks from the age of legend, now treated as being the Bronze Age in Greece.

== Mythology ==
Argalus was the eldest son and heir of King Amyklas of Sparta, possibly by his wife, Diomede, daughter of Lapithes. Through this parentage, he was considered to be the brother of King Cynortes (his successor), Hyacinthus, Polyboea, Laodamia (or Leanira), Harpalus, Hegesandre, and in other versions, of Daphne. Argalus was also said to be the father of King Oebalus.

Regnal titles
Preceded by Amyclas	King of Sparta ? - ? BC	Succeeded by Cynortas
