= Leanira =

In Greek mythology, Leanira (Ancient Greek: Λεάνειρα, romanized: Leáneira), also known as Laodamia, was a Spartan princess who later became an Arcadian queen.

== Mythology ==
Leanira was the daughter King Amyclas and possibly Diomede, daughter of Lapithes. Through this parentage, she was considered the sister of Argalus, Cynortes, Hyacinthus, Harpalus, Hegesandra, Polyboea, and in other versions, of Daphne.

Later on, Leaneira married King Arcas, son of Callisto and Zeus. According to the mythographer Apollodorus, the couple had two children, Elatus and Apheidas. A scholion on Euripides' Orestes adds Azan to this list, while the geographer Pausanias also mentions Triphylus as their child. The former two sons divided Arcadia after the demise of their father.
