= Cynortas =

King of Sparta in Greek mythology

In Greek mythology, Cynortas (/sɪˈnɔːrtəs/; Ancient Greek: Κυνόρτας) or Cynortes (/sɪˈnɔːrtiːz/; Ancient Greek: Κυνόρτης) or Cynortus was a king of Sparta.

== Family ==
Cynortas was the son of King Amyclas of Sparta and Queen Diomede, and thus brother to King Argalus, Hyacinthus, Laodamia (or Leanira), Hegesandre, Harpalus, Polyboea and in other versions, of Daphne. He was the father of Oebalus or of Perieres, who either succeeded to the throne.

== Mythology ==
After the death of his brother Argalus, Cynortes inherited the kingdom and eventually became the king of Sparta. His tomb was shown near Scias at Sparta.

Regnal titles
Preceded by Argalus	King of Sparta	Succeeded by Oebalus

== See also ==
- List of kings of Sparta
