= Diomede =

Set of female names from Greek mythology

Diomede (/ˌdaɪ.əˈmiːdiː/; Ancient Greek: Διομήδη Diomēdē) is the name of four women in Greek mythology:

- Diomede, daughter of Xuthus. She married Deioneus, king of Phocis, and was the mother of Cephalus, Actor, Aenetus, Phylacus and Asterodia.(Interwiki: bn, ja)
- Diomede or Diomedes, a Lapith and daughter of Lapithes and possibly of Orsinome. She married King Amyclas of Sparta and became the mother of King Argalus, King Cynortes, Hyacinthus, Polyboea, Laodamia (or Leanira), Harpalus, Hegesandre and, in other versions, of Daphne.
- Diomede, according to Homer, the daughter of one Phorbas, taken by Achilles as captive from Lesbos. She is named in the Iliad as the captive that Achilles lays with after he turns away the embassy of Ajax and Odysseus.
- Diomede, wife of Pallas and mother of Euryalus, who fought at Troy. Nothing else is known about her.
