= Hyacinth (mythology) =

Lover of Apollo in Greek mythology

- Divine hero of Sparta
- Member of the Spartan royal family
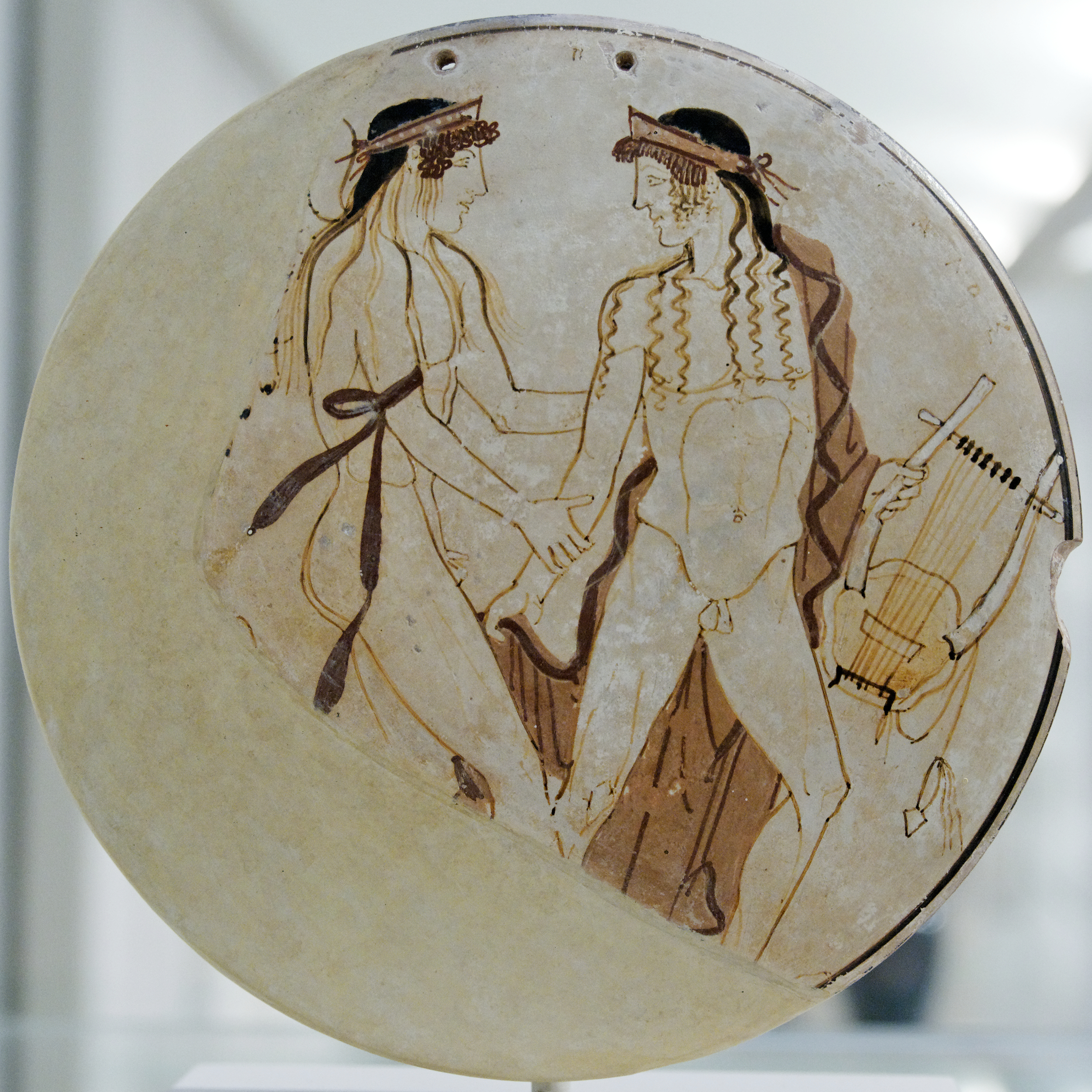
- A winged deity and a youth, likely Zephyrus and Hyacinthus, on an Attic white-ground bobbin, Metropolitan Museum of Art (c. 460–450 BC).
- Other names: Hyacinthus, Hyakinthos, Amyclides
- Major cult centre: Lacedaemon
- Abode: Sparta, Mount Olympus

Genealogy
- Parents: Amyclas and Diomede or Oebalus or Clio and Pierus
- Siblings: Argalus, Cynortas, Laodamia, Harpalus, Hegesandra, Polyboea, Daphne, Rhagus
- Consort: Apollo, Zephyrus, Boreas, Thamyris

Hyacinth (/ˈhaɪəsɪnθ/) or Hyacinthus (/hy.á.kin.tʰos/ or /iˈa.cin.θos/; Ancient Greek: Ὑάκινθος, romanized: Huákinthos) is a deified hero and a lover of Apollo in Greek mythology. His cult at Amyclae southwest of Sparta dates from the Mycenaean era. The hero is mythically linked to local cults and identified with Apollo. In the Classical period, a temenos (sanctuary) grew up around what was alleged to be his burial mound, which was located at the feet of a statue of Apollo. He is described as a Spartan prince who was also admired by Zephyrus, Boreas, and Thamyris. Scholars suggest he was originally a pre-Hellenic vegetation deity representing the natural cycle of decay and renewal. He is variously said to be the son of Clio, one of the Muses, by Pierus, Oebalus, or Amyclas.

== Family ==
Hyacinth was given various parentage, providing local links, as the son of Clio and Pierus, or King Oebalus of Sparta, or of king Amyclus of Sparta, progenitor of the people of Amyclae, dwellers about Sparta. As the youngest and most beautiful son of Amyclas and Diomede, daughter of Lapithes, Hyacinth was the brother of Cynortus, Argalus, Polyboea, Laodamia (or Leanira), Harpalus, Hegesandra, and in other versions, of Daphne.

== Mythology ==
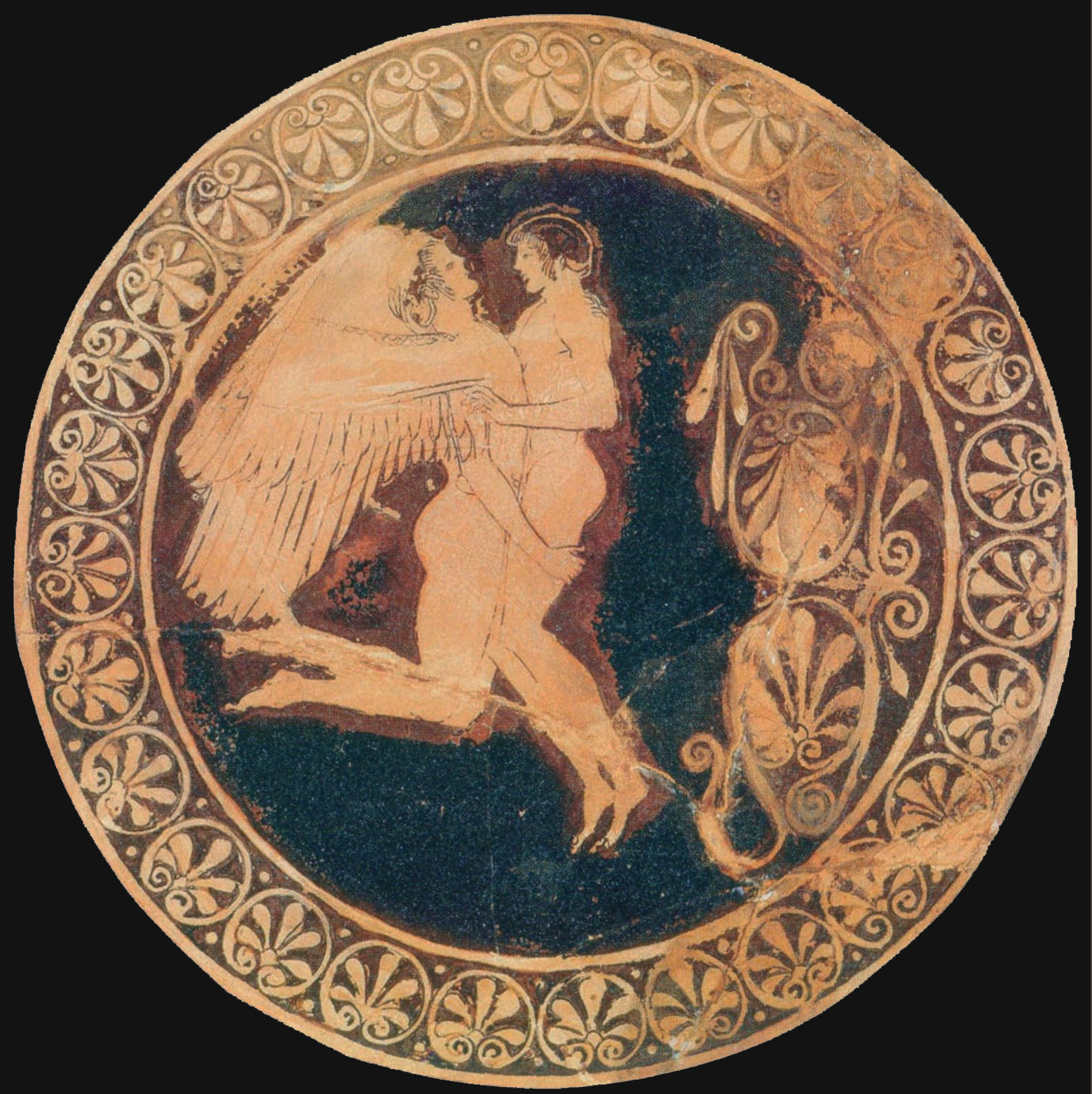
Hyacinthus and the West Wind engaging in intercrural sex on a red-figure vase (5th century BCE)

In Greek mythology, Hyacinthus was a Spartan prince of remarkable beauty and a lover of the god of prophecy Apollo. He was also admired by Zephyrus, the god of the west wind, Boreas, the god of the north wind, and a mortal man named Thamyris. Hyacinthus chose Apollo over the others. He visited all of Apollo's sacred lands with the god in a chariot drawn by swans. So fiercely was Apollo in love with Hyacinthus that he abandoned his sanctuary in Delphi to enjoy Hyacinthus' company by the river Eurotas. He taught Hyacinthus the use of the bow and the lyre, the art of prophecy, and exercises in the gymnasium.

One day they decided to have a friendly competition by taking turns to throw the discus, which resulted in Apollo accidentally killing Hyacinthus. In Ovid’s telling of the story, the lovers stripped and oiled themselves for the contest. Apollo threw first, with a strength so great that the discus split the clouds in the sky. Eager to retrieve the discus, Hyacinthus ran behind it to catch it. But as it hit the ground, the discus bounced back, hitting Hyacinthus' head and wounding him fatally. An alternative version of the myth holds Zephyrus responsible for the death of Hyacinthus. Jealous that Hyacinthus preferred the radiant Apollo, Zephyrus blew Apollo's quoit boisterously off course to kill Hyacinthus.

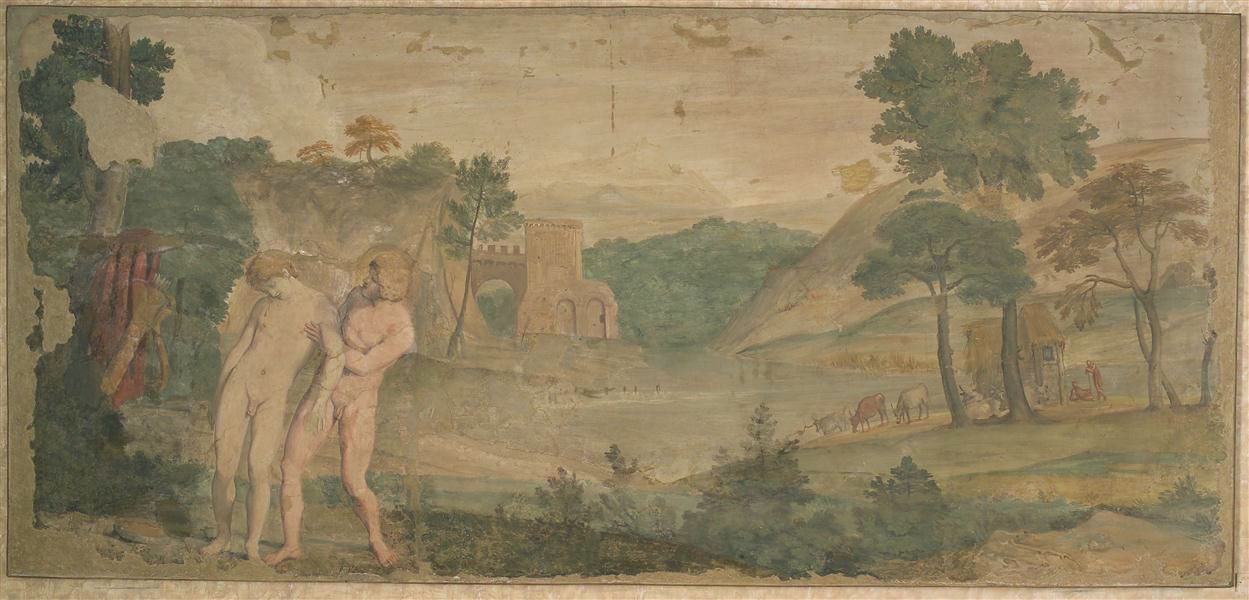
Apollo and Hyacinth (1603-1604) by Domenichino

Apollo's face turned pale as he held his dying lover in his arms. In a poem by Bion of Smyrna, Apollo used all sorts of herbs and even tried giving ambrosia to heal Hyacinthus' wound, but it was futile, for he could not cure the wound inflicted by the Fates. Apollo wept for Hyacinthus' death and expressed his wish to become a mortal to join the Spartan boy in his death. That being unachievable because of his immortality, Apollo promised that he would always remind himself of Hyacinthus through his songs and the music of his lyre. He created a flower from Hyacinthus' spilled blood, the hyacinth, and inscribed on its petals the words of lamentation, "AI AI" – "alas". However, based on its ancient description, the flower Hyacinthus turned into is not the modern plant bearing that name.

The Bibliotheca said Thamyris, who showed romantic feelings towards Hyacinthus, was the first man to have loved another man.

=== Apotheosis and Hyacinthia ===
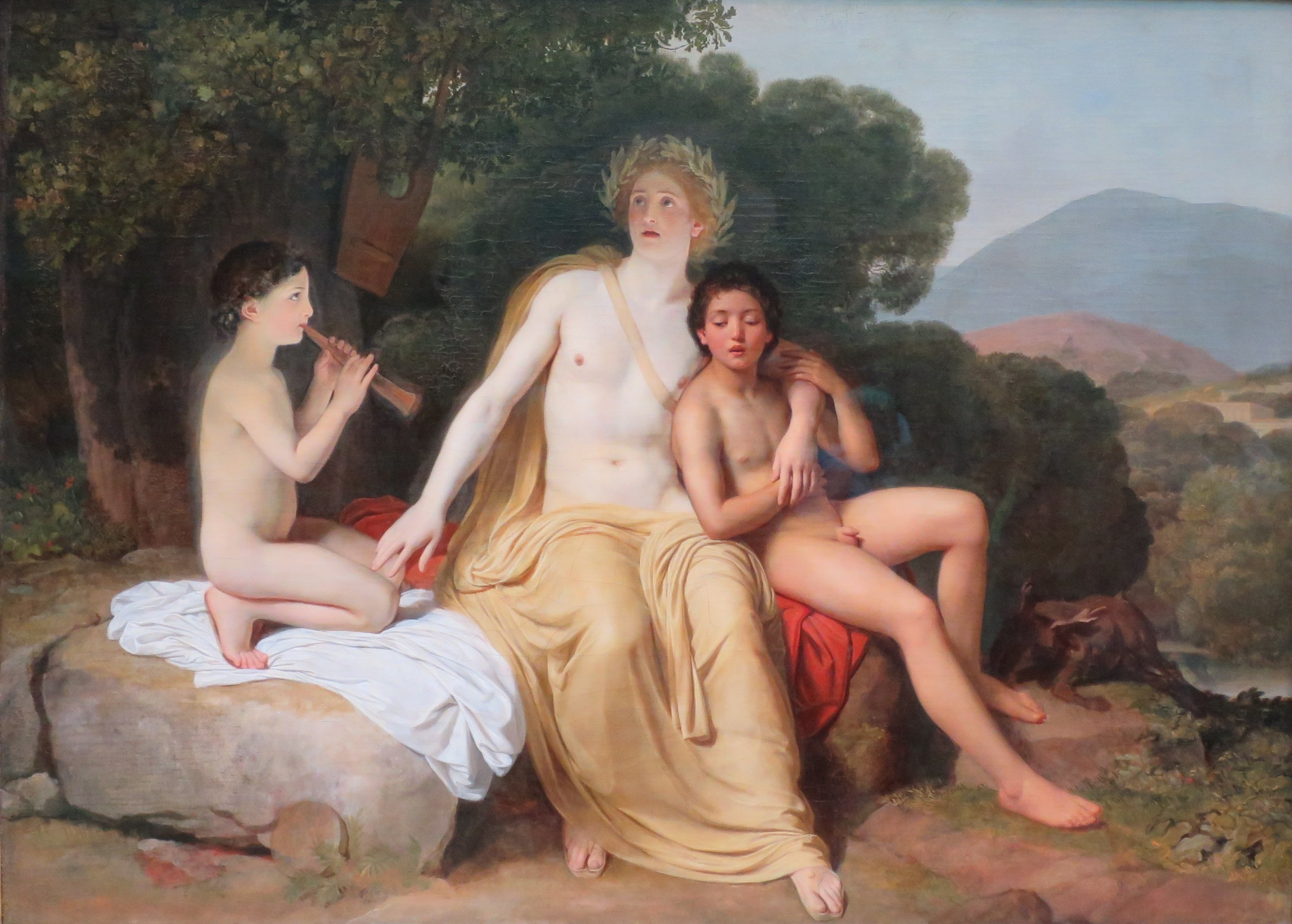
Apollo, Hyacinth and Cyparissus singing and playing by Alexander Ivanov, 1831–1834

Hyacinthus was eventually resurrected by Apollo and attained immortality. Pausanias has recorded that the throne of Apollo in Sparta had the depiction of bearded Hyacinthus being taken to heaven along with Polyboea by Aphrodite, Athena and Artemis.

Hyacinthus was the tutelary deity of one of the principal Spartan festivals, Hyacinthia, celebrated in the Spartan month of Hyacinthia (in early summer). The festival lasted three days, one day of mourning for the death of Hyacinth, and the last two celebrating his rebirth, though the division of honours is a subject for scholarly controversy. On the first day, people mourned his death by eating as little as possible and abstaining from singing songs, contrary to all the other festivals of Apollo. On the second day, choirs of boys and young men sang some of their national songs and danced. As for the girls, some were carried in decorated wicker carts and others paraded in chariots pulled by two horses, which they raced. Citizens entertained their friends and even their own servants. Every year the Laconian women wove a chiton for Apollo and presented it to him, a tradition similar to the peplos offered to Athena at Athens upon the occasion of the Panathenaic Games. Less is known about the third day, indicating that probably mysteries were held. It is described as "merry midnight festival".

So important was this festival that the Amyclaeans, even when they had taken the field against an enemy, always returned home on the approach of the season of the Hyacinthia, and the Lacedaemonians on one occasion concluded a truce of forty days with the town of Eira merely to be able to return home and celebrate the national festival. After the treaty with Sparta of 421 BC, the Athenians, to show their goodwill towards Sparta, promised every year to attend the celebration of the Hyacinthia.

== Cults and attributes ==
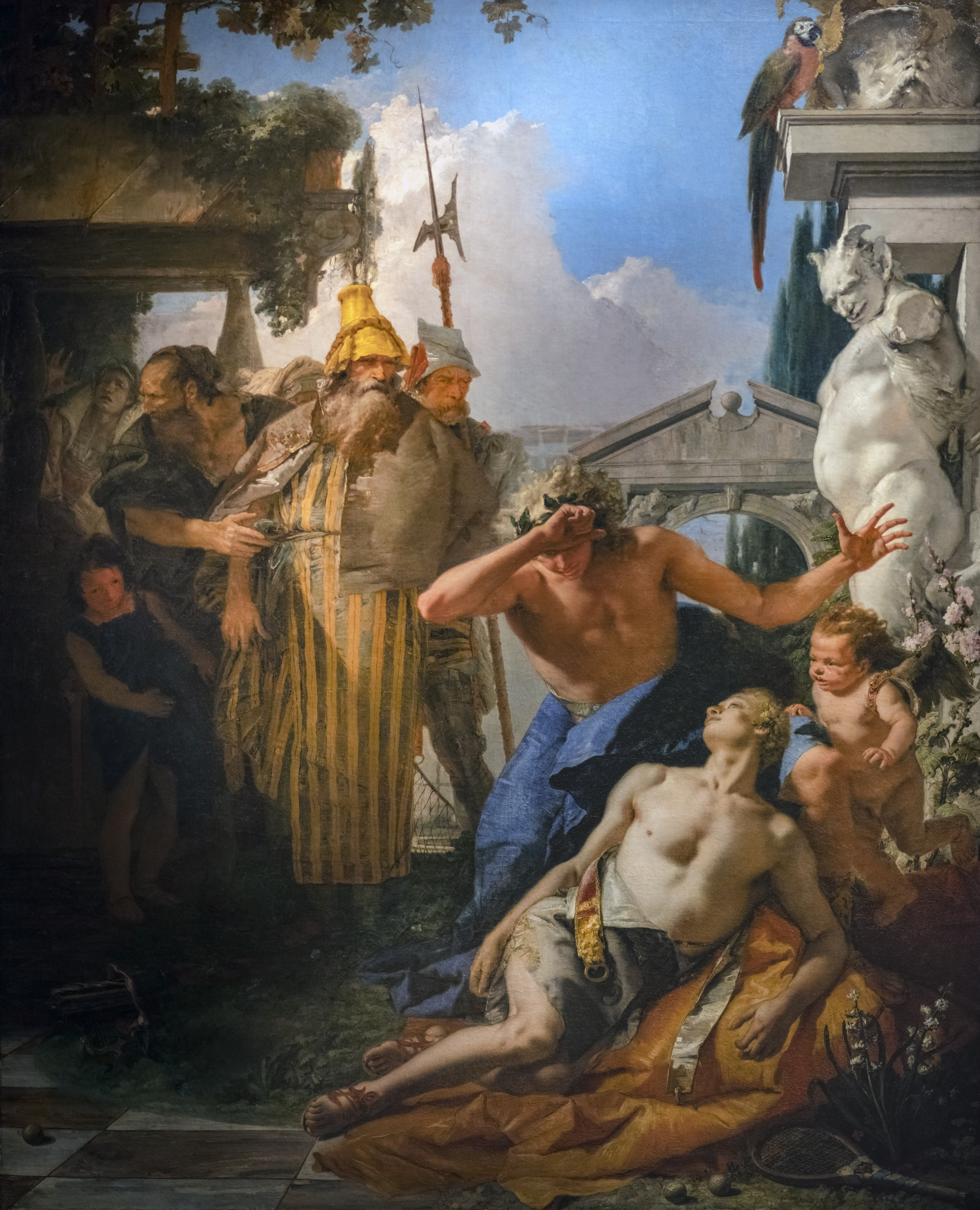
The Death of Hyacinth (1752–1753) by Giovanni Battista Tiepolo. Museo Thyssen-Bornemisza, Madrid.

Hyacinthus had a shrine in Amyclea, which he came to share with Apollo. Various scholars agree that Hyacinthus was a pre-Hellenic nature god, and certain aspects of his own cult suggest that he was a chthonic vegetation deity whose cults were merged with Apollo's. Nilsson says that Hyacinthus is a Cretan word, and its pre-Hellenic origin is indicated by the suffix -nth. Hyacinthus personifies the sprouting vegetation in spring, which is killed by the heat of the summer. The apotheosis of Hyacinthus indicates that, after attaining godhood, he represented the natural cycle of decay and renewal.

The fact that at Tarentum a Hyacinthus tomb is ascribed by Polybius to Apollo Hyacinthus (not Hyacinthus) has led some to think that the personalities are one, and that the hero is merely an emanation from the god; confirmation is sought in the Apolline appellation τετράχειρ, alleged by Hesychius to have been used in Laconia, and assumed to describe a composite figure of Apollo-Hyacinthus. Against this theory is the essential difference between the two figures. Hyacinthus is a chthonian vegetation god whose worshippers are afflicted and sorrowful; though interested in vegetation, Apollo's death is not celebrated in any ritual, his worship is joyous and triumphant, and finally, the Amyclean Apollo is specifically the god of war and song. Moreover, Pausanias describes the monument at Amyclae as consisting of a rude figure of Apollo standing on an altar-shaped base that formed the tomb of Hyacinthus. Into the latter offerings were put for the hero before gifts were made to the god.

Hyacinthus was gifted a swan chariot by Apollo and appeared in ancient arts riding it, either to meet Apollo or to escape the advances of Zephyrus. Swans were believed to be the birds of Hyperborea, a mystical land of eternal spring and immortality, to which Apollo himself traveled every winter on a chariot drawn by swans. This association of Hyacinth with swans places him in close connection to Hyperborean Apollo and spring. It is suggested that Hyacinthus would have spent the winter months in the underworld, or more suitably Hyperborea and returning to earth in the spring when the hyacinth flower blooms.

According to classical interpretations, his myth is a metaphor of the death and rebirth of nature. The festival Hyacinthia included the initiatory rites, that is, the initiation of youths into adulthood.

=== Attributes ===
The flower hyacinth that rose from Hyacinth's blood is said to have had a deep blue or purple hue and a sign resembling the inscription "AI" on its petals, a symbol of sorrow. However, this flower has been identified with another plant, the larkspur, or an iris, or perhaps gladiolus italicus rather than what we today call hyacinth. Other divinely beloved vegetation gods who died in the flower of their youth and were vegetatively transformed include Narcissus, Cyparissus, Mecon and Adonis.

Ancient Greeks associated with Apollo a deep blue or violet precious gem called hyacinth. It was called so because its colour resembled that of the hyacinth flowers. This gem was held sacred to Apollo due to the mythological connection. The people who visited Apollo's shrine, as well as his priests and the high priestess Pythia, were required to wear this gem.

The term 'Hyacinthine hair' refers to the curly hair of Hyacinthus that resembles the curled petals of hyacinth flowers. It is often used poetically. The term could also be descriptive of the colour of the hair; either dark or deep violet. In Homer's Odyssey, Athena gives Odysseus hyacinthine hair to make him look more beautiful. Edgar Allan Poe, in the poem "To Helen", uses the same term to beautify Helen's hair.

== Gallery of Images ==
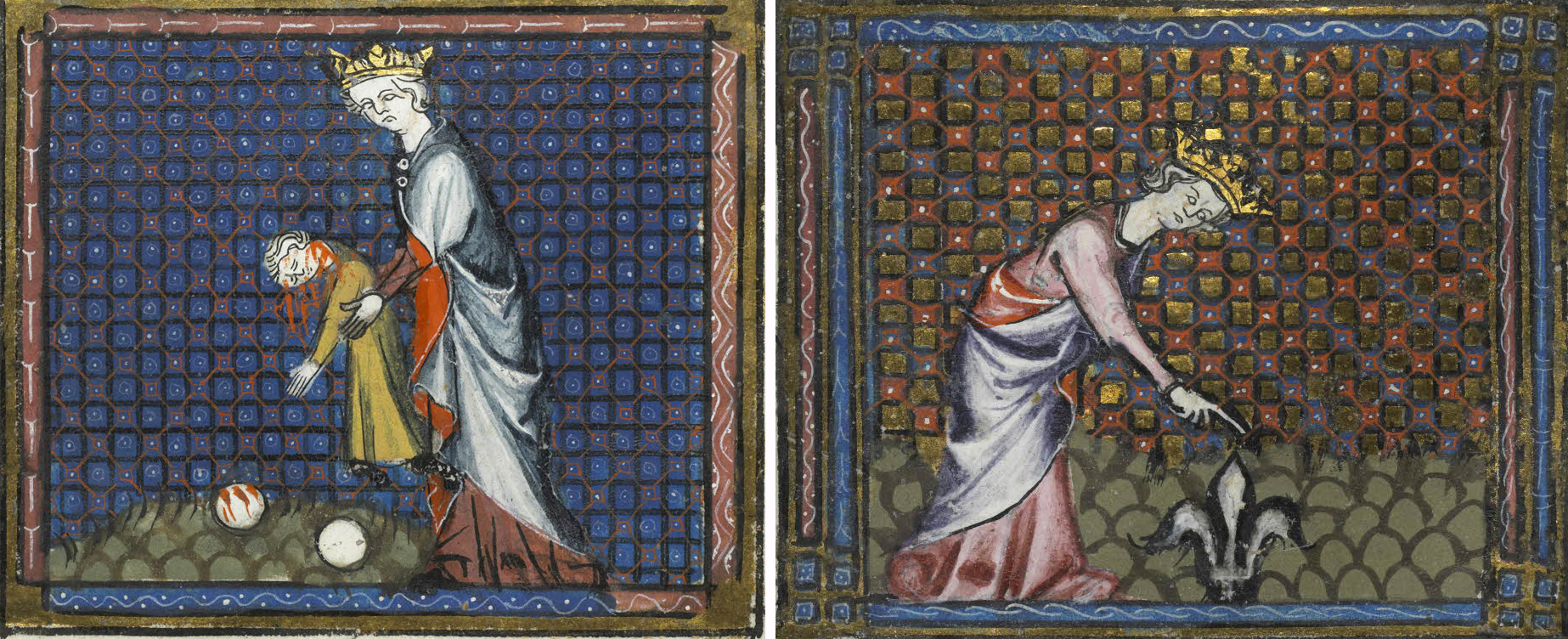
Apollo and Hyacinthus. Metamorphoses. Moralized Ovid (1325), Bibliothèque municipale, Rouen

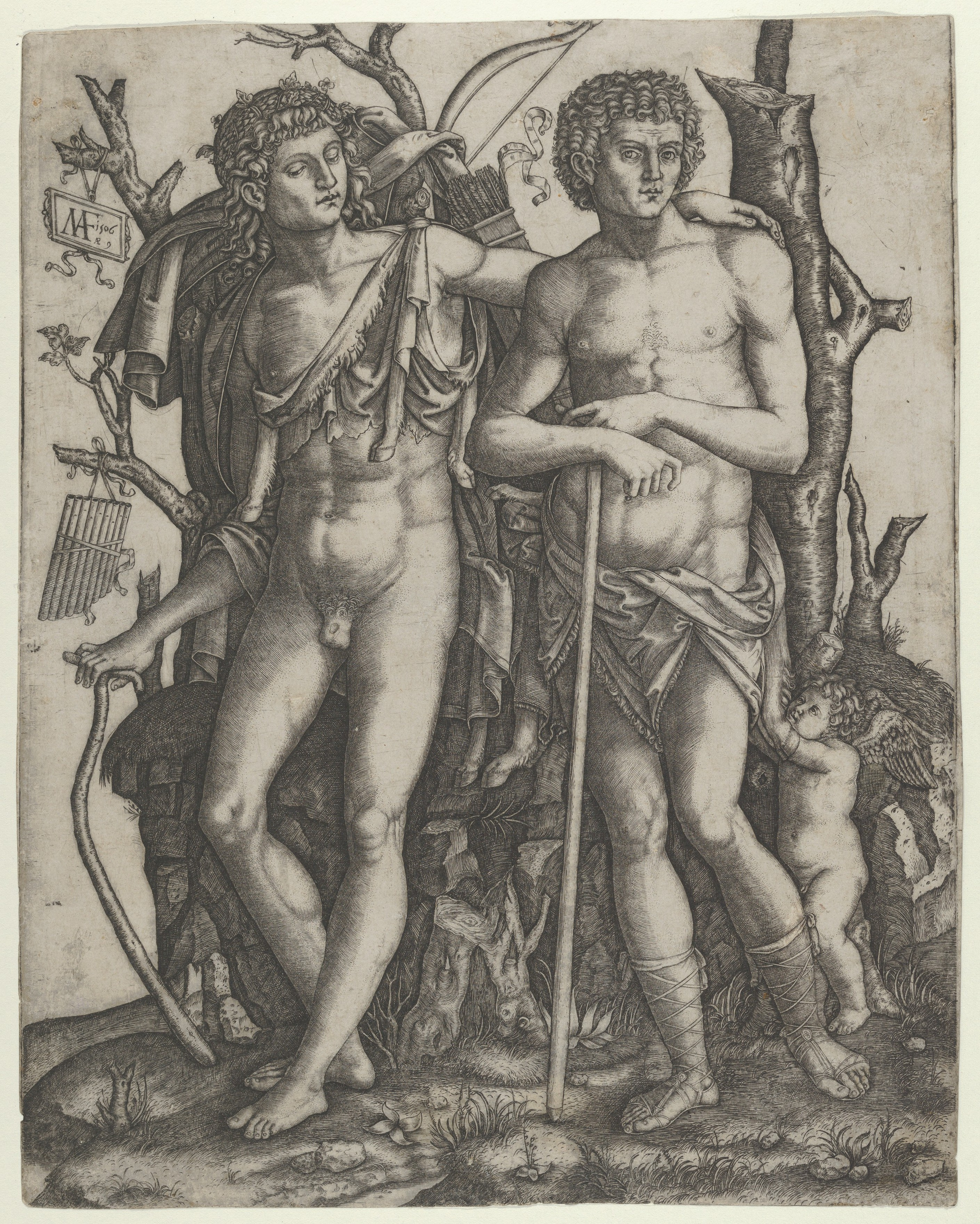
Apollo standing at the left, his hand resting on the shoulder of Hyacinthus, Cupid in the lower right, (1506), Marcantonio Raimondi

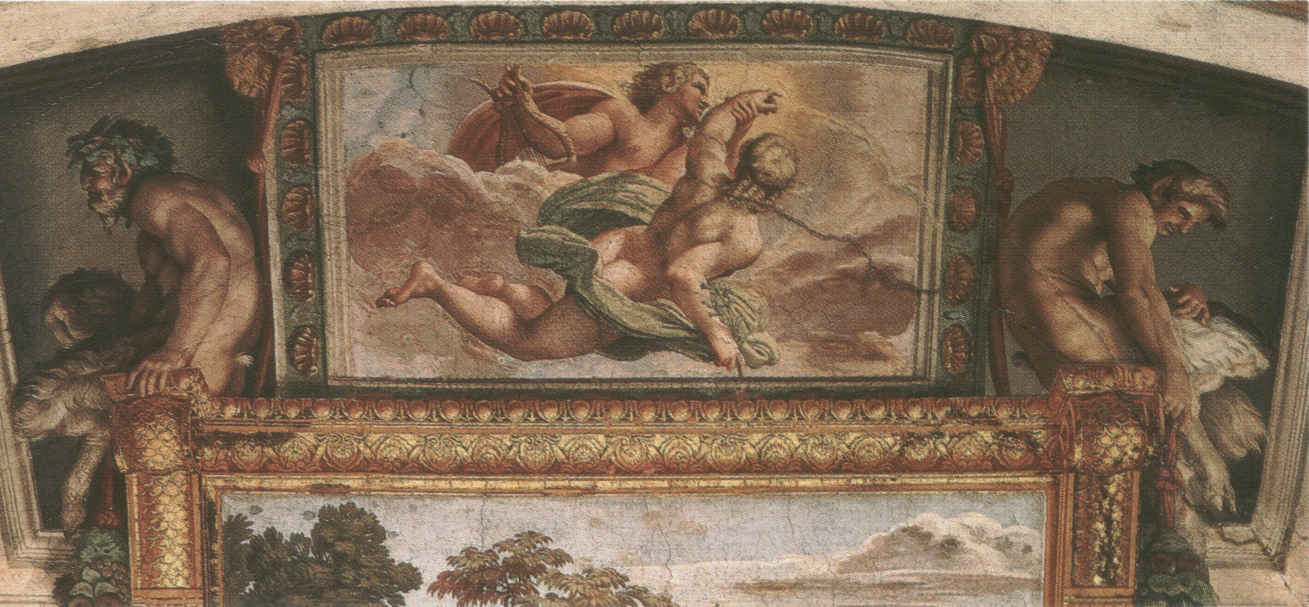
Hyacinthus Borne to the Heavens by Apollo, (1597), Annibale Carracci, Part of The Loves of the Gods

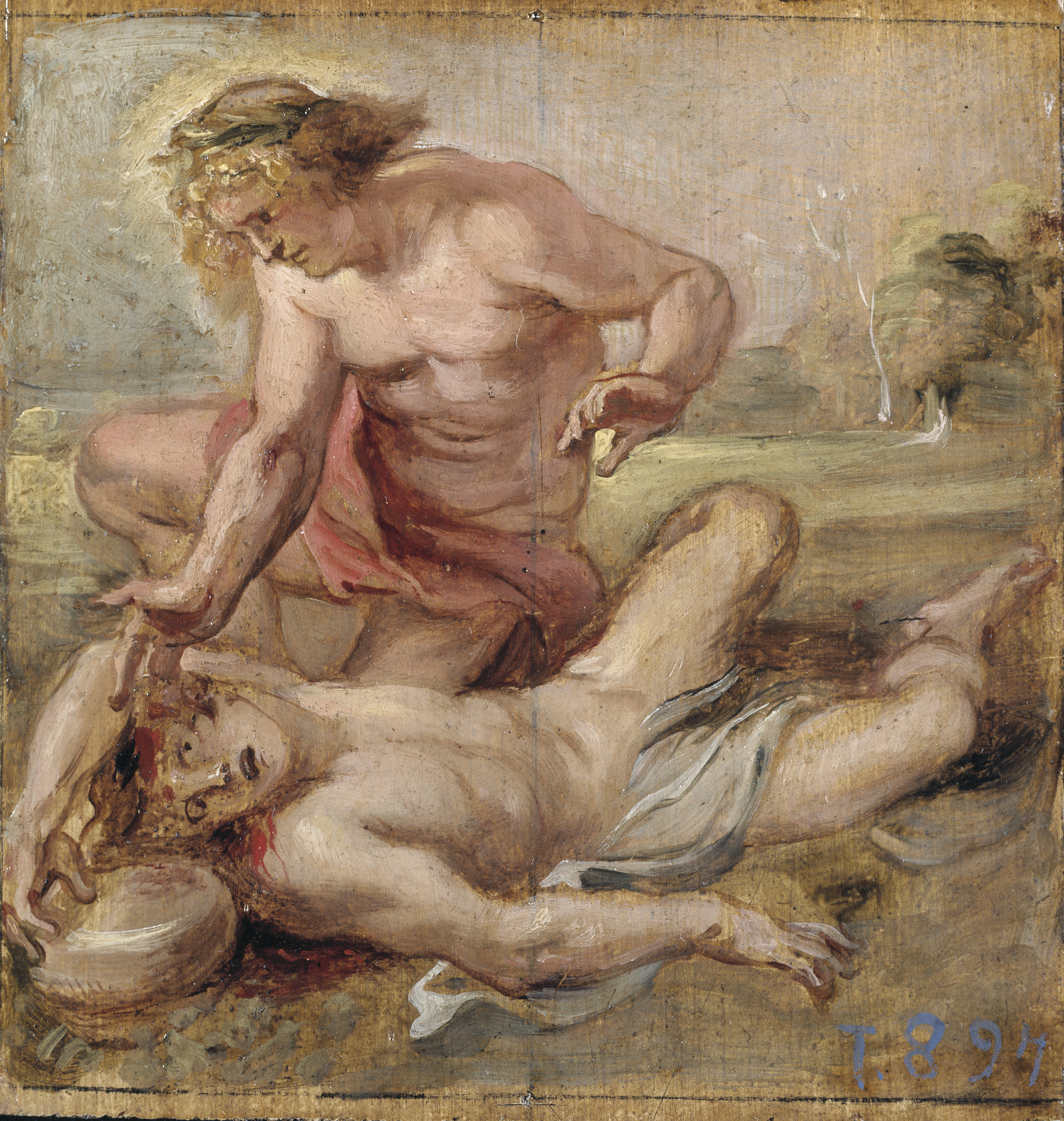
The death of Hyacinth (Ovid, Metamorphoses, X, 162-219), (c. 1636-1637), Peter Paul Rubens

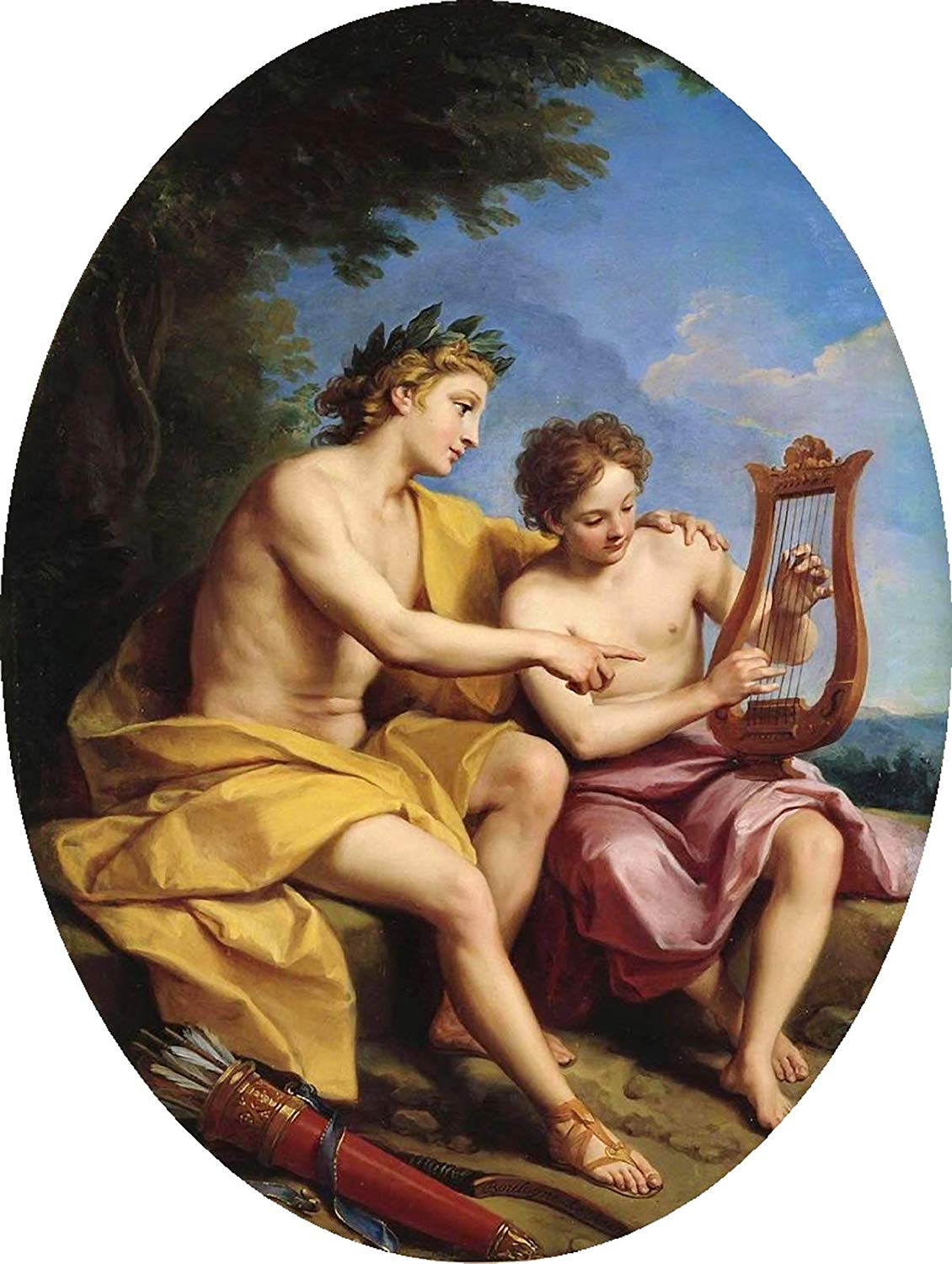
Apollo Teaching Hyacinthus to Play Lyra, (c. 1688), Louis de Boullogne

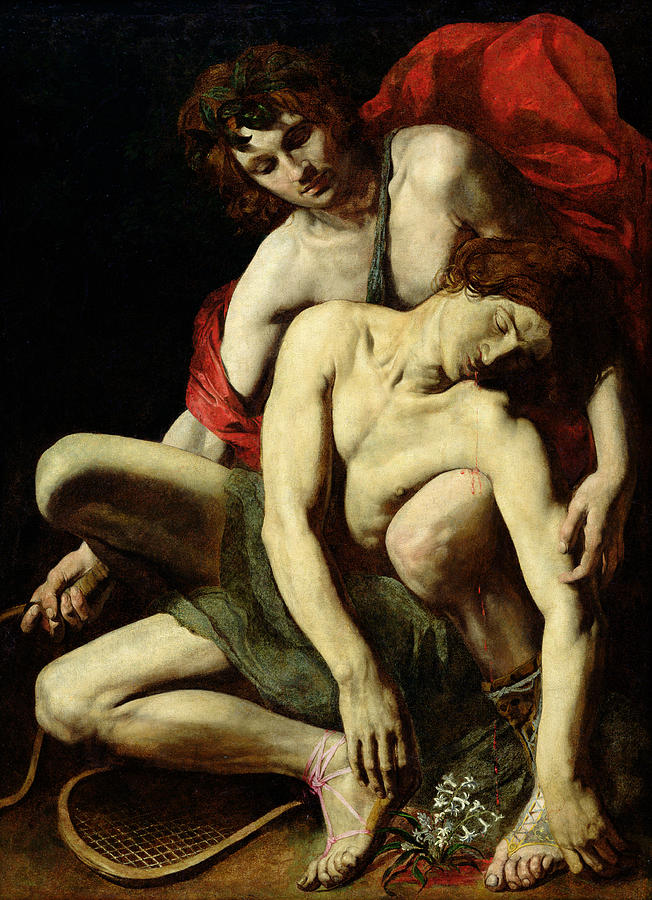
The Death of Hyacinthus, 17th Century Italian School (after Caravaggio)

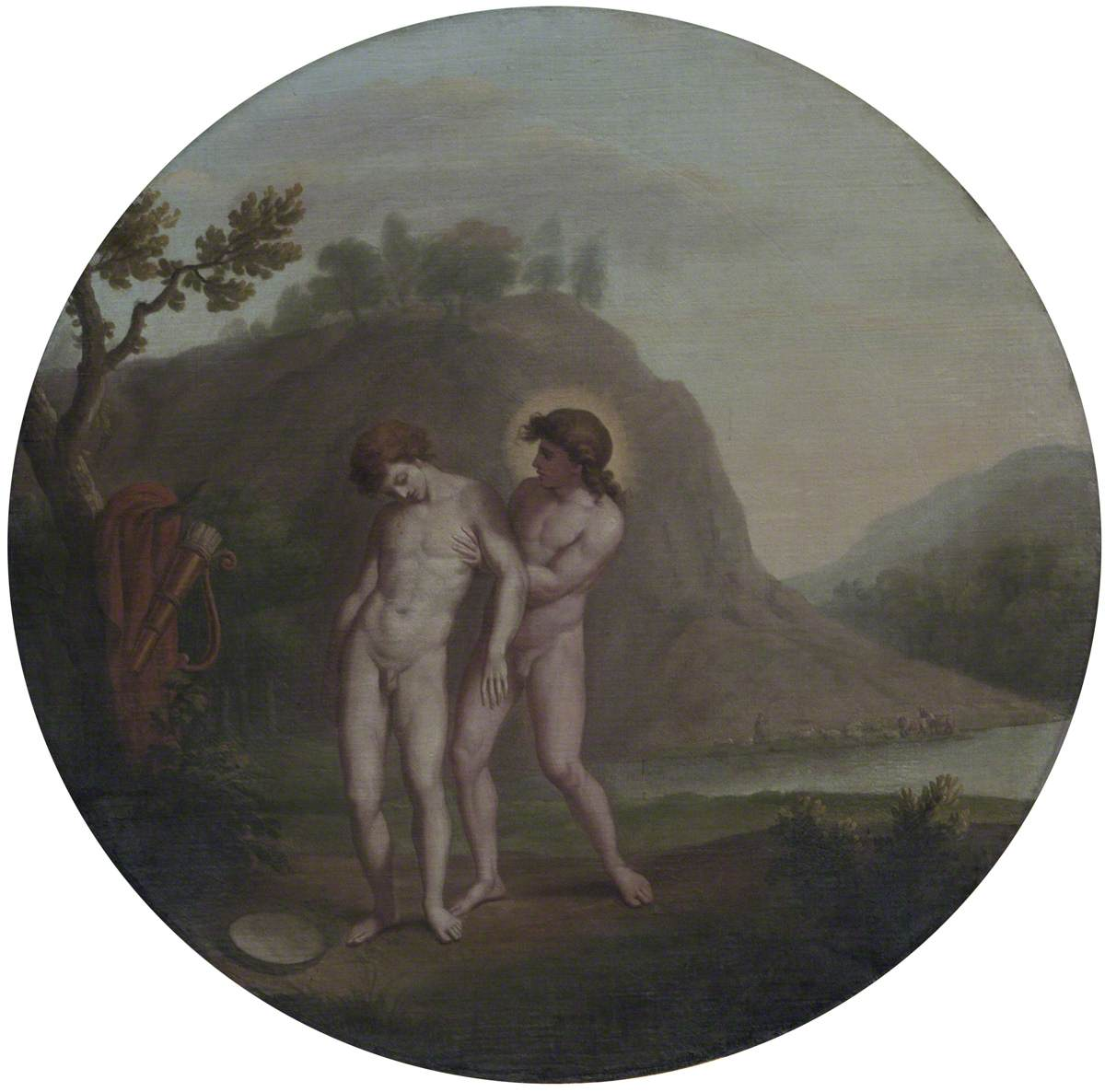
Apollo and Hyacinthus (after Domenichino), (c. 1768-1771), William Hamilton

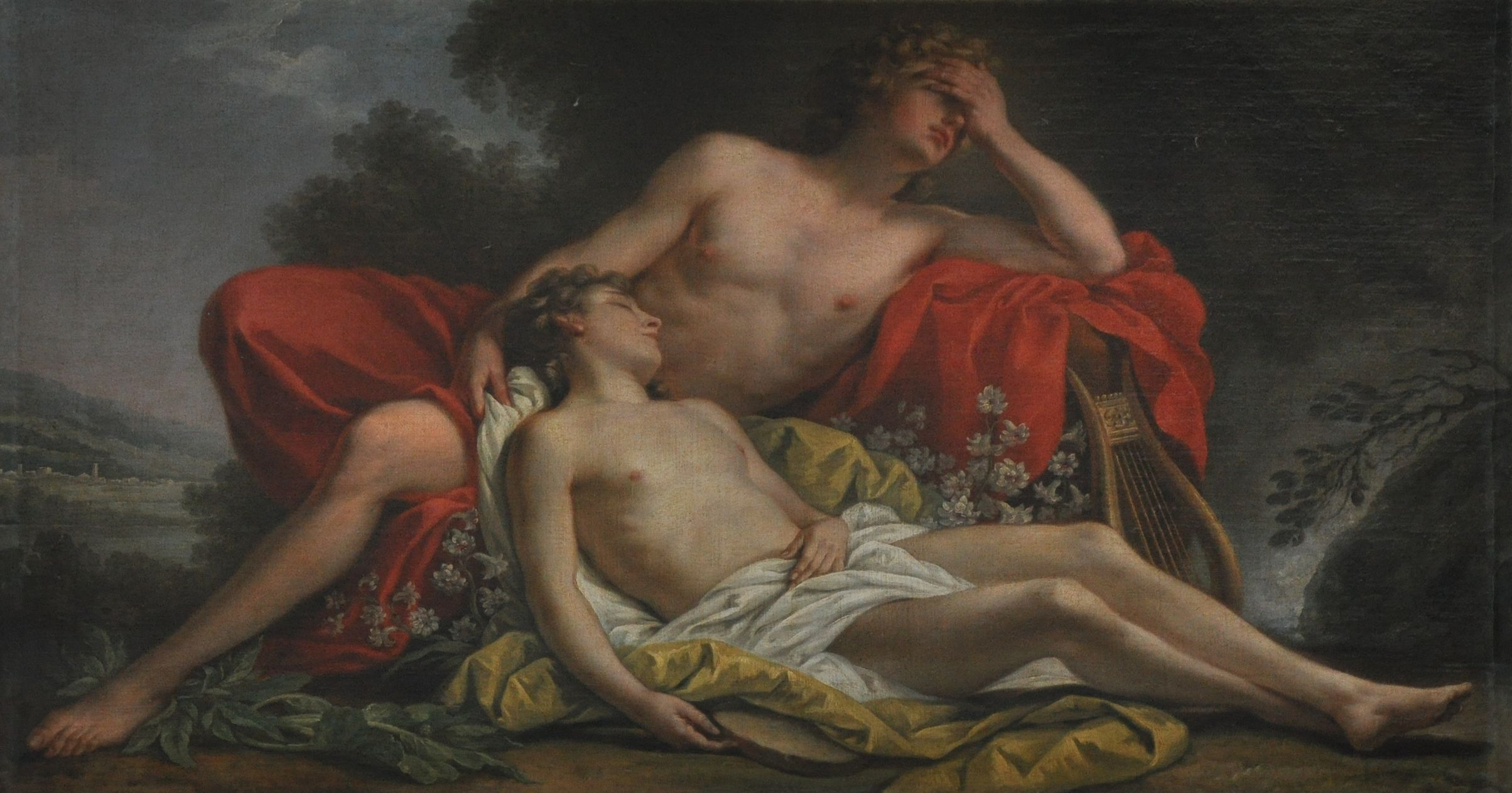
Apollo weeping for Hyacinth, or Hyacinth transformed into a flower, (1768), Nicolas-René Jollain

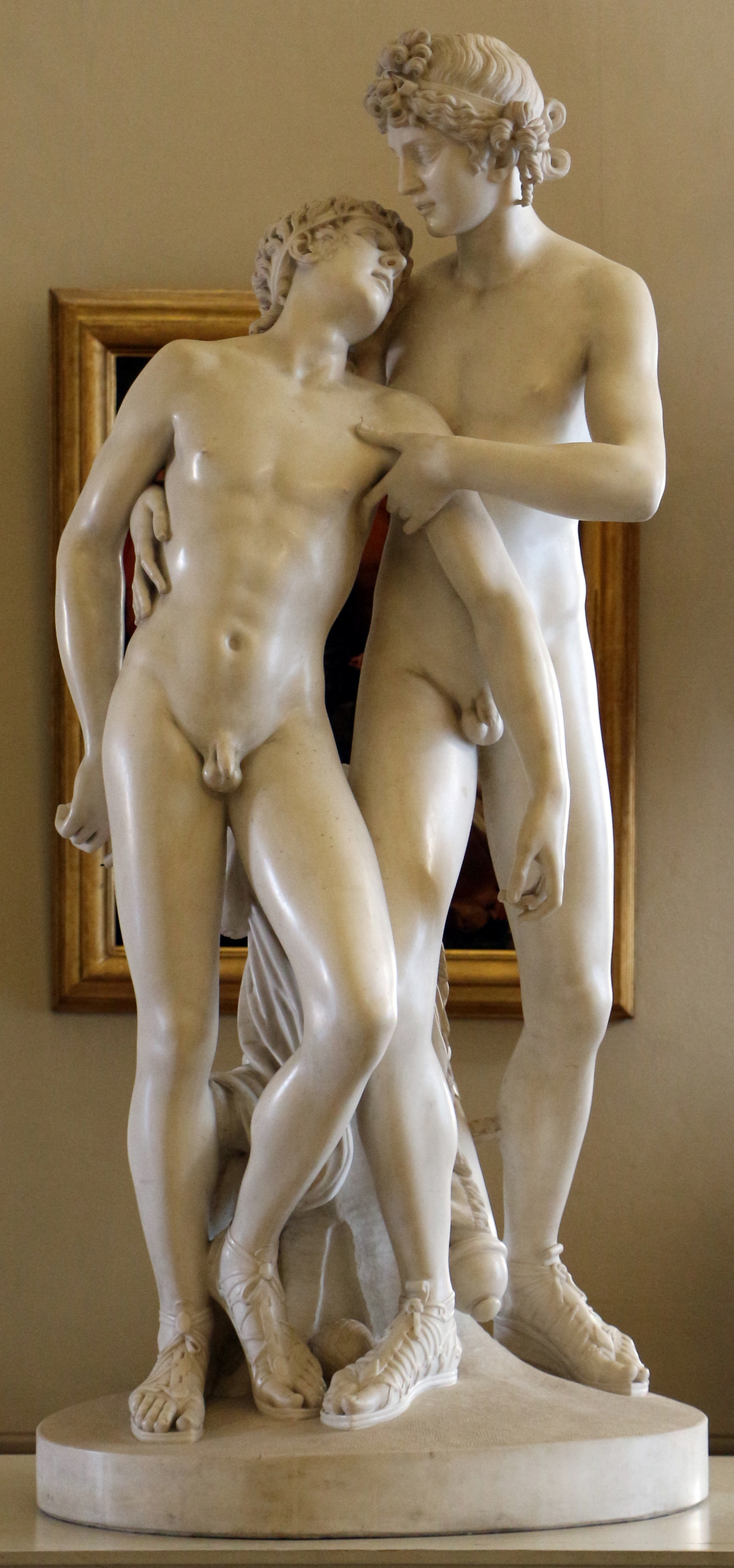
Apollo and Hyacinthus, (c. 1810), Stefano Ricci

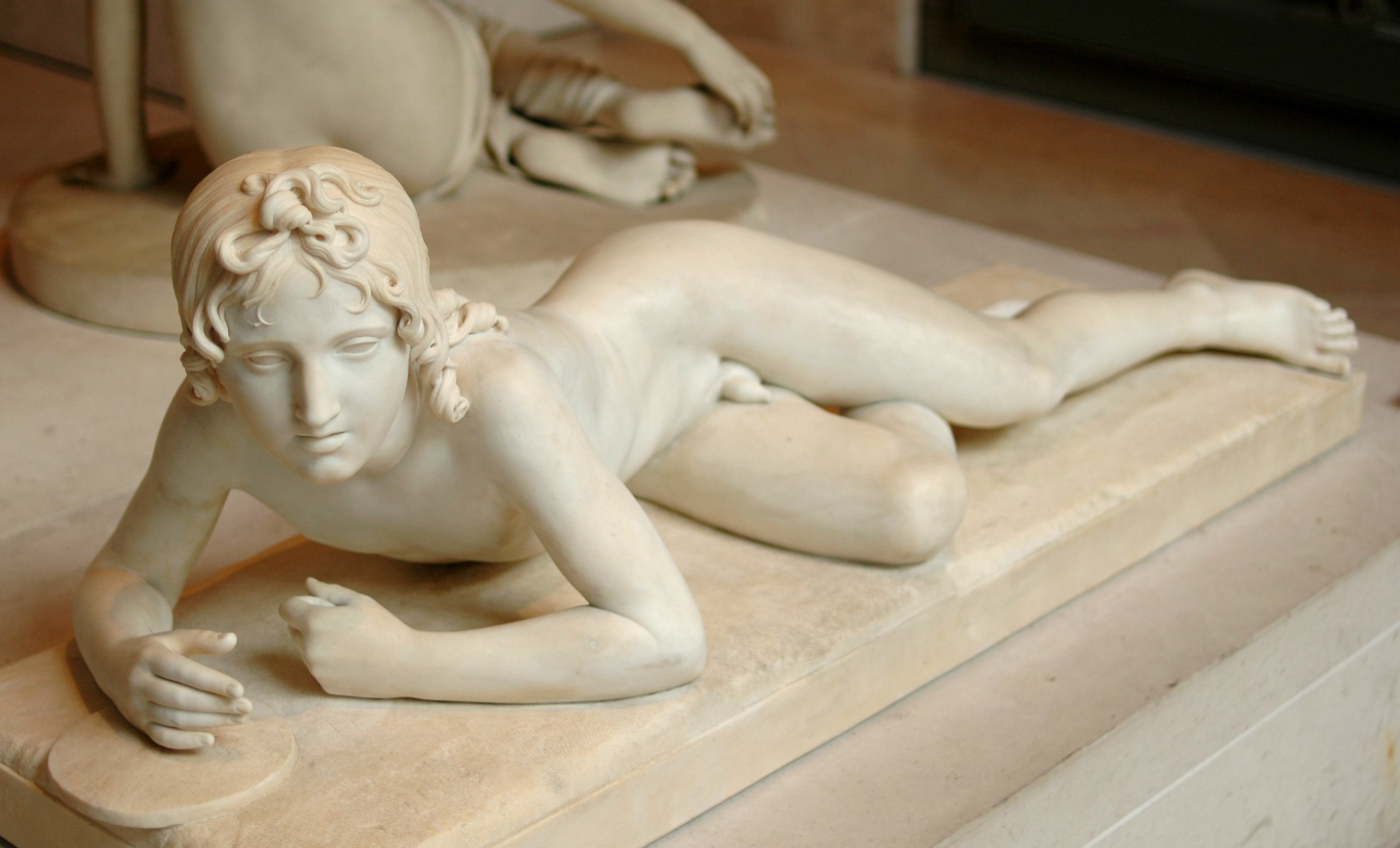
Hyacinth wounded, (1817), François Joseph Bosio

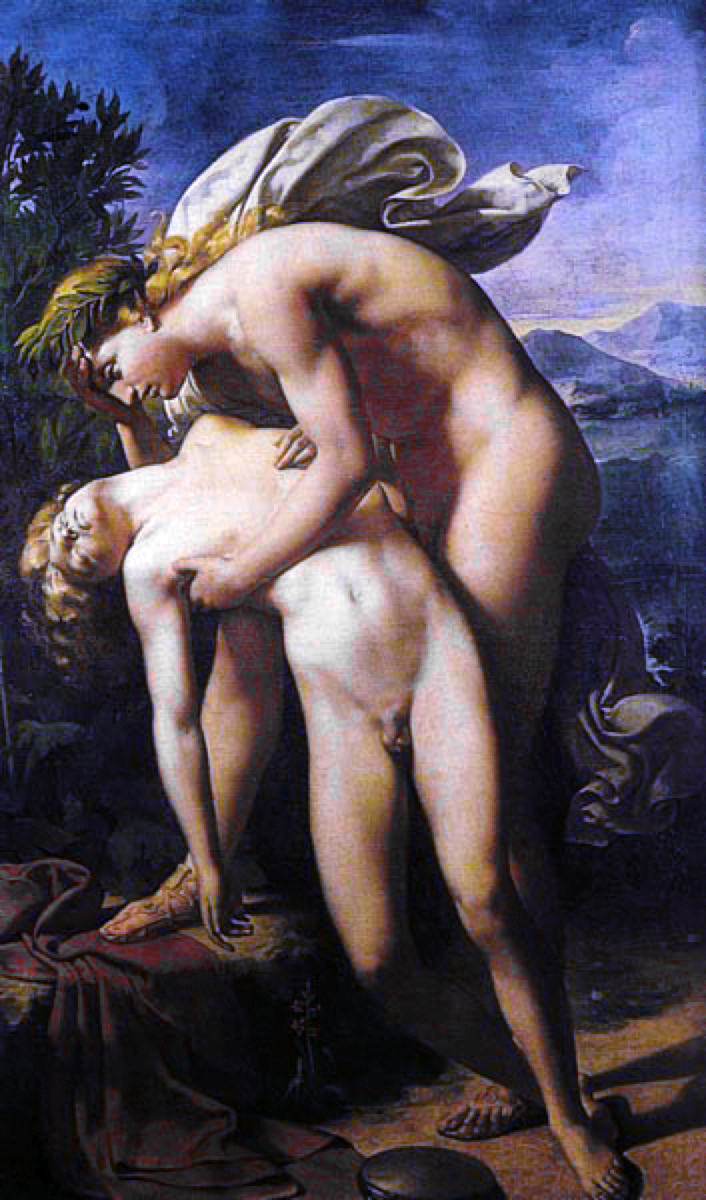
The Death of Hyacinthus, (c. 1830), Merry-Joseph Blondel

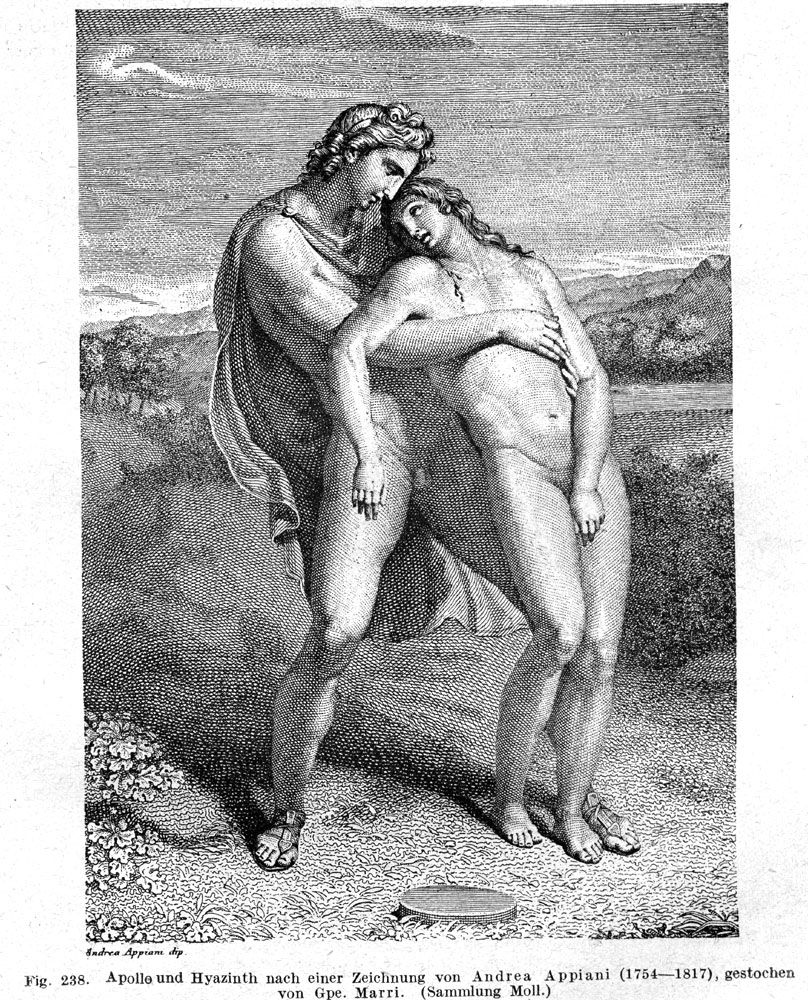
Apollo and Hyacintus (1851), (after Andrea Appiani)

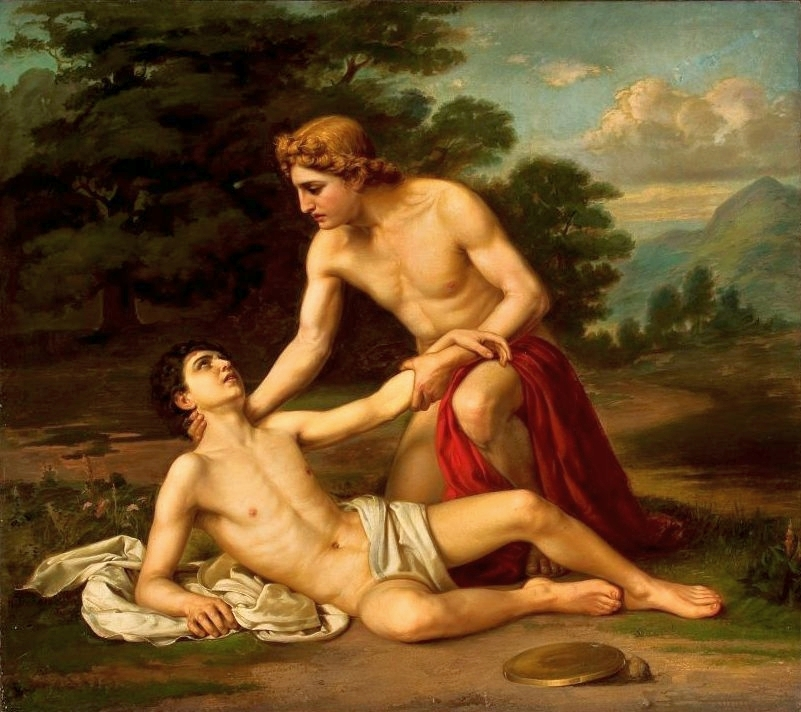
Death of Hyacinth, (c. 1850-1900), Alexander Kiselyov

== See also ==
- Apollo
- Branchus
- Cyparissus
- Apollo et Hyacinthus, an opera by Mozart
- Hyacinth, the flower named after Hyacinthus
- Larkspur, the flower suggested is the real hyacinth
