= Monimus (general) =

Monimus (/ˈmɒnəməs/; Ancient Greek: Μόνιμος; fl. 4th century BC), son of Pythion, was a Macedonian officer who espoused the cause of Olympias in her final struggle with Cassander, and was one of the last who remained faithful to her; but finding himself unable to relieve her at Pydna, he withdrew to Pella, which city he held for a time, but surrendered it to Cassander after the fall of Pydna, 316 BC. From an anecdote related by Phylarchus, it appears that he had been attached to the court of Olympias for some time.
