= Boethous =

Character in Greek mythology

In Greek mythology, Boethous (Ancient Greek: βοηθόος, romanized: Boethoos, lit. 'helper', 'assistant' or 'one who helps') or Boethos (βοηθὸς, βοηθός or βόηθος) was the Lacedaemonian son of the Pelopid Argeios from Pisa and princess Hegesandra, daughter of King Amyclas of Sparta.

== Family ==
Boethoos was the brother of Melanion and Alector. He was the father of Eteoneus, the man who helped Odysseus to return home to Ithaca.
