= Melanion (mythology) =

Greek mythological men

In Greek mythology, Melanion (/məˈlæniən/; Ancient Greek: Μελανίων, romanized: Melaníōn, lit. 'black one' or 'dark one') or Meilanion (Μειλανίων) may refer to the following characters:

- Melanion, the Lacedaemonian son of the Pelopid Argeios and Hegesandra, daughter of King Amyclas of Sparta. He was the brother of Alector and Boethoos.
- Melanion, also called Hippomenes, Arcadian son of Amphidamas and husband of Atalanta.
- Meilanion, fought in the Indian War against the army of Dionysus.
- Meilanion, son of Erylaus and Clite. He was killed by Antiphus, an Ithacan.

== See also ==
- Milanion, genus of butterflies
- Milanion Group, company producing military technology (cf. FP-5 Flamingo)
