= Aeginetes =

Mythical father of Pelias

In Greek mythology, Aeginetes (Ancient Greek: Αἰγινήτου, romanized: Aiginites, lit. 'the Aeginetan') was a son of Deritus, descendant of King Amyclas of Laconia. Through his son Pelias, Dereites was the ancestor of Patreus who founded Patras.
