= Dereites =

Father of Aeginetes in Greek mythology

In Greek mythology, Dereites (Ancient Greek: Δηρείτου) or Deritus was a member of the Lacedamonian royal family. He was son of Prince Harpalus, son of King Amyclas of Laconia. Through his son Aeginetes, Dereites was the ancestor of Patreus who founded Patras.
