= Daphnomancy =

Form of divination by burning bay laurel leaves

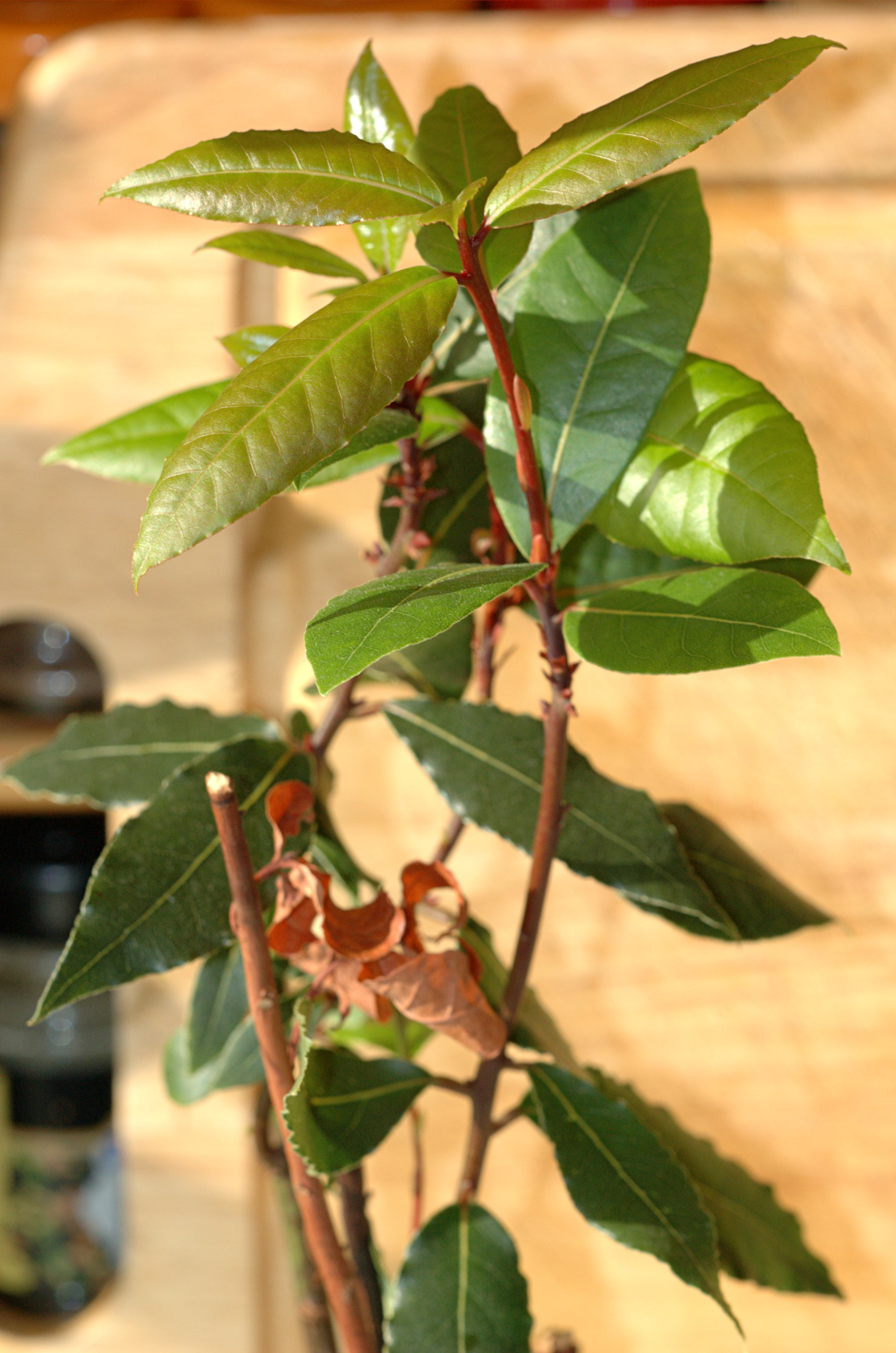
Bay Laurel plant (Laurus nobilis)

Daphnomancy is a form of pyromancy in which the future is predicted by burning bay laurel leaves. A loud crackling from the fire is a positive omen, while silence indicates a negative one.

== History and etymology ==
Daphno is thought to be a tribute to Daphne, an ancient Greek nymph who turned into the first laurel tree by Apollo. Originally, the leaves used in daphnomancy were selected from the sacred grove of Apollo. However, as time passed, the practice of daphnomancy spread to pre-Christian era Rome and Greece, which was thought to be commonly practiced by augurs in both empires.

The original grove from which the Romans took their laurel branches withered in 68 AD, a fact which contemporary augurs associated with Nero's death.
