= Orsinome (mythology) =

Greek mythological figure

In Greek mythology, Orsinome (Ancient Greek: Ὀρσινόμην) was the daughter of Eurynomus, son of Magnes and Phylodice. She married Lapithes, son of Apollo and Stilbe, by whom she became the mother of Phorbas, Periphas, Triopas and Diomede.
