= Eteoneus =

In Greek mythology, Eteoneus (Ancient Greek: Ἐτεωνεύς) may refer to various characters:

- Eteoneus, the Lacedaemonian son of Boethous, son of the Pelopid Argeius. During the Trojan War, he was the weapon-carrier of King Menelaus of Sparta. Afterwards, Eteoneus helped Odysseus in his trials getting back home.
- Eteoneus, one of the Suitors of Penelope who came from Same along with other 22 wooers. He, with the other suitors, was shot dead by Odysseus with the assistance of Eumaeus, Philoetius, and Telemachus.

== See also ==
- 12916 Eteoneus, Jovian asteroid
- List of mortals in Greek mythology
