= Pierus of Magnesia =

In Greek mythology, Pierus (Ancient Greek: Πίερος, Píeros) was the son of Thessalian Magnes. He was the lover of muse Clio and father of Hyacinth in some accounts, and Rhagus.

== Mythology ==
Pierus was loved by muse Clio because Aphrodite had inspired her with the passion, as a punishment for deriding the goddess' own love for Adonis. This was the only myth where Pierus appeared once:

"Clio fell in love with Pierus, son of Magnes, in consequence of the wrath of Aphrodite, whom she had twitted with her love of Adonis; and having met him she bore him a son, Hyacinth..."
