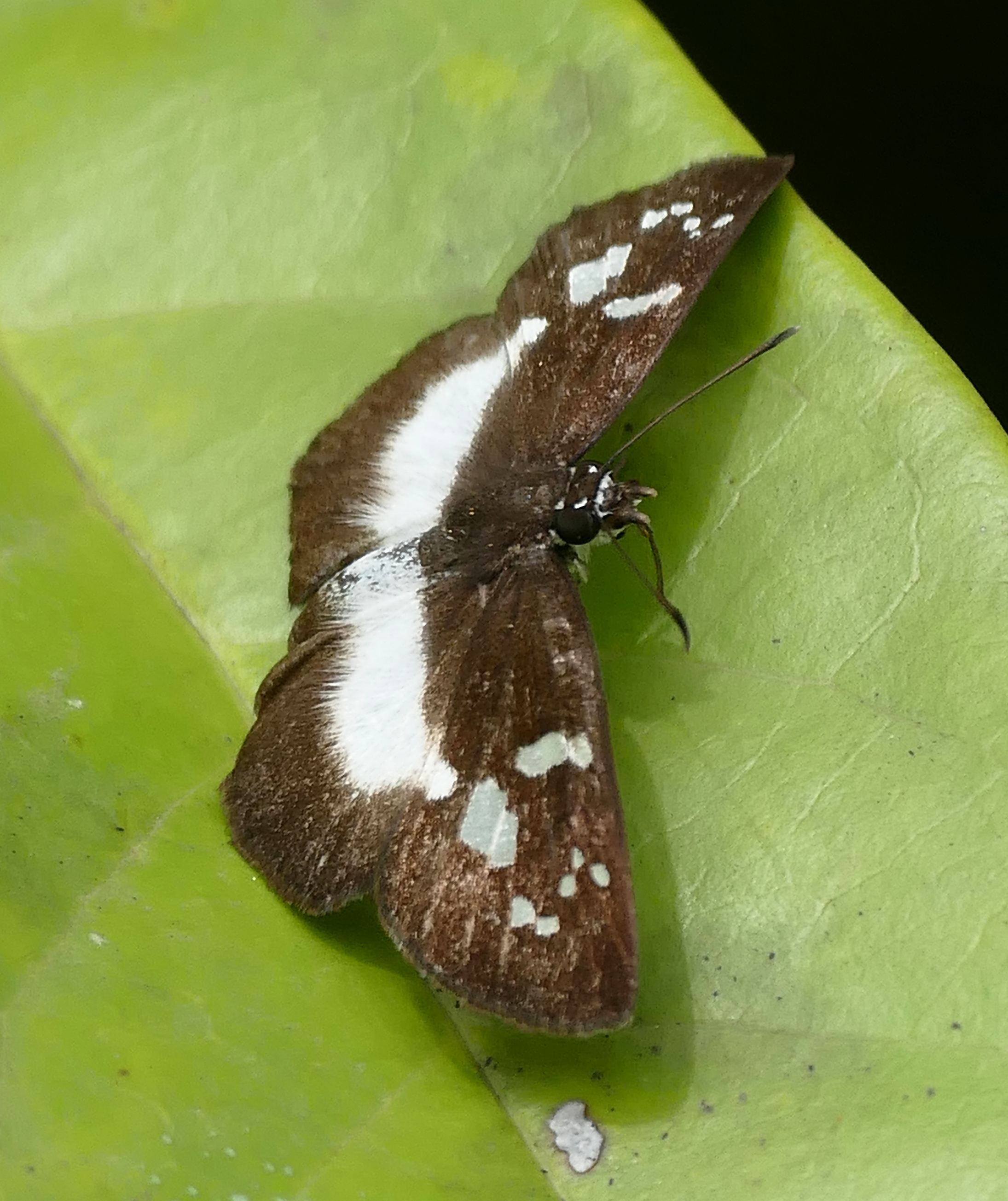
- Milanion hemes

Scientific classification
- Kingdom: Animalia
- Phylum: Arthropoda
- Class: Insecta
- Order: Lepidoptera
- Family: Hesperiidae
- Subfamily: Pyrginae
- Genus: Milanion; Godman & Salvin, 1895

Type species
- Milanion hemes (Cramer, 1777)

= Milanion =

Genus of butterflies

Milanion is a genus of butterflies in the family Hesperiidae.

== See also ==
- Melanion (mythology)
