= Hegesander =

Hegesander (Ancient Greek: ῾Ηγήσανδρος, romanized: Hegedsandros) may refer to:

- Hegesander (historian), 2nd century BC Greek writer, and a citizen of Delphi
- Agesander of Rhodes, also called Hegesander, 1st century BC Greek sculptor or several sculptors from the island of Rhodes

== See also ==
- Hegesandridas
- Hegesandra
