= Aenetus (mythology) =

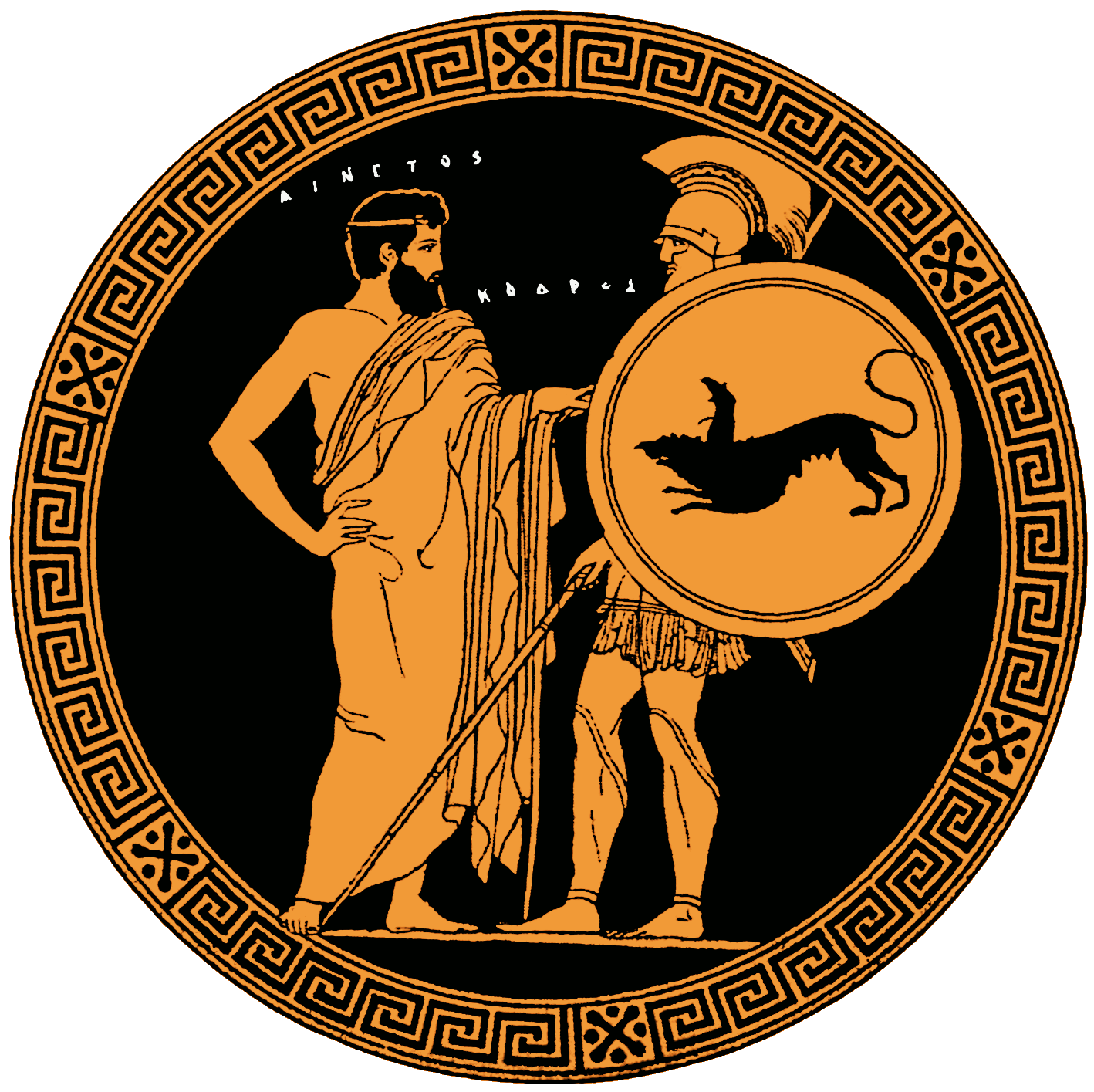
Cody’s, the last king of Athens, on a Attic red-figure cup of Bologna

In Greek mythology, Aenetus (Ancient Greek: Αἰνετὸς, lit. 'praiseworthy') was a Phocian prince as the son of King Deioneus and Diomede, daughter of Xuthus. He was the brother of Cephalus, Actor, Phylacus and Asterodia.
