= Amyclas =

Set of mythological Greek characters

In Greek mythology, Amyclas (Ancient Greek: Ἀμύκλας, romanized: Amýklas) refers to two individuals:

- Amyclas, a mythical king of Sparta.
- Amyclas, a Theban prince and the son of King Amphion and Niobe, daughter of Tantalus. He perished with his brothers and sisters in the massacre of Niobids. In other versions, however, he was presented as the only surviving male (with his sister Chloris). When Laius the rightful king of Thebes returned, he was exiled, fleeing to Sparta, where some say he founded Amyclae.

There is also an Amyclas in Roman epic:

- In Lucan's Pharsalia (Book V), Caesar knocks on the door of a poor fisherman named Amyclas as he looks to cross the Adriatic. Dante mentions this scene in Paradiso, Canto XI.68.
