= Phylarchus =

3rd-century BC Greek historian

Phylarchus (Greek: Φύλαρχoς, Phylarkhos; fl. 3rd century BC) was a Greek historical writer whose works have been lost, but not before having been considerably used by other historians whose works have survived.

== Life ==
Phylarchus was a contemporary of Aratus, in the 3rd century BC. His birthplace is doubtful. In the Suda it is stated that three different cities are mentioned as his native place: Athens, Naucratis in Egypt, or Sicyon; Athenaeus calls him an Athenian or Naucratian. Respecting the date of Phylarchus there is less uncertainty. Polybius writes that Phylarchus was a contemporary of Aratus, and gave an account of the same events as the latter did in his history. Aratus died 213 BC, and his work ended at 220 BC, therefore placing Phylarchus at about 215 BC.

== His influence ==
The credit of Phylarchus as an historian is vehemently attacked by Polybius, who charges him with falsifying history through his partiality to Cleomenes III, king of Sparta, and his hatred against Aratus and the Achaeans. The accusation of Polybius is repeated by Plutarch, but it comes with rather a bad grace from the latter writer, since there can be little doubt that his lives of Agis and Cleomenes are taken almost entirely from Phylarchus, to whom he is likewise indebted for the latter part of his life of Pyrrhus. The vivid and graphic style of Phylarchus was well suited to Plutarch's purpose. It has likewise been remarked that Pompeius Trogus took from Phylarchus that portion of his work which treated of the same times as were contained in the history of Phylarchus. That Plutarch and Trogus borrowed almost the very words of Phylarchus, appears from a comparison of Justin, xxviii. 4, with Plutarch's Cleomenenes, 29.

== His style ==
The style of Phylarchus is strongly censured by Polybius, who blames him for writing history for the purpose of effect, and for seeking to harrow up the feelings of his readers by the narrative of deeds of violence and horror. This charge is to some extent supported by the fragments of his work; but whether he deserves all the reprehension which Polybius has bestowed upon him may well be questioned, since the unpoetical character of this great historian's mind would not enable him to feel much sympathy with a writer like Phylarchus, who seems to have possessed no small share of imagination and fancy. It would appear that the style of Phylarchus was too ambitious; it was oratorical, and perhaps declamatory; but at the same time it was lively and attractive, and brought the events of the history vividly before the reader's mind. He was, however, very negligent in the arrangement of his words, as Dionysius has remarked.

== His known works ==
The following six works are attributed to Phylarchus by the Suda: —

- Histories (Iστoριαι), in 28 books, which were by far the most important of his writings. This work is thus described by the Suda: — "The expedition of Pyrrhus of Epirus against the Peloponnese in 28 books; and it comes down to Ptolemy who was called Euergetes, and to the end of Berenice, and as far as Cleomenes the Spartan, against whom Antigonus made war." When the Suda entitles it "the expedition of Pyrrhus, &c." he merely describes the first event in the work. The expedition of Pyrrhus into the Peloponnese was in 272 BC; the death of Cleomenes in 220 BC: the work therefore embraced a period of fifty-two years. From some of the fragments of the work which have been preserved, it has been conjectured by some writers that Phylarchus commenced at an earlier period, perhaps as early as the death of Alexander the Great. The work gave the history not only of Greece and Macedonia, but likewise of Aegypt, Cyrene, and the other states of the time; and in narrating the history of Greece, Phylarchus paid particular attention to that of Cleomenes and the Spartans.
- The story of Antiochus and Eumenes of Pergamum (Tα κατα τoν Aντιoχoν και τoν Περγαμηνoν Eυμενη), was probably a portion of the preceding work, since the war between the Attalid Eumenes I and the Seleucid Antiochus I Soter was hardly of sufficient importance to give rise to a separate history, and that between Eumenes II and Antiochus III the Great was subsequent to the time of Phylarchus.
- Epitome of myth on the apparition of Zeus, was one work, although cited by the Suda as two: the general title was Epitome mythike, and that of the first part Peri tes tou Dios epiphaneias.
- On discoveries, on which subject Ephorus and Philochorus also wrote.
- Digressions.
- Agrapha, not mentioned by the Suda, and only by the Scholiast on Aelius Aristides, was probably a work on the more abstruse points of mythology, of which no written account had ever been given.
