= Harpalus (mythology) =

Son of Amyclas in Greek mythology

Harpalus (Ancient Greek: Ἁρπάλου), in Greek mythology, was a Spartan prince as the son of King Amyclas of Laconia, and possibly Diomede, daughter of Lapithes. Harpalus was the father of Deritus, ancestor of Patreus, founder of Patras.
