= Daphne =

Figure in Greek mythology

- The Laurel Nymph
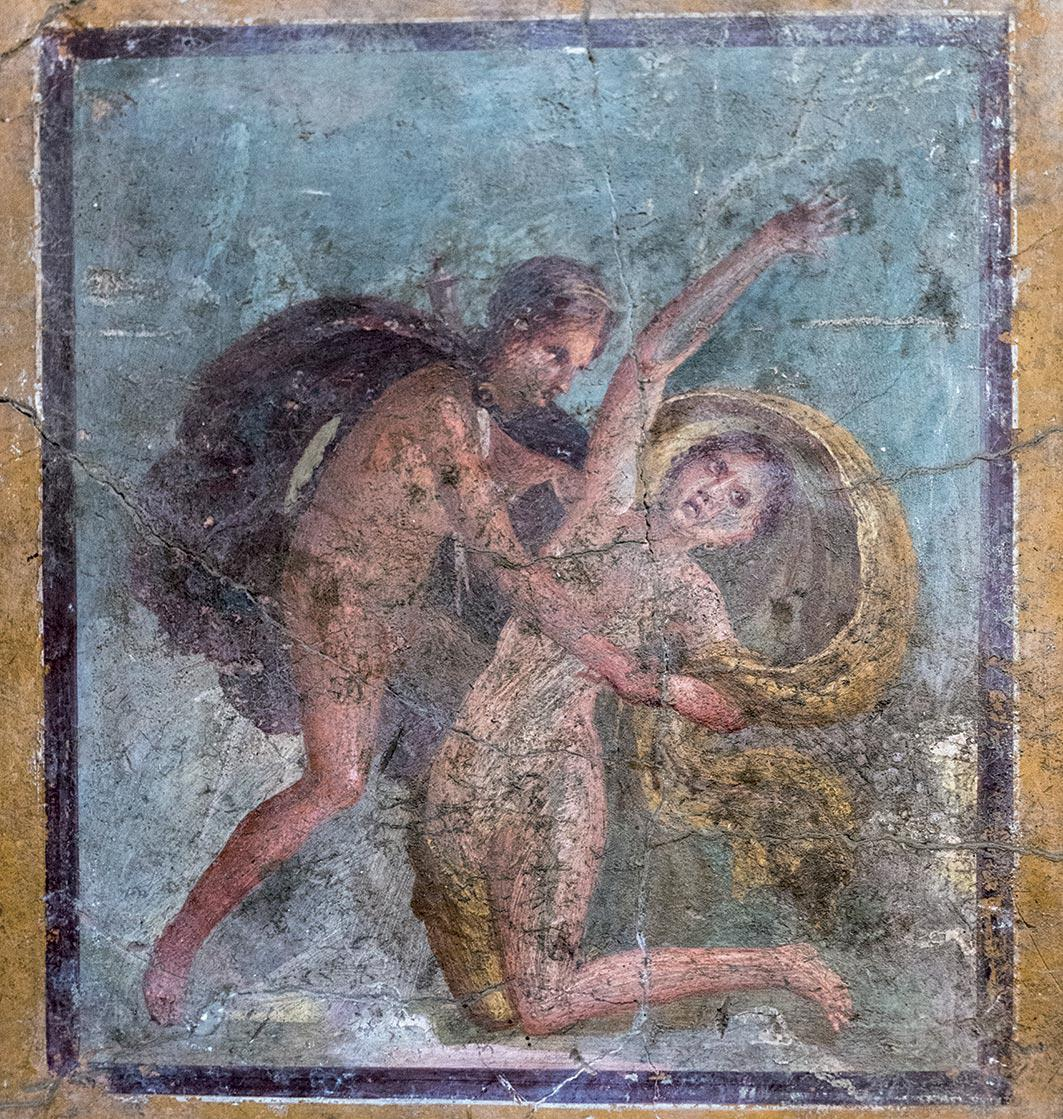
- Antique fresco of Apollo and Daphne from Pompeii, 1st century
- Abode: Thessaly or Arcadia or Laconia

Genealogy
- Parents: (1) Peneus and Creusa (2) Ladon and Gaia (3) Ladon and Stymphalis (4) Amyclas
- Siblings: (1) Menippe, Stilbe and Hypseus (2, 3) Metope

Daphne (/ˈdæfni/; DAFF-nee; Ancient Greek: Δάφνη, Dáphnē, lit. 'laurel'), a figure in Greek mythology, was in various retellings a mortal woman or a nymph, daughter of a river god. The god Apollo fell in love with Daphne and chased her against her wishes, but before he caught her, Daphne prayed for escape, and was transformed into a laurel tree. Thenceforth Apollo developed a special reverence for laurel.

At the Pythian Games, which were held every four years in Delphi in honour of Apollo, a wreath of laurel gathered from the Vale of Tempe in Thessaly was given as a prize. Hence it later became customary to award prizes in the form of laurel wreaths to victorious generals, athletes, poets and musicians, worn as a chaplet on the head. The Poet Laureate is a well-known modern example of such a prize-winner, dating from the early Renaissance in Italy. According to Pausanias the reason for this was "simply and solely because the prevailing tradition has it that Apollo fell in love with the daughter of Ladon" (Daphne). Most artistic depictions of the myth focus on the moment of Daphne's transformation.

== Family ==
Sources variously claim Daphne to have been a daughter of the (1) Thessalian river god Peneus by the nymph Creusa, or of (2) another Arcadian river-deity Ladon (Orontes) by Ge (Earth) or lastly, King Amyclas of Amyclae.

== Mythology ==
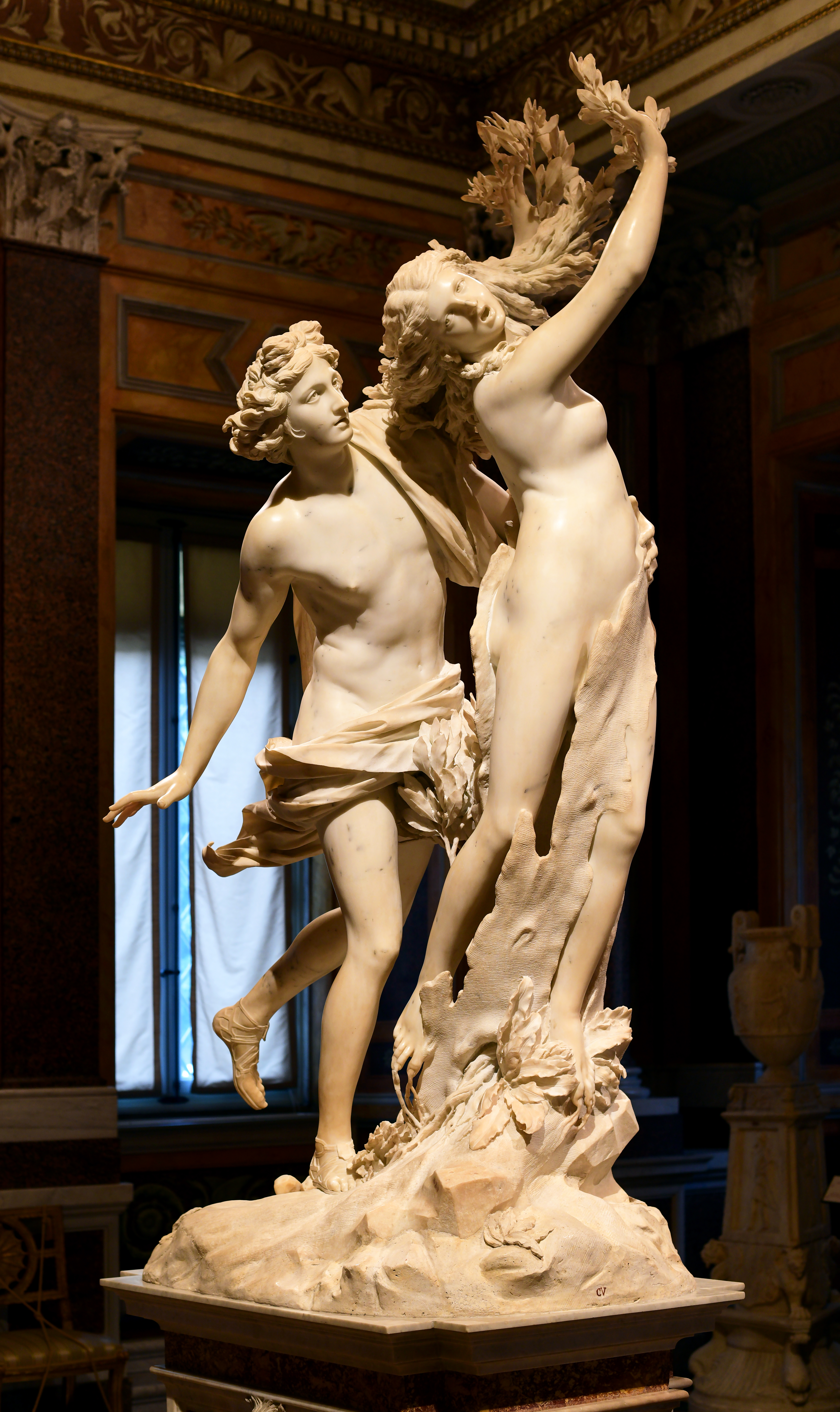
Apollo and Daphne, a 1625 sculpture by Bernini, inspired by Ovid's Metamorphoses, depicting the initial stage of Daphne's transformation

The earliest source of the myth of Daphne and Apollo is Phylarchus, quoted by Parthenius of Nicaea. Later, the Roman poet Ovid does a retelling of this Greek legend, which appears in his work Metamorphoses.

=== Ovid ===
The pursuit of a local nymph by an Olympian god, part of the archaic adjustment of religious cult in Greece, was given an arch anecdotal turn in the Metamorphoses by the Roman poet Ovid (died AD 17). According to this version Apollo's infatuation was caused by a golden-tipped arrow shot at him by Cupid, son of Venus, who wanted to punish Apollo for having insulted his archery skills by commenting "What hast thou to do with the arms of men, thou wanton boy?", and to demonstrate the power of love's arrow. Eros also shot Daphne, but with a leaden-tipped arrow, the effect of which was to make her flee from Apollo.

Elated with sudden love, Apollo chased Daphne continually. He tried to make her cease her flight by saying he did not wish to hurt her. When she kept fleeing, Apollo lamented that even though he had the knowledge of medicinal herbs, he had failed to cure himself from the wound of Cupid's arrow. When Apollo finally caught up with her, Daphne prayed for help to her father, the river god Peneus of Thessaly, who immediately commenced her transformation into a laurel tree (Laurus nobilis):

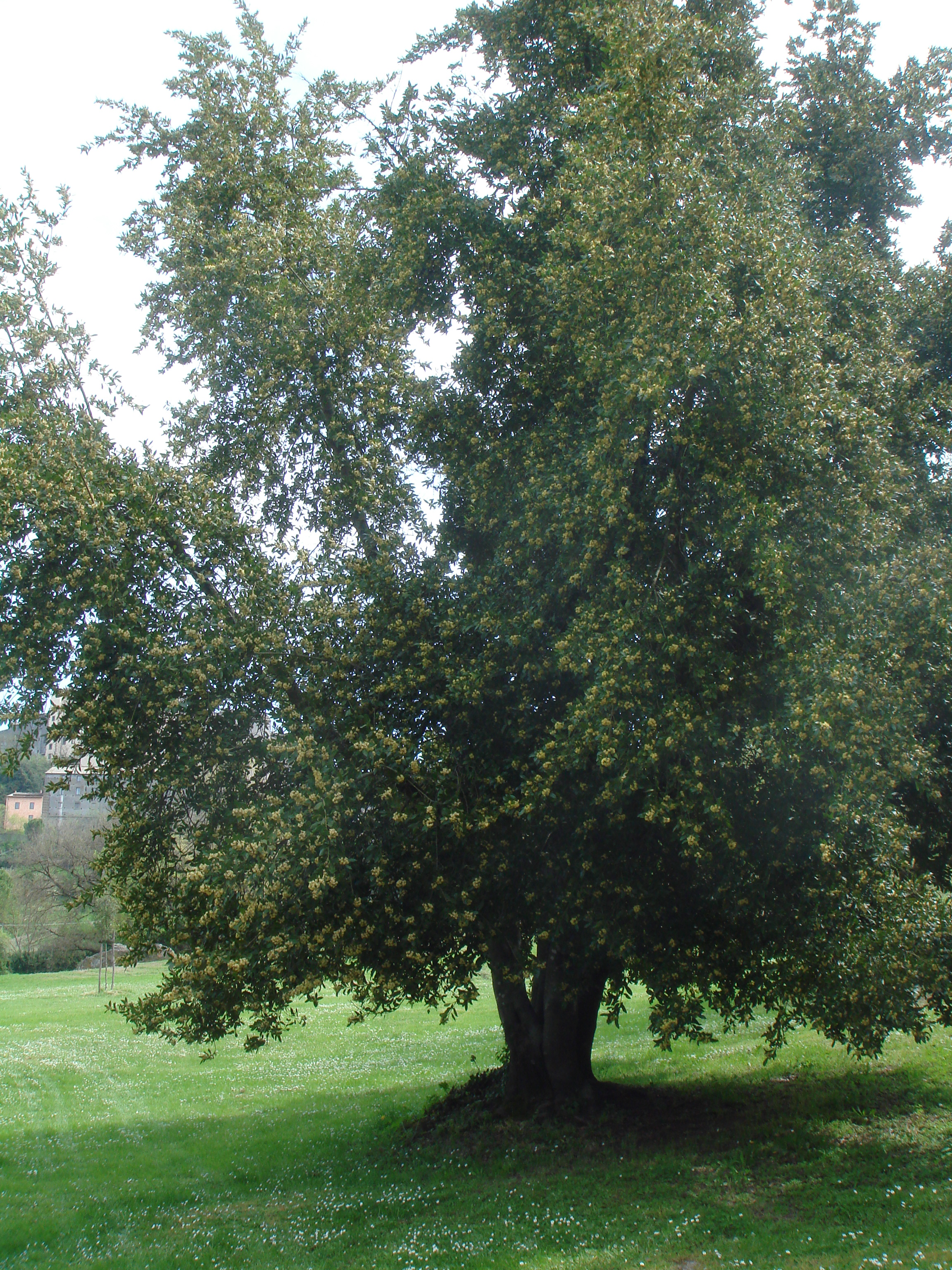
A laurel tree

a heavy numbness seized her limbs, thin bark closed over her breast, her hair turned into leaves, her arms into branches, her feet so swift a moment ago stuck fast in slow-growing roots, her face was lost in the canopy. Only her shining beauty was left.

Even this did not quench Apollo's ardour, and as he embraced the tree, he felt her heart still beating. He then declared:

"My bride," he said, "since you can never be, at least, sweet laurel, you shall be my tree. My lure, my locks, my quiver you shall wreathe."

Upon hearing his words, Daphne bends her branches, unable to stop it.

=== Parthenius ===
A version of the attempt on Daphne's sworn virginity that has been less familiar since the Renaissance was narrated by the Hellenistic poet Parthenius, in his Erotica Pathemata, "The Sorrows of Love", which he attributes to Hellenistic historian Phylarchus. In this, which is the earliest written account, Daphne is a mortal girl, daughter of Amyclas, fond of hunting and determined to remain a virgin; she is pursued by the boy Leucippus ("white stallion"), who disguises himself in a girl's outfit in order to join her band of huntresses. He is also successful in gaining her innocent affection. This makes Apollo angry and he puts it into the girl's mind to stop to bathe in the river Ladon; there, as all strip naked, the ruse is revealed, as in the myth of Callisto, and the affronted huntresses plunge their spears into Leucippus. At this moment Apollo's attention becomes engaged, and he begins his own pursuit. Daphne, fleeing to escape Apollo's advances, prays to Zeus to help. Zeus turns her into laurel tree. Parthenius' modern editor remarks on the rather awkward transition, linking two narratives.

=== Pausanias ===
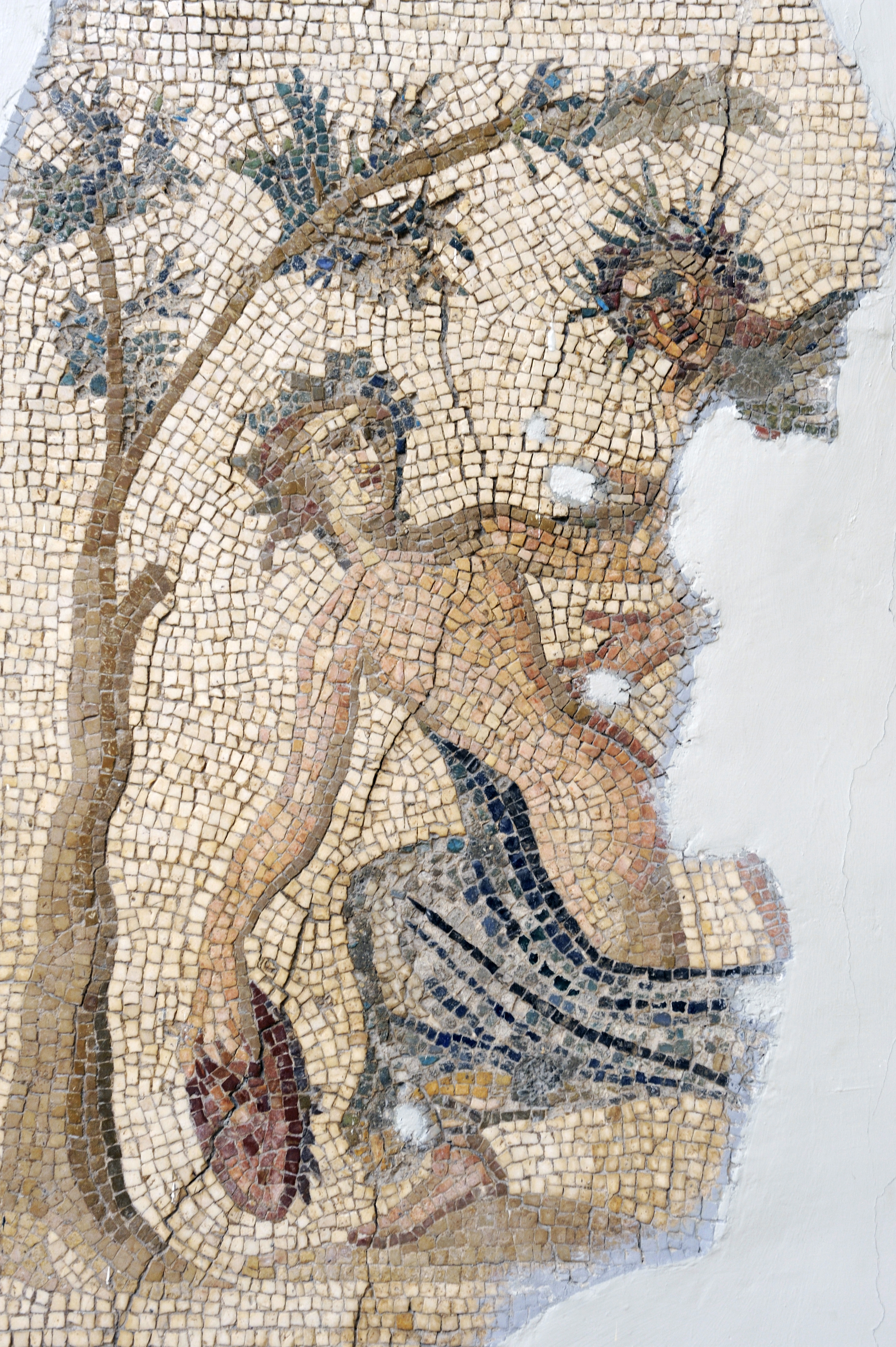
Apollo (already wearing a laurel wreath) and Daphne, Antakya Archaeological Museum

Parthenius' tale was known to Pausanias, who recounted it in his Description of Greece (2nd century AD). According to him, Leucippus was a son of the prince of Pisa, whose attempts to woo her by open courtship all failed, as Daphne avoided all males. Leucippus then thought of the following trick; he grew his hair and wore women's clothes, and this way managed to get close to Daphne, to whom he introduced himself as a daughter of the prince. As he was the highest-ranking and best huntsman of Daphne's company, he became good friends with her. Apollo, himself in love with Daphne too, was jealous of Leucippus' success in love, however Leucippus' ruse was soon discovered when the girls took a bath in a lake; they stripped a reluctant Leucippus naked, and upon discovering his true sex, killed him with javelins and daggers.

=== Hyginus ===
When Apollo pursued the virgin Daphne, who in Hyginus' version is a daughter of the river god Peneus, it was the earth goddess Gaia to whom she begged for protection. Gaia then received her, changing her into a laurel tree, while Apollo created a wreath with one of its branches.

=== Other authors ===
Philostratus in his Life of Apollonius of Tyana says the Assyrians, who worshipped Apollo Daphnaeus ("Apollo of the Laurel") place the site of Daphne's transformation from Arcadia to Antioch (modern day Antakya in Turkey).

Nonnus also placed Daphne's dwellings near the Orontes River, and says that it was Gaia who swallowed up the girl before she knew marriage; Apollo always blamed Gaia for this.

In his Dialogues of the Gods, satirical author Lucian of Samosata has Apollo call Daphne and Hyacinthus his two greatest loves, and regret losing them both; he declares himself unlucky in love, especially since Daphne found the option of becoming a tree more attractive than him. Eros also mentions to Zeus Daphne not falling for Apollo.

A sixth century AD poet, Dioscorus of Aphrodito, composed a poem where Apollo calls Daphne and Hyacinthus his two greatest loves, and mourns their loss.

== Laurel varieties ==
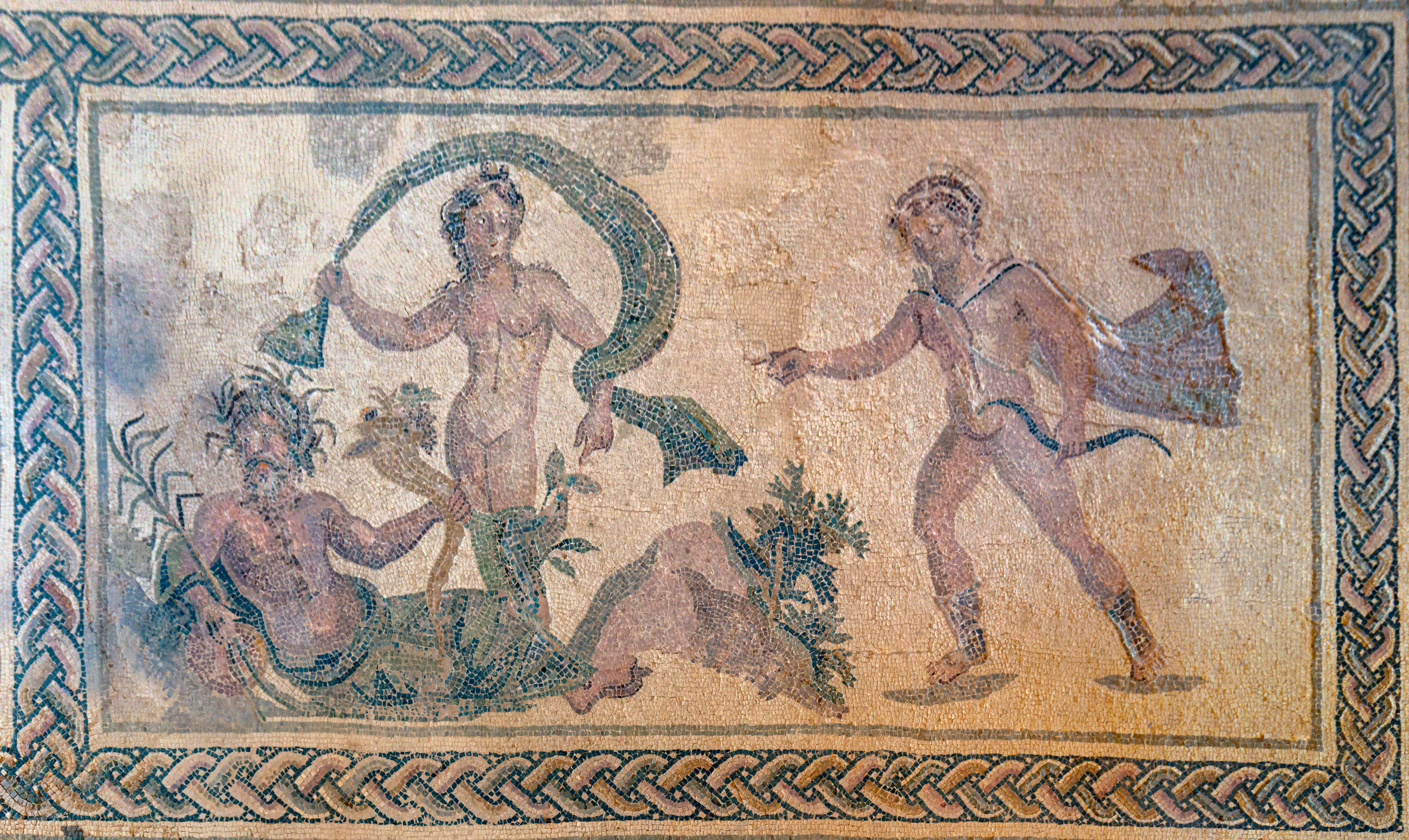
Apollo and Daphne mosaic in the House of Dionysius in Nea Paphos, Cyprus.

The name Daphne, in Greek Δάφνη, means "laurel".

While the story of Daphne is traditionally connected with the bay laurel (Laurus nobilis), Carl Linnaeus named a different genus of nearly 90 species of evergreen shrubs, some of whose leaves have a similar appearance to laurel leaves, Daphne. These plants are noted for their scented flowers and poisonous berries, and include the garland flower (Daphne cneorum); the February Daphne or mezereon (Daphne mezereum); and the spurge-laurel or wood-laurel (Daphne laureola). These species are in the family Thymelaeaceae and are native to Asia, Europe and North Africa.

== Temples ==
=== Artemis Daphnaia ===
Artemis Daphnaia, who had her temple among the Lacedemonians, at a place called Hypsoi in antiquity, on the slopes of Mount Cnacadion near the Spartan frontier, had her own sacred laurel trees.

=== Apollo Daphnephoros, Eretria ===
At Eretria the identity of an excavated 7th- and 6th-century BCE temple to Apollo Daphnephoros, "Apollo, laurel-bearer", or "carrying off Daphne", a "place where the citizens are to take the oath", is identified in inscriptions.

== Cultural depictions ==
A plasterwork depiction of Apollo and Daphne, English, second half of 16th century. Daphne's fingers are shown as leaves, whilst Apollo is identifiable by his quiver of arrows slung over his shoulder

- Dafne (1598), opera by Jacopo Peri and Jacopo Corsi to a libretto by Ottavio Rinuccini
- La Dafne (1608), opera by Marco da Gagliano to a libretto Ottavio Rinuccini
- A famous rendition of the subject is Gian Lorenzo Bernini's 1622-1625 sculpture Apollo and Daphne.
- Die Dafne (1627), lost opera by Heinrich Schütz to a libretto by Martin Opitz, a translation of Rinuccini's libretto
- Daphne (1938), opera by Richard Strauss about the legend based on accounts by both Ovid and Euripides
- In the WEBTOON comic Lore Olympus, Daphne is a fashion model, yoga instructor, and social media influencer who's dating Thanatos, the god of death.

== Gallery ==
Daphne's transformation in art

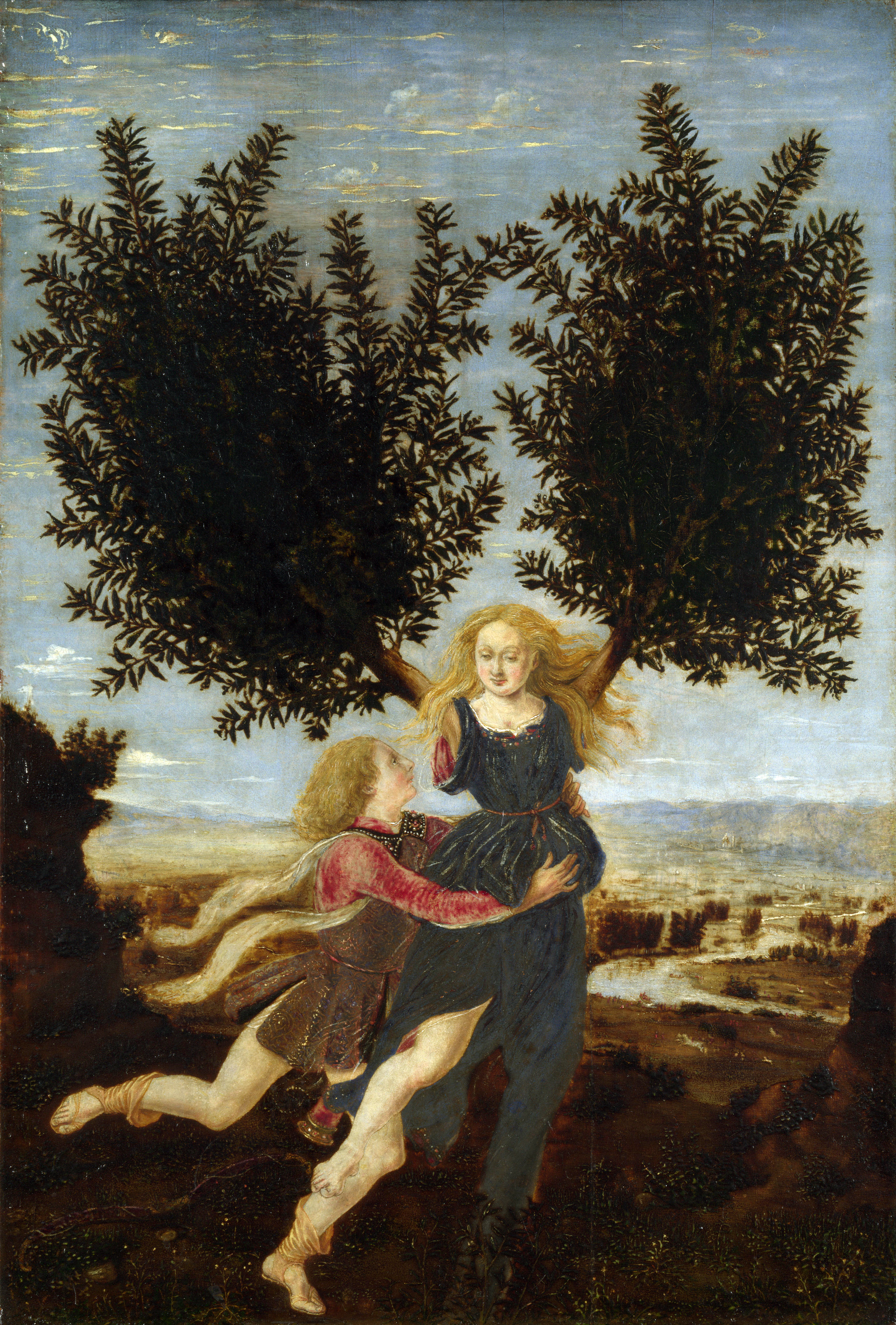
Apollo and Daphne
by Pollaiuolo, c. 1470–1480 (National Gallery, London)

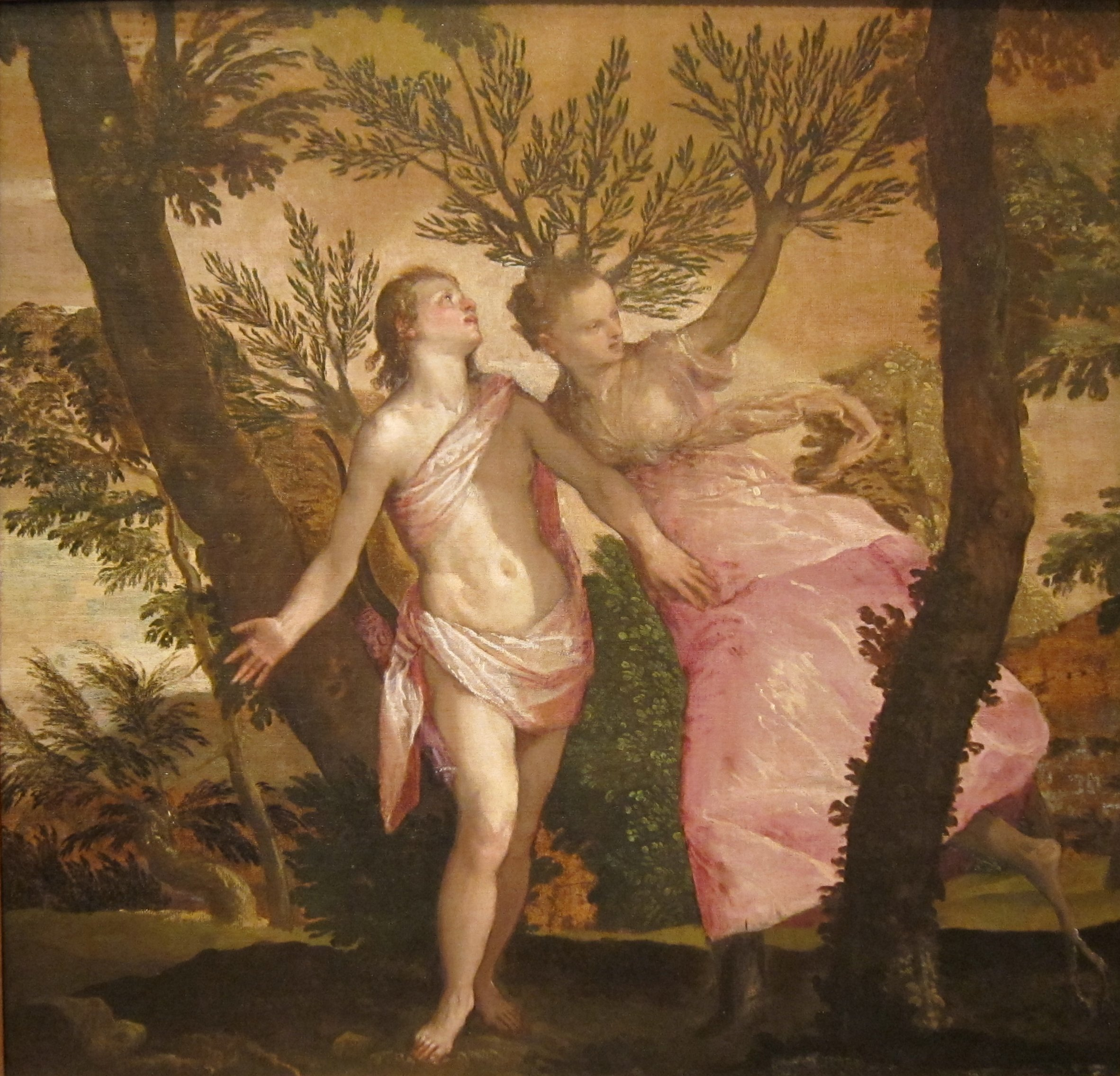
Apollo and Daphne
by Veronese, c. 1560–1565 (San Diego Museum of Art)

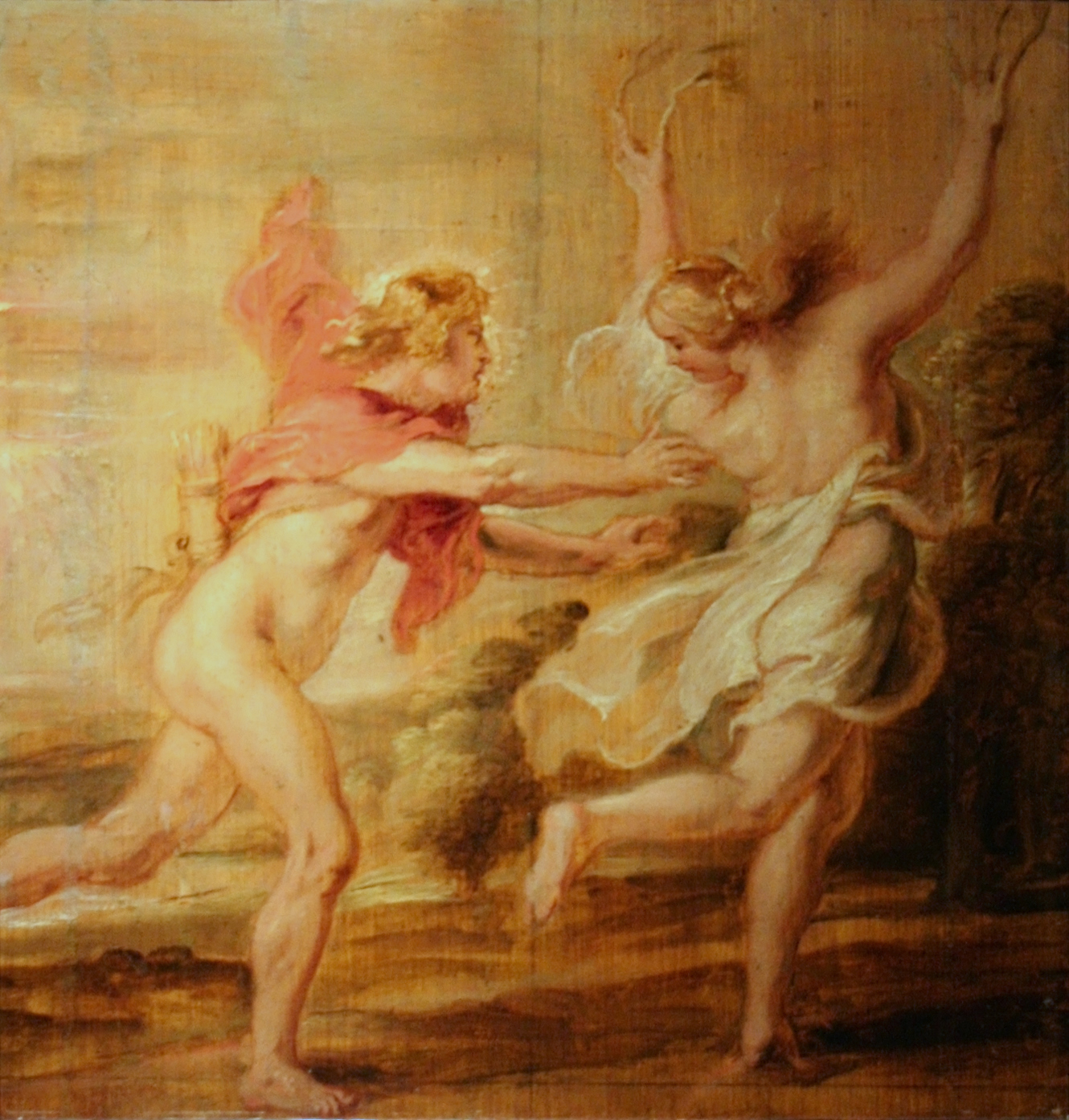
Apollon et Daphné
by Rubens, c. 1636 (Musée Bonnat, Bayonne)

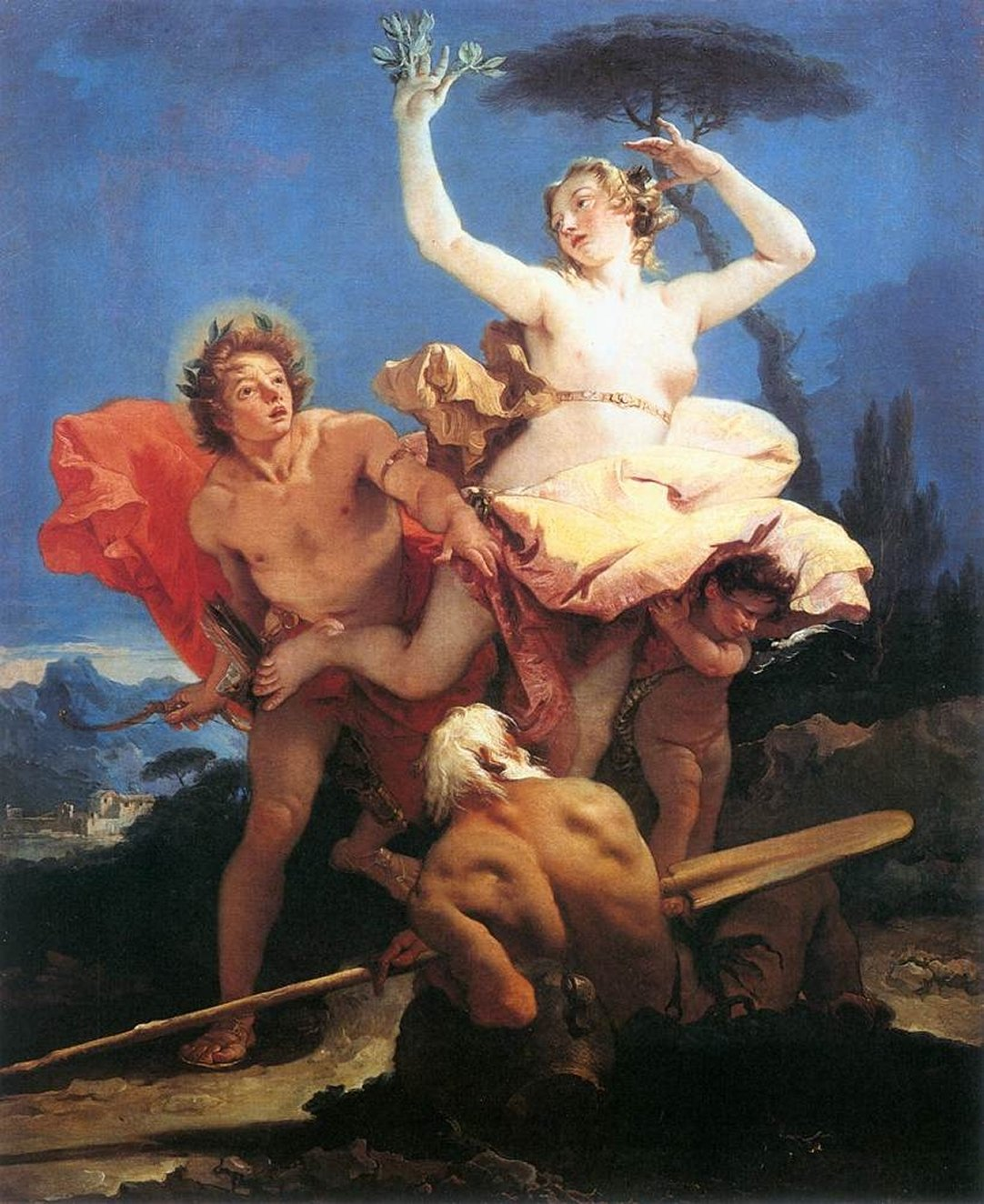
Apollo and Daphne
by Tiepolo, c. 1744–45 (Louvre)

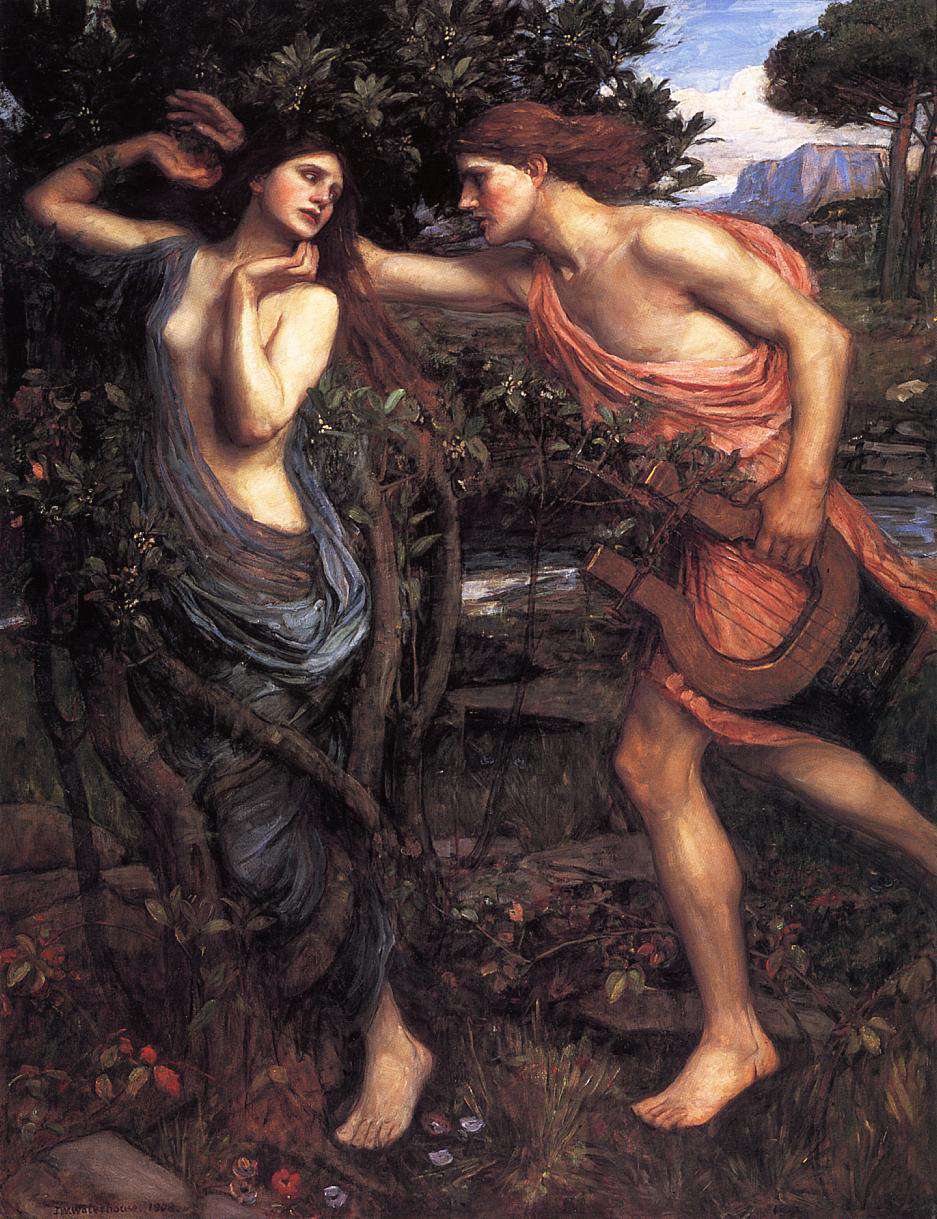
Apollo and Daphne
by Waterhouse, 1908

== See also ==
Other women pursued by gods:

- Syrinx
- Pitys
- Bolina
- Arethusa
- Corone
- Ocyrhoë
