= Polyboea =

In Greek mythology, Polyboea or Polyboia (/ˌpɒlɪˈbiːə/; Ancient Greek: Πολύβοια, romanized: Polúboia, lit. 'much cattle', pronounced [polýboi̯a]), is a name that refers to:

- Polyboea, possibly the accurate name for Polybe, one of the Danaides as daughter of Danaus. She married her paternal cousin Iltonomus, son of Aegyptus, whom she eventually killed on their wedding night following the instructions of her father.
- Polyboea, a sister of Hyacinthus who died a virgin and was believed to have been taken to Elysium by Aphrodite, Athena and Artemis, together with her brother.
- Polyboea, the first wife of Actor who wedded afterwards the heroine Aegina.
- Polyboea, daughter of Oecles and Hypermnestra, sister of Iphianeira and Amphiaraus.
- Polyboea, a handmaid of Hecuba, who found the dead body of Polydorus.
- Polyboea, an alternate name for Philonome, wife of Cycnus and stepmother of Tenes.
- Polyboea, an obscure theonym, likely an epithet of Artemis or Persephone.
