= Lapithes (mythology) =

Greek mythological figures

In Greek mythology, Lapithes (/læpiːθs/);(Ancient Greek: Λαπίθης) may refer to the following figures:

- Lapithes, son of Apollo and Stilbe. He and his full brother Centaurus were believed to have given their names to the legendary races of Lapiths and Centaurs respectively. Lapithes settled on the banks of River Peneus and married Orsinome, daughter of Eurynomus, by whom he became the father of Phorbas, Periphas, Triopas (possibly) and Diomede.
- Lapithes, son of Aeolus (son of Hippotes) and father of Lesbus, who married Methymna, daughter of Macareus, and gave his name to the island of Lesbos.
