= Hegesandra =

Spartan princess in Greek mythology

In Greek mythology, Hegesandra or Hegesandre (Ancient Greek: Ήγησάνδρα or Ήγησάνδρη, romanized: Hēgēsándra, lit. 'leader of men' or 'she who guides men') was a Spartan princess as the daughter of King Amyclas. Hegesandra married Argeius, son of King Pelops of Pisa. The couple had three sons: Melanion, Alector and Boethoos.

== See also ==
- Hegesander
