= Amyclas of Sparta =

Greek mythological character

In Greek mythology, Amyclas (Ancient Greek: Ἀμύκλας, romanized: Amýklas) or Amyclus was a king of Sparta and the son of Lacedaemon. The town of Amyclae in Laconia was said to have been founded by and named after him.

== Genealogy ==
Amyclas was the son of King Lacedemon and Queen Sparta, and brother of Queen Eurydice of Argos. He was the father of Argalus, Cynortas, Hyacinth, Laodamia (or Leaneira), Harpalus, and Hegesandre. In other versions of the myth, Amyclas was also called the father of Daphne. Cynortas was the son who succeeded Amyclas on the throne; in some versions Cynortas ascends to power directly after his father, and in others he does so after Argalus, his elder brother, dies.

Regnal titles
Preceded by Lacedaemon	King of Sparta	Succeeded by Argalus
