= Hesione (mythology) =

In Greek mythology, the name Hesione (/hɪˈsaɪ.əniː/; Ancient Greek: Ἡσιονη) refers to various mythological figures:

- Hesione, a daughter of Oceanus and the wife of Prometheus.
- Hesione, also called Isonoe, one of the Danaids. She became the mother of Orchomenus or Chryses, either by Zeus or by Eteocles.
- Hesione, a Trojan princess and daughter of Laomedon.
- Hesione, one of the names given to the wife of Nauplius, who was the father of Palamedes, Oiax and Nausimedon. The mythographer Apollodorus reports that, according to Cercops Nauplius' wife was Hesione, and that in the Nostoi (Returns), an early epic from the Trojan cycle of poems about the Trojan War, his wife was Philyra, but that according to the "tragic poets" his wife was Clymene.
- Hesione, daughter of Celeus, was one of the sacrificial victims of Minotaur. She may be the sister of another victim, Porphyrion granting that their father named Celeus is the same.

== Other ==
- Wonder Woman (comic book) 1976 Volume 1: Issues 226 & 227 - A golden robot formerly owned by Hephaestus, The God of Fire
