= Philyra (mythology) =

Multiple Greek mythological figures

Philyra or Phillyra (Ancient Greek: Φιλύρα, romanized: Philýra, lit. 'linden-tree'; pronounced /ˈfɪlərə/ or /fɪˈlaɪrə/, fih-LYE-rah or FIL-uh-ruh; or /fɪˈliːrə/, fee-LEE-rah) is the name of three distinct characters in Greek mythology.

- Philyra, an Oceanid and mother of Chiron by Cronus.
- Philyra, one of the names given to the wife of Nauplius, who was the father of Palamedes, Oiax and Nausimedon. The mythographer Apollodorus reports that, in the Nostoi (Returns), an early epic from the Trojan cycle of poems about the Trojan War, Nauplius' wife was Philyra, and that according to Cercops his wife was Hesione, but that according to the "tragic poets" his wife was Clymene.
- Philyra or Phillyra, daughter of the river god Asopus, and the mother of Hypseus by Peneius. Otherwise, the mother of the Lapith king was called Naïs or Creusa instead.
