= Andromache (mythology) =

In Greek mythology, Andromache (/ænˈdrɒməkiː/; Ancient Greek: Ἀνδρομάχη, romanized: Andromákhē [andromákʰɛ:], lit. 'fighter of men', 'man-battler' or 'battle of a man') may refer to the following women:

- Andromache, the noble wife of Hector.
- Andromache, one of the Amazons who was depicted in an amphora fighting and being defeated by Heracles together with two other Amazons — Alkaia and unnamed one. She was shown as endeavouring to retreat to her right and looks back at the hero; Heracles left hand is about to grasp her shoulder and about to strike her. Andromache was portrayed to have long tresses, high-crested helmet with cheek-pieces, short-sleeved chiton, spear in her right hand and strapped to her left arm is a Boeotian shield engraved with four pellets and a boss in the shape of a rosette. In one account, she was mentioned as an Amazonian queen.
- Andromache, one of the would-be sacrificial victims of Minotaur. She was the daughter of Eurymedon.
