= Nauplius (mythology) =

Set of mythological Greek characters

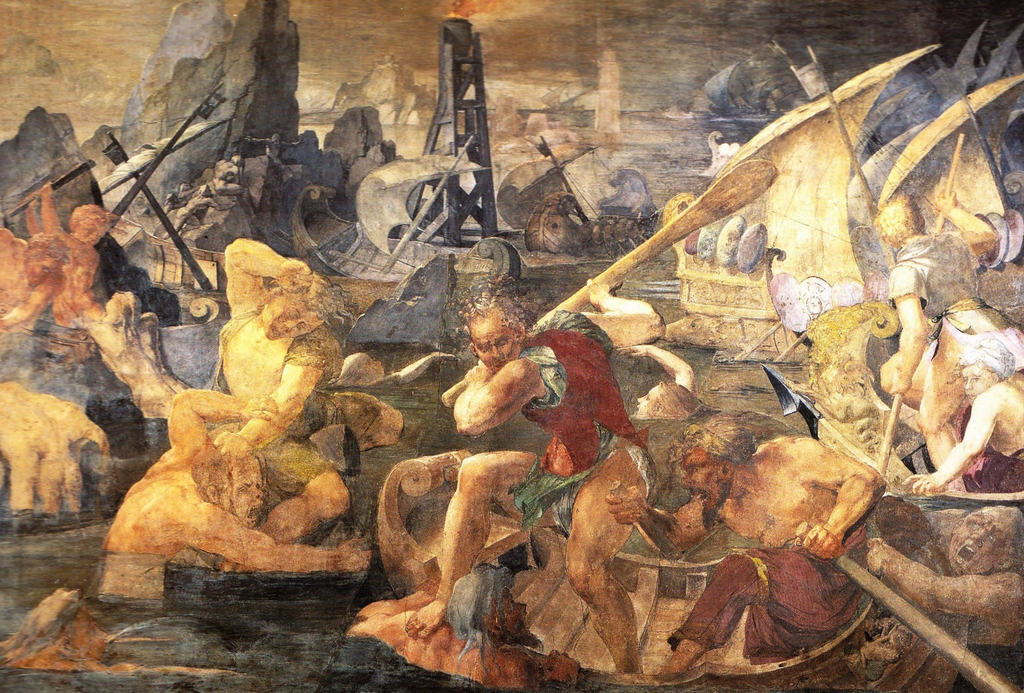
Revenge of Nauplius (1530s), fresco from the Gallery of Francis I, Palace of Fontainebleau

In Greek mythology, Nauplius (Ancient Greek: Ναύπλιος, romanized: Naúplios, lit. 'seafarer'; pronounced /ˈnɔːpliəs/, /ˈnɑː-/ or /nɔː.plɪ.əs/, NAW-plee-uhs) is the name of one (or more) mariner heroes. Whether these should be considered to be the same person, or two or possibly three distinct persons, is not entirely clear. The most famous Nauplius, was the father of Palamedes, called Nauplius the Wrecker, because he caused the Greek fleet, sailing home from the Trojan War, to shipwreck, in revenge for the unjust killing of Palamedes. This Nauplius was also involved in the stories of Aerope, the mother of Agamemnon and Menelaus, and Auge, the mother of Telephus. The mythographer Apollodorus says he was the same as the Nauplius who was the son of Poseidon and Amymone. Nauplius was also the name of one of the Argonauts, and although Apollonius of Rhodes made the Argonaut a direct descendant of the son of Poseidon, the Roman mythographer Hyginus makes them the same person. However, no surviving ancient source identifies the Argonaut with the father of Palamedes.

== Son of Poseidon ==
The sea god Poseidon fathered a son, Nauplius, by Amymone, daughter of Danaus. This Nauplius was reputed to have been the eponymous founder of Nauplia (modern Nafplion) in Argolis, and a famous navigator who discovered the constellation Ursa Major (Great Bear). Apollonius of Rhodes says that he was the ancestor of an Argonaut with the same name, via the lineage: Nauplius – Proetus – Lernus – Naubolus – Clytoneus – Nauplius. According to Pherecydes of Athens, he was the father of Damastor, and through him, the grandfather of Peristhenes, and the great-grandfather of Dictys and Polydectes. He was renowned as an expert seafarer, and possibly the inventor of seafaring as a practice; a harbor equipped by him to function as a port was said to have been named in his honor.

== Father of Palamedes ==
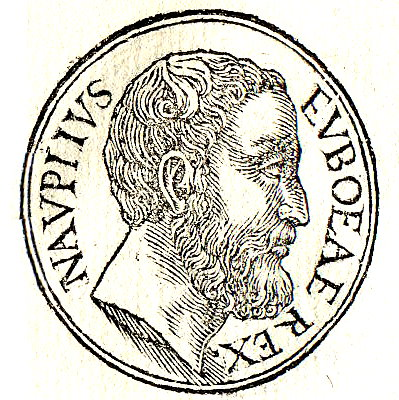
Nauplius, father of Palamedes

Nauplius, also called "Nauplius the Wrecker", was a king of Euboea, and the father of Palamedes. According to Apollodorus, the son of Poseidon and Amymone, and the father of Palamedes are one person who "lived to a great age". Apollodorus reports that in the Nostoi (Returns), an early epic from the Trojan cycle of poems about the Trojan War, Nauplius' wife was Philyra, and that according to Cercops his wife was Hesione, but that according to the "tragic poets" his wife was Clymene. In addition to Palamedes, Nauplius had two other sons, Oeax and Nausimedon.

There are three prominent stories associated with this Nauplius. Two of these stories involve Nauplius being called upon by two kings to dispose of their unwanted daughters. The third is the story of Nauplius' revenge for the unjust killing of Palamedes, by the Greeks during the Trojan War.

=== Aerope and Clymene ===
According to the tradition followed by Euripides in his lost play Cretan Women (Kressai), Catreus, the king of Crete, found his daughter Aerope in bed with a slave and handed her over to Nauplius to be drowned, but Nauplius spared Aerope's life and she married Pleisthenes, who was the king of Mycenae. Sophocles, in his play Ajax, may also refer to Aerope's father Catreus finding her in bed with some man, and handing her over to Nauplius to be drowned, but the possibly corrupt text may instead refer to Aerope's husband Atreus finding her in bed with Thyestes, and having her drowned. However, according to another tradition, known to Apollodorus, Catreus, because an oracle had said that he would be killed by one of his children, gave his daughters Aerope and Clymene to Nauplius to sell in a foreign land, but instead Nauplius gave Aerope to Pleisthenes (as in Euripides) and himself took Clymene as his wife.

=== Auge ===
A similar story to that of Aerope's, is that of Auge, the daughter of Aleus, king of Tegea, and the mother of the hero Telephus. Sophocles wrote a tragedy Aleadae (The sons of Aleus), which told the story of Auge and Telephus. The play is lost and only fragments remain, but a declamation attributed to the fourth century BC orator Alcidamas probably used Sophocles' Aleadae for one of its sources. According to Alcidamas and others, Aleus discovered that Auge was pregnant and gave her to Nauplius to be drowned, but instead Nauplius sold her to the Mysian king Teuthras.

=== Nauplius' revenge ===
Nauplius' son Palamedes fought in the Trojan War, but was killed by his fellow Greeks, as a result of Odysseus' treachery. Nauplius went to Troy to demand justice for the death of his son, but met with no success. Consequently, Nauplius sought revenge against King Agamemnon and the other Greek leaders. When Agamemnon's section of the Greek fleet was sailing home from Troy, they were caught in a great storm—the storm in which Ajax the Lesser died—off the perilous southern coastline of Euboea, at Cape Caphereus, a notorious place which later became known by the name Xylophagos ('Eater of Timber'). Taking advantage of the situation Nauplius lit beacon fires on the rocks, luring the Greek sailors to steer for the fires, thinking they marked a safe harbor, and many ships were shipwrecked as a result. Hyginus adds that Nauplius killed any Greeks who managed to swim ashore.

Nauplius also somehow induced the wives of three of the Greek commanders to be unfaithful to their husbands: Agamemnon's wife Clytemnestra with Aegisthus, Diomedes' wife Aegiale with Cometes, and Idomeneus' wife Meda with Leucos. Oeax and Nausimedon were apparently killed by Pylades as they arrived to aid Aegisthus. Nauplius also was said to have convinced Odysseus' mother Anticleia that her son was dead, whereupon she hanged herself.

According to Plutarch, a location on Euboea was referred to as "the Young Men's Club" because when Nauplius came to Chalcis as a suppliant, both being prosecuted by the Achaeans and charging against them, the city's people provided him with a guard of young men, which was stationed at this place.

According to Apollodorus, the setting of false beacon fires was a habit of Nauplius, and he himself died in the same way.

==== Early sources ====
Homer mentions the storm and the death of Ajax at the "great rocks of Gyrae" (Odyssey 4.500) but nowhere mentions Palamedes or Nauplius' revenge. The location Gyrae is uncertain, though some later sources locate it near Cape Caphereus. However the Nostoi probably did tell the story, since we know, from Apollodorus, that Nauplius was mentioned in the poem, and according to Proclus' summary of the Nostoi the storm occurred at Cape Caphereus.

The story of Palamedes death, and Nauplius' revenge was a popular one, by at least the fifth century BC. The tragedians Aeschylus, Sophocles and Euripides all wrote plays which apparently dealt with the story. Each had a play titled Palamedes. In addition, we know of two titles, Nauplios Katapleon (Nauplius Sails In) and Nauplios Pyrkaeus (Nauplius Lights a Fire), for plays attributed to Sophocles. Though these are possibly two names for the same play, they are probably two distinct plays. If so, then Nauplios Katapleon might have dealt with either Nauplius' voyage to the Greek camp at Troy to demand justice for his son's death, or to his sail around Greece corrupting the Greek commanders' wives. In any case, Nauplios Pyrkaeus, seems certainly to have been about "Nauplius the Wrecker" and his lighting false beacon fires.

All of these plays are lost, and only testimonia and fragments remain. A fragment of Aeschylus' Palamedes ("On account of what injury did you kill my son?") seems to assure that in that play, Nauplius came to Troy and protested his son's death. Sophocles has Nauplius give a speech in defense of Palamedes, listing his many inventions and discoveries, which much benefitted the Greek army. In Euripides' Palamedes, Nauplius' son Oeax, who was with his brother Palamedes at Troy, decides to inform their father of the death of Palamedes, by inscribing the story on several oar-blades and casting them into the sea, in hopes that one would float back to Greece and be found by Nauplius. The attempt apparently succeeds and Nauplius comes to Troy.

Several other plays also, presumably, dealt with this story. Philocles, Aeschlyus' nephew and a contemporary of Euripides, wrote a play titled Nauplius. Nauplius, and Palamedes, were the titles of two plays by the 4th century BC Attic tragedian Astydamas the Younger, And the 3rd century BC poet Lycophron also wrote a play with the title Nauplius.

== The Argonaut ==
Nauplius was also the name of one of the Argonauts, who was one of those who volunteered to steer the Argo after Tiphys' death. According to Apollonius of Rhodes, he was the son of Clytonaeus and a direct descendant of the son of Poseidon and Amymone, via the lineage: Nauplius – Proetus – Lernus – Naubolus – Clytoneus – Nauplius. However, for Hyginus, the son of Poseidon was the same person as the Argonaut. Although it would be more plausible for an Argonaut to be still alive at the time of the Trojan War, than for a son of Poseidon and Amymone, and therefore more plausible for the father of Palamedes to be the same as the Argonaut (rather than being the son of Poseidon), no surviving ancient source identifies the Argonaut with the father of Palamedes.

== Namesake ==
- 9712 Nauplius, Jovian asteroid named after Nauplius
- Nauplion, a city and Greece's second modern capital.
