= Naïs (mythology) =

Several women in Greek mythology

In Greek mythology, Naïs (Ancient Greek: Ναΐς, romanized: Naïs, lit. 'water nymph', 'river nymph' or 'she who flows') is the name of the following figures:

- Naïs, the mother of Chiron in one version.
- Naïs, the mother of King Hypseus of the Lapiths, by the river-god Peneus. In some accounts, the mother of Hypseus was called Philyra or Creusa. In another version of the myth, the latter was called the daughter of Naïs and Peneus instead.
- Naïs, a nymph who used herbs to transform her lovers into various fishes, until she suffered the same fate.
- Naïs, a nymph and the mother of the river-god Achelous by Oceanus.
- Naïs, the mother, in one version, of Glaucus by Poseidon.

== Bibliography ==
- Athenaeus. The Deipnosophists. Or Banquet Of The Learned Of Athenaeus. London. Henry G. Bohn, York Street, Covent Garden. 1854.
- Pseudo-Plutarch, Names of Rivers and Mountains, in Plutarch, The Moralia, translations edited by William Watson Goodwin (1831-1912), from the edition of 1878, a text in the public domain digitized by the Internet Archive and reformatted/lightly corrected by Brady Kiesling.
- Ovid, Metamorphoses, Volume I: Books 1-8. Translated by Frank Justus Miller. Revised by G. P. Goold. Loeb Classical Library 42. Cambridge, MA: Harvard University Press, 1916.
