= Oresthasium =

Town of ancient Arcadia

Coordinates: 37°20′46″N 22°12′23″E

Oresthasium or Oressthasion (Ancient Greek: Ὀρεσθάσιον), or Orestheium or Orestheion (Ὀρέσθειον), or Oresteium or Oresteion (Ὀρέστειον), was a town in the south of ancient Arcadia, in the district of Maenalia, a little to the right of the road leading from Megalopolis to Pallantium and Tegea. It was, according to myth, founded by Orestheus, King of Arcadia, but it was also mythologically connected to Orestes. In historical times, it formed part of the territory of Maenalus, but, upon the foundation of Megalopolis in 371 BCE, Oresthasium was abandoned and incorporated into Megalopolis. Its territory is called Oresthis by Thucydides, and in it was situated Ladoceia, which became a suburb of Megalopolis.

Its site is located near the modern Anemodouri.
