= Antion =

Antion (Ancient Greek pronunciation: [antíɔːn] or /ˈæn.ti.ɒn/; Ancient Greek: Ἀντίων, romanized: Antíōn), in Greek mythology, was the eldest son of Periphas and Astyaguia (daughter of Hypseus), who were distantly related. According to legend, he was the great-grandson of Apollo, his paternal grandfather being Lapithus, the son of Apollo and Stilbe and patriot of the Lapith people.

Antion married Perimele, and they became parents of the legendary demi-god Ixion. It is sometimes said that Ares was Ixion's father, although some sources have Phlegyas or Leonteus as the real father.
