= Evippe =

Evippe may refer to:

- Euippe or Evippe, any one of six women in Greek mythology
- Evippe (genus), a genus of moth in the family Gelechiidae
