= Creusa (naiad) =

Deity in Greek mythology

In Greek mythology, Creusa (/kriːˈuːsə/; Ancient Greek: Κρέουσα, romanized: Kreousa) was a Thessalian naiad nymph and daughter of Gaia (Earth).

== Family ==
Creusa bore Hypseus, the future king of the Lapiths, and Stilbe to the river god Peneus. Through Hypseus, she was the grandmother of Cyrene, one of the best known lovers of Apollo while her daughter, Stilbe, gave birth to twin sons to the same god. These sons were Lapithes and Centaurus progenitors of the warrior tribe, Lapiths and the wild half-beasts, Centaurs.

In another version of the myth, Creusa was called the daughter of Peneus and Naïs. According to Pherecydes, the latter was also the reputed mother of Hypseus by the same river god. In one account, the mother of the Lapith king was called Philyra.

== Mythology ==
=== Pindar's Account ===
"...in the renowned glens of Mt. Pindus a Naiad bore him (Hypseus), Creusa the daughter of Gaia, delighting in the bed of the river-god Peneius."

=== Diodorus Siculus' Account ===
"He (Peneus) lay with the nymph named Creüsa and begat as children Hypseus and Stilbê, and with the latter Apollo lay and begat Lapithes and Centaurus."
