= Pareia =

Creature in Greek mythology

In Greek mythology, Pareia or Paria (Ancient Greek: Παρείας means 'reddish-brown snake') was a Parian nymph and concubine of King Minos of Crete. By the latter, she mothered Eurymedon, Nephalion, Chryses, and Philolaus. These men were later on slain by the hero Heracles after they killed two of his comrades.
