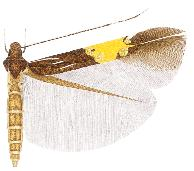

Scientific classification
- Kingdom: Animalia
- Phylum: Arthropoda
- Clade: Pancrustacea
- Class: Insecta
- Order: Lepidoptera
- Family: Cosmopterigidae
- Genus: Cosmopterix
- Species: C. hermippe

Binomial name
- Cosmopterix hermippe Koster, 2010

= Cosmopterix hermippe =

Species of moth

Cosmopterix hermippe is a moth of the family Cosmopterigidae. It is known from the Federal District of Brazil.

Adults have been recorded in March.

== Description ==
Female. Forewing length 4.0 mm. Head: frons shining ochreous-grey with greenish and reddish and reflections, vertex and neck tufts dark bronze brown with reddish gloss, collar dark bronze brown; labial palpus first segment very short, ochreous-grey, second segment three-quarters of the length of third, dark brown with white longitudinal lines laterally and ventrally, third segment white, lined dark brown laterally; scape dorsally shining dark brown with a white anterior line, ventrally shining white, antenna shining dark brown with a white line from base to beyond one-half, interrupted in middle, followed towards apex by five dark brown segments, six white, two dark brown, two white, ten dark brown and eight white segments at apex. Thorax and tegulae shining dark bronze brown with reddish gloss. Legs: dark brown with reddish gloss, femora of midleg and hindleg shining ochreous-grey, foreleg with a white line on tibia and tarsal segments one and two, segment four with white apical spot, segment five entirely white, tibia of midleg with white oblique basal and medial lines and a white apical ring, tarsal segments one, two and four with white apical rings, segment five entirely white, tibia of hindleg with a white oblique medial line and a white apical ring, tarsal segment one with a white basal spot and an ochreous apical ring, segments two and three with ochreous apical rings, segment four dorsally and segment five entirely ochreous-white, spurs white, ventrally greyish brown. Forewing dark bronze brown with reddish gloss, three white lines in the basal area, a subcostal from base to one-quarter, slightly bending from costa in distal half, a short medial above fold, ending just beyond the subcostal, a subdorsal below fold, about as long as the medial, but slightly further from base, some indistinct white edging on dorsum beyond base, and sometimes an indistinct and very narrow short costal just before the transverse fascia, but not connected with it, a broad yellow transverse fascia beyond the middle with a very small and narrow apical protrusion, bordered at inner edge by two pale golden metallic tubercular subcostal and subdorsal spots the subcostal spot outwardly edged by a small patch of blackish brown scales, the subdorsal spot slightly further from base and a little larger than the costal, bordered at the outer edge by two similarly coloured costal and dorsal spots, the dorsal spot three times as large as the costal and more towards base, both spots inwardly partly lined dark brown, a white costal streak from outer costal spot, a narrow apical line from or just beyond the apical protrusion, slightly widening towards apex, cilia dark brown around apex, paler towards dorsum. Hindwing shining dark greyish brown. Underside: forewing shining greyish brown, the white streak in the apical cilia distinctly visible, hindwing shining greyish brown. Abdomen dorsally greyish brown, mixed orange, segments banded greyish brown posteriorly, laterally greyish brown, ventrally shining dark grey, segments banded shining white posteriorly, anal tuft brownish grey.

== Etymology ==
The species is named after Hermippe, a moon of Jupiter. To be treated as a noun in apposition.
