= Ladoceia =

Ladoceia or Ladokeia (Ancient Greek: (τὰ Λαδόκεια), also known as Laodicium or Laodikion (Λαοδίκιον), was a place in ancient Arcadia, in the district Maenalia, and, after the building of Megalopolis, a suburb of that city. It was situated upon the road from the latter to Pallantium and Tegea. Here a battle was fought between the Mantineians and Tegeatae, 423 BCE, and between the Achaeans and Spartan king Cleomenes III, 226 BCE. Thucydides places it in the district of Oresthis.

Its site is unlocated.
