= Chlidanope =

Character in Greek mythology

In Greek mythology, Chlidanope (Ancient Greek: Χλιδανώπη, romanized: Khlidanṓpē) was the naiad wife of King Hypseus of Lapiths, son of the river-god Peneus. The couple had four daughters: Cyrene, Themisto, Alcaea and Astyagyia.
