= Chryses (mythology) =

Greek mythological characters

Chryses (/ˈkraɪsiːz/; Ancient Greek: Χρύσης, romanized: Khrúsēs, lit. 'golden') was the name that may refer to one of the following figures in Greek mythology:

- Chryses or Chrysen, son of Zeus and Isonoe, and one of the Danaides.
- Chryses, the successor of Phlegyas, as king of Orchomenus. He was the son of Poseidon and Chrysogeneia, daughter of King Almus of Halmones, and the possible father of the eponym Minyas.
- Chryses, one of the four sons of Minos and Pareia. He lived in the island of Paros together with his three brothers: Eurymedon, Nephalion and Philolaus. When Heracles arrived at the port of the island during the execution of his ninth task, two of his men went ashore. The four brothers killed these two men without any reason. The hero, furious about this pointless act immediately landed and in turn slayed the sons of Minos.
- Chryses, Trojan priest and father of Chryseis.
- Chryses, grandson of the precedent through Chryseis and Agamemnon. After his mother was released shortly as a prisoner and allowed to return to her hometown, she gave birth to Chryses in the city of Thebes in Asia Minor. Many years later, Orestes arrived with Iphigenia and Pylades to Zminthe and were seized by Chryses, who decided to return them to King Thoas and the Taurians. But through his grandfather Chryses, he learned that they were also children of Agamemnon. So Chryses, joining his forces to those of his half-brother Orestes, attacked the Taurians and killed their king Thoas. After this, Chryses goes with Orestes and Iphigenia to Mycenae to visit the grave of their father Agamemnon. Yet some say that the father of Chryses was Apollo.

== See also ==
- Chryseis (mythology)
