= Pallas (son of Lycaon) =

Mythological Greek prince

- Eponymous King of Pallantion
- Member of the Arcadian Royal Family
- Abode: Arcadia
- Parents: Lycaon and Cyllene or Nonacris
- Offspring: Chryse

In Greek mythology, Pallas (/ˈpæləs/ PAL-əs; Ancient Greek: Πάλλας) was an Arcadian prince and the eponymous founder of the Arcadian town of Pallantion. He was the teacher of Athena, who, according to local myths, was born in Aliphera.

== Family ==
Pallas was one of the 50 sons of the impious King Lycaon either by the naiad Cyllene, Nonacris or by unknown woman. He had a daughter, Chryse who married Dardanus and brought the Palladium to Troy.

Stone statues of Pallas and his grandson Evander were extant in Pallantium in Pausanias' times. Roman authors used Pallas' name to provide an etiology for the name of the hill Palatium.

== Mythology ==
Pallas, his brothers, and his father King Lycaon, were the most nefarious and carefree of all people. To test them, Zeus visited them in the form of a peasant. Lycaon mixed the entrails of his youngest son, Nyctimus, into the god's meal, whereupon the enraged king of the gods threw the meal over the table. Pallas was killed, along with his brothers and their father, by a lightning bolt of the god.
