= Orchomenus (mythology) =

Several figures in Greek mythology

In Greek mythology, the name Orchomenus (/ɔːrˈkɒmɪnəs/; Ancient Greek: Ὀρχομενός, romanized: Orkhomenós) may refer to:

- Orchomenus, an Arcadian prince as one of the 50 sons of the impious King Lycaon either by the naiad Cyllene, Nonacris or by an unknown woman. He was the founder and eponym of Orchomenus (Arcadia), as well as founder of Methydrium. One account called him the father of Arcas. Orchomenus and his siblings were the most nefarious and carefree of all people. To test them, Zeus visited them in the form of a peasant. These brothers mixed the entrails of a child into the god's meal, whereupon the enraged king of the gods threw the meal over the table. Orchomenus was killed, along with his brothers and their father, by a lightning bolt of the god.
- Orchomenus, a king, the father of Elara.
- Orchomenus, son of Zeus and the Danaid Isonoe (Isione). He was the husband of Hermippe and legal father of Minyas whose biological father was Poseidon. In some accounts, Orchomenus was regarded as the son of Zeus and Hermippe instead.
- Orchomenus, a son of Minyas and Phanosyra, thus grandson of the above (note though that there were multiple versions of Minyas' parentage). He succeeded to Minyas' power and had his domain, the Boeotian Orchomenus, named after himself. He received Hyettus who had fled Argos over the murder of Molurus, and assigned to him a tract of land. According to one source, Orchomenus died without issue, and his kingdom was handed over to Presbon, a son of Phrixus; in an alternate version though, he was father of Aspledon, Amphidocus and Clymenus, of whom the latter was his successor. He may be the Orchomenus who is given as father of Chloris, the consort of Ampycus.
- Orchomenus, son of Eteocles and brother of Minyas, in a rare genealogy; essentially the same as the above.
- Orchomenus, a son of Athamas and Themisto and brother of Sphincius according to Hyginus.
- Orchomenus, one of the sons of Thyestes by a naiad whose flesh was served to their own father by Atreus. His two brothers were Aglaus and Calaeus.
