= Andreus =

Men in Greek mythology

In Greek mythology, Andreus (/ˈændriəs/; Ancient Greek: Ἀνδρεύς, romanized: Andreús, lit. 'manly') may refer to two distinct individuals:

- Andreus, son of the river-god Peneus in Thessaly, from whom the district about Orchomenos in Boeotia was called Andreis. With Evippe, daughter of Leucon, Andreus had a son Eteocles, his successor.
- Andreus, in another passage Pausanias speaks of Andreus (it is, however, uncertain whether he means the same man as the former) as the person who first colonized the island of Andros, Greece. According to Diodorus Siculus, Andreus was one of the generals of Rhadamanthys, from whom he received the island afterwards called Andros as a present. Stephanus of Byzantium, Conon and Ovid call this first colonizer "Andrus" (son of Anius) and not Andreus.
