= Minyas (mythology) =

Mythical king of Orchomenus

In Greek mythology, Minyas (/ˈmɪniəs, ˈmɪnjəs/; Ancient Greek: Μινύας) was the founder of Orchomenus, Boeotia.

== Family ==
As the ancestor of the Minyans, a number of Boeotian genealogies lead back to him, according to the classicist H.J. Rose. Accounts vary as to his own parentage:

- Orchomenus and Hermippe, his real father being Poseidon;
- Poseidon either by (1) the Oceanid Callirhoe; (2) Tritogeneia, daughter of Aeolus; (3) Euryanassa, daughter of Hyperphas or lastly, Chrysogone, daughter of Almus;
- father is only mentioned as (1) Aeolus; (2) Sisyphus; (3) Chryses, son of Poseidon and Chrysogeneia; (4) Eteocles or (5) Ares (6) Aleus and lastly (7) Halmus (Almus).

Minyas was married to Tritolenia (Tritogeneia), Clytodora, or Phanosyra, daughter of Paion. The following are the children of Minyas by one of his supposed wives:

- By Clytodora, Presbon, Eteoclymene and Periclymene;
- By Phanosyra, Orchomenus, Diochthondas and Athamas;
- Clymene, also called Periclymene, mother of Iphiclus and Alcimede by Phylacus or Cephalus;
- Cyparissus, the founder of Anticyra;
- the Minyades, three daughters who were turned into bats;
- Persephone, wife of Amphion (son of Iasus) and mother of Chloris and Phylomache, respectively the wives of Neleus and Pelias; and lastly
- Elara, the mother of the giant Tityus.

Comparative table of Minyas' family
Relation	Name	Sources																	
Relation	Name	Hom.	Hes.	Pindar			Apollon.		Ovid	Apd.	Plut.	Hyg.	Pau.	Ant.	Aelian	Steph.	Eust.	Tzet.	W. Smith
Relation	Name	Sch. Ody.	Fr.	Sch. Pyth	Sch. Isth.	Sch. Oly	Arg.	Sch.	Meta.	Apd.	Gk. Qs.	Fab.	Pau.	Ant.	Aelian	Steph.	Odys.	Lyco.	W. Smith
Parentage	Poseidon and Euryanassa	✓	✓																
Parentage	Poseidon and Tritogeneia			✓															
Parentage	Eteocles				✓														
Parentage	Aeolus						✓												
Parentage	Poseidon and Hermippe							✓											
Parentage	Poseidon and Chrysogone							✓											
Parentage	Chryses												✓						
Parentage	Orchomenus													✓					
Parentage	Poseidon and Callirhoe																	✓	
Parentage	Ares																		✓
Parentage	Aleus																		✓
Parentage	Sisyphus																		✓
Parentage	Halmus																		✓
Wife	Tritolenia																		✓
Wife	Clytodora																		✓
Wife	Phanosyra																		✓
Children	Clymene	✓					✓			✓		✓	✓						
Children	Elara	✓															✓		
Children	Eteoclymene				✓														
Children	Diochthondas				✓														
Children	Orchomenus							✓					✓						
Children	Athamas							✓											
Children	Presbon							✓											
Children	Leuconoe or								✓										
Children	Leucippe										✓			✓	✓				
Children	Alcithoe or								✓						✓				
Children	Alcathoe										✓			✓					
Children	Arsinoe or										✓								
Children	Arsippe or													✓					
Children	Aristippe														✓				
Children	Periclymene											✓						✓	
Children	Cyparissus															✓			
Children	Persephone	✓																	

== Mythology ==
According to Apollonius Rhodius and Pausanias, Minyas was the first king to have made a treasury, of which the ruins were still extant in Pausanias' times.

== See also ==
- Graïke
- Graia
- Persephone
- Chloris
