= Themisto =

Mythical daughter of Hypseus

In Greek mythology, Themisto (/θəˈmɪstoʊ/; Ancient Greek: Θεμιστώ, romanized: Themistṓ, lit. 'belonging to the law or customs') was a Thessalian princess as the daughter of King Hypseus of Lapiths and the naiad Chlidanope. Her name is derived from the Ancient Greek word: "θεμιστος" which means "belonging to the law", or "belonging to the customs".

== Family ==
Themisto's sisters were Cyrene, Alcaea and Astyagyia. She was the third and last wife of Athamas, a Boeotian king. According to some sources, the couple had four children: Leucon, Erythrius, Schoeneus, and Ptous. In other sources, there were but two: Sphincius and Orchomenus, or else Schoeneus and Leucon. Some say that the father of Leucon was Poseidon (see also Leuconoe).

== Mythology ==
Themisto intended to kill her husband's children by his previous wife, but accidentally slew her own sons. This was the subject of a non-surviving tragedy by Euripides, retold by Hyginus as follows. Athamas married Themisto as he believed his second wife, Ino, was dead, but Ino turned out to be alive and to have been on Mount Parnassus with the Maenads. Athamas had her brought home but kept her return a secret; Themisto did find out she was back, and resolved to kill Ino's children as an act of revenge. However, she had never seen Ino in person and took her for a servant as they met, and ordered the "servant" to dress all her own children in white clothing, and Ino's in black. Themisto then proceeded to kill all the black-clothed children. What Themisto did not realise was that Ino had switched the children's clothing, and so she in fact killed her own children. Upon discovering that, she killed herself. According to Pseudo-Apollodorus, however, Themisto married Athamas after the death of Ino, and the whole story with the murder of the children did not take place.
