= Alcaea =

Thessalin princess in Greek mythology

In Greek mythology, Alcaea (Ancient Greek: Άλκαία, romanized: Alkaía, lit. 'mighty') may refer to the following women:

- Alcaea, Thessalian princess as the daughter of King Hypseus of Lapiths and the naiad Chlidanope. She was the sister of Cyrene, Themisto and Astyaguia.
- Alkaia, an Amazon who was depicted in an amphora fighting Heracles together with two other Amazons — Andromache and unnamed one. She was shown as standing over Andromache on her left, defending the latter with spear and shield. Alkaia was portrayed to have long tresses, high-crested helmet with cheek-pieces, short purple chiton and cuirass.
