= Oeax (mythology) =

Son of Nauplius in Greek mythology

In Greek and Roman mythology, Oeax (Ancient Greek: Οἴαξ, romanized: Oíax, lit. 'handle of rudder, tiller') was a Euboean prince as the son of King Nauplius.

== Family ==
Oeax's mother has been variously named as Clymene, Hesione or Philyra. He was also the brother of Nausimedon and Palamedes, a Greek warrior at the Trojan War.

== Mythology ==
Oeax accompanied his brother Palamedes to Troy. In the aftermath of Palamedes' murder by Odysseus, he inscribed a message on oar-blades to their father, Nauplius, who came to the camp of the Greeks and threatened Agamemnon, though he left empty-handed. In response, the Greeks attempted to throw Oeax in the sea, but he was rescued by the Nereids.

Because Oeax was angry at the Greeks for killing Palamedes at Troy, he falsely told Clytemnestra about Agamemnon bringing back Cassandra, a Trojan concubine, which led to Clytemnestra plotting to kill Agamemnon. Dictys also credits him with turning the wife of Diomedes, Aegiale, against him as well. Later, Oeax tried to banish Orestes after the latter murdered his mother Clytemnestra. Ultimately, Oeax and his brother Nausimedon were killed by Pylades after helping Aegisthus in his fight with Orestes.
