= Astyaguia =

Thessalin princess in Greek mythology

In Greek mythology, Astyaguia or Astyagyia (Ancient Greek: Ἀστυάγυια) was a Thessalin princess as the daughter of King Hypseus of Lapiths and probably the naiad Chlidanope. She was the sister of Cyrene, Themisto and Alcaea. Astyaguia married Periphas, son of Lapithus, and they had eight sons, the oldest of whom was Antion who became the father of Ixion by Perimela, daughter of Amythaon.
