= Chryse (island) =

Former island in the Aegean mentioned in Greek mythology

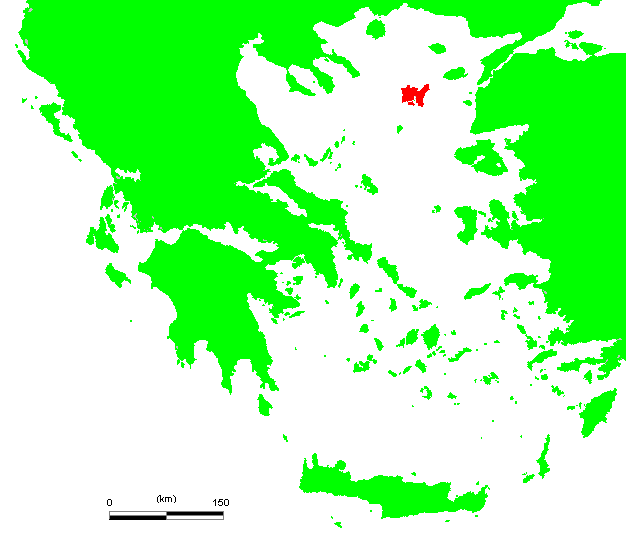
Lemnos

Chryse (/ˈkraɪsi, ˈkraɪzi/; Ancient Greek: Χρύση, romanized: Khrýsē, lit. 'golden'), also called Lemnian Chryse, was a small island in the Aegean Sea near Lemnos, mentioned by Homer and Sophocles. By the second century, Pausanias and Appian say that it had sunk below the sea. Its location is unknown.

== Overview ==
The island's main feature was said to be its temple to Apollo, and its patron deity was the goddess Chryse. The Greek archer Philoctetes stopped there on his way to Troy and was bitten by a viper. Lucullus captured three men there in an ambush during the Third Mithridatic War. The island seems to have disappeared by the second century AD. An ancient oracle (written by Onomacritus) may have predicted this end.

The Description of Greece says:

The following incident proves the might of Fortune to be greater and more marvellous than is shown by the disasters and prosperity of cities. No long sail from Lemnos was once an island Chryse, where, it is said, Philoctetes met with his accident from the water-snake. But the waves utterly overwhelmed it, and Chryse sank and disappeared in the depths ... So temporary and utterly weak are the fortunes of men.

— Pausanias, Description of Greece

== Proposed sites ==
An amateur underwater archaeologist claimed to have rediscovered the island in 1960, identifying it with "a sunken land mass known as Kharos Bank, a 10-sq.-mi. area near the island of Lemnos" (39.91667°N 25.5500°E), listed on British naval charts and located about 40 feet (12 m) below the surface. White building blocks (presumably from Apollo's temple) were said to be visible on the sea floor. The Kharos Bank is mentioned by others as a possible site, but there does not appear to have been further work on it.

Another theory proposes that the remains of Chryse are on a small islet only 70–80 m off the north coast of Lemnos, locally known as Varvara (39.9984°N 25.1537°E). Though the islet has a "heavy concentration of ancient foundations and fragments of pottery", and a large mound at its summit surrounded by walls (possibly an altar), it has not been excavated. It was apparently larger in antiquity, and large parts have sunk because of tectonic activity.
