= Chryse (mythology) =

Set of characters in Greek mythology

In Greek mythology, the name Chryse (Ancient Greek: Χρύση or Χρυσῆ, romanized: Khrysē or Khrū́sē may refer to:

- Chryse, an Arcadian princess as the daughter of Pallas, son of King Lycaon. She was the wife of Dardanus and became the mother of his sons, Idaeus and Deimas.
- Chryse, a Minyan princess as the daughter of King Almus of Orchomenus and sister of Chrysogeneia. She was the lover of Ares and mother of Phlegyas.
- Chryse, a nymph or minor goddess of Lemnos (or of Chryse Island) who lured Philoctetes away from his companions which resulted in him being bitten by a snake. Some sources state that Chryse was a local epithet of Athena, and the misfortune happened to Philoctetes next to her altar, which the snake was guarding. The altar was said to have been set up by Jason.
- Chryse, daughter of Timander, sister of Eurytione, Hellotis and Cottyto, from Corinth.
- Chryse, a surname of Aphrodite on Lesbos.
