= Leucon =

In Greek mythology, the name Leucon (/ˈljuːkɒn/; Ancient Greek: Λεύκων, romanized: Leukōn) may refer to:

- Leucon, a son of Themisto by either Athamas or Poseidon. His children were Erythras, Pisidice, Hyperippe and Euippe (mother of Eteocles by Andreus). He was said to have died of a sickness.
- Leucon, one of Actaeon's dogs.
- Leucon, in Plutarch's Life of Aristides, one of the seven heroes to whom the Athenians, according to an oracle, had to sacrifice if they wanted to overcome their foes in the imminent battle. The other six were Androcrates, Peisandrus, Damocrates, Hypsion, Actaeon and Polyeidus.
