= Hermippe (moon) =

Moon of Jupiter

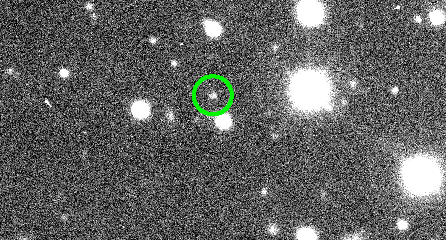
- Discovery image of Hermippe by the Canada-France-Hawaii Telescope in December 2001

Discovery
- Discovered by: Scott S. Sheppard; David C. Jewitt; Jan T. Kleyna
- Discovery site: Mauna Kea Observatory
- Discovery date: 9 December 2001

Designations
- Designation: Jupiter XXX
- Pronunciation: /hɜːrˈmɪpiː/
- Named after: Ἑρμίππη Hermippē
- Alternative names: S/2001 J 3
- Adjectives: Hermippean /hɜːrmɪˈpiːən/

Orbital characteristics
- Epoch 17 December 2020 (JD 2459200.5)
- Observation arc: 24 years 2025-12-21 (last obs)
- Semi-major axis: 0.1381428 AU (20,665,870 km)
- Eccentricity: 0.1982520
- Orbital period (sidereal): –606.93 d
- Mean anomaly: 169.67605°
- Mean motion: 0° 35^{m} 35.347^{s} / day
- Inclination: 146.76001° (to ecliptic)
- Longitude of ascending node: 37.24213°
- Argument of perihelion: 356.27211°
- Satellite of: Jupiter
- Group: Ananke group

Physical characteristics
- Mean diameter: 4 km
- Albedo: 0.04 (assumed)
- Spectral type: B–V = 0.73 ± 0.05, V–R = 0.49 ± 0.04
- Apparent magnitude: 22.1
- Absolute magnitude (H): 15.5

Hermippe /hɜːrˈmɪpiː/, also known as Jupiter XXX, is a natural satellite of Jupiter. It was discovered concurrently with Eurydome by a team of astronomers from the Institute for Astronomy of the University of Hawaiʻi led by David Jewitt and Scott S. Sheppard and Jan Kleyna in 2001, and given the temporary designation S/2001 J 3.

Hermippe is about 4 kilometres in diameter, and orbits Jupiter at an average distance of 21.5 million kilometers in about 630 days, at an inclination of 151° to the ecliptic (149° to Jupiter's equator), in a retrograde direction and with an eccentricity of 0.2290.

It was named in August 2003 by the International Astronomical Union, after Hermippe, a lover of Zeus (Jupiter).

Hermippe belongs to the Ananke group, retrograde irregular moons which orbit Jupiter between 19,300,000 kilometres (0.129 astronomical units) and 22,700,000 km (0.152 AU), at inclinations of roughly 150°.

Discovery image of Hermippe and Eurydome together taken in December 2001
