= Almus (son of Sisyphus) =

In Greek mythology, Halmus or Almus (/ˈælməs/; Ancient Greek: Ἄλμος, romanized: Hálmos), also Holmos (Ὅλμος), was a Corinthian prince who later founded the Boeotian town of Halmones or Holmones, in the neighborhood of Orchomenus.

== Family ==
Almus was the son of King Sisyphus of Corinth and the Pleiad Merope, daughter of the Titan Atlas. He was the brother of Glaucus, Ornytion (Porphyrion) and Thersandrus.

Halmus had two daughters, Chryse and Chrysogeneia, who consorted with Ares and Poseidon, respectively. Chryse's son with Ares was Phlegyas who inherited the kingdom of Orchomenus as King Eteocles had died childless. Chrysogeneia had by Poseidon a son Chryses who succeeded Phlegyas as king of Orchomenus and in his turn became father of Minyas. In another account, the second daughter was named as Chrysogone and Minyas was given as her son by Poseidon, and not the grandson. Almus was also credited as the possible father of Minyas.

== Mythology ==
Most of the available information concerning Halmus was recorded in Pausanias' Description of Greece. According to the said author, Almus received a small tract of land in Orchomenus from King Eteocles and dwelt there; the village was believed to have been named Almones (later Olmones) after him. This was also mentioned by Stephanus of Byzantium, who referred to Pausanias' work but called the character as Olmus (Ὄλμος) to account for the most recent form of the village's name.
