= Chrysogeneia =

In Greek mythology, Chrysogeneia or Chrysogenia (Ancient Greek: Χρυσογένεια) may refer to the two different individuals:

- Chrysogenia, daughter of the river-god Peneus, and thus can be considered a naiad. She was the mother of Thissaeus by Zeus.
- Chrysogeneia, a Minyan princess as the daughter of King Almus of Orchomenus. She was the sister of Chryse and mother, by the sea-god Poseidon, of Chryses, father of the eponym Minyas. In some myths, Minyas himself was the son of Chrysogone and Poseidon. Her name which can denote “golden” expresses the traditional opinion of the Orchomenians' wealth.
