= Nausimedon =

In Greek mythology, Nausimedon (Ancient Greek: Ναυσιμέδων or Ναυσιμέδοντα, lit. 'lord of ships' or 'ruler of ships') was a Euboean prince as the son of King Nauplius.

== Family ==
Nausimedon's mother was either Clymene (daughter of King Catreus), Hesione, or Philyra. He was the brother of Oeax and the famous Palamedes.

== Mythology ==
Nausimedon and his brother Oeax were killed by Pylades after helping Aegisthus in his fight with Orestes.
