= Hermippe =

Greek mythological figure

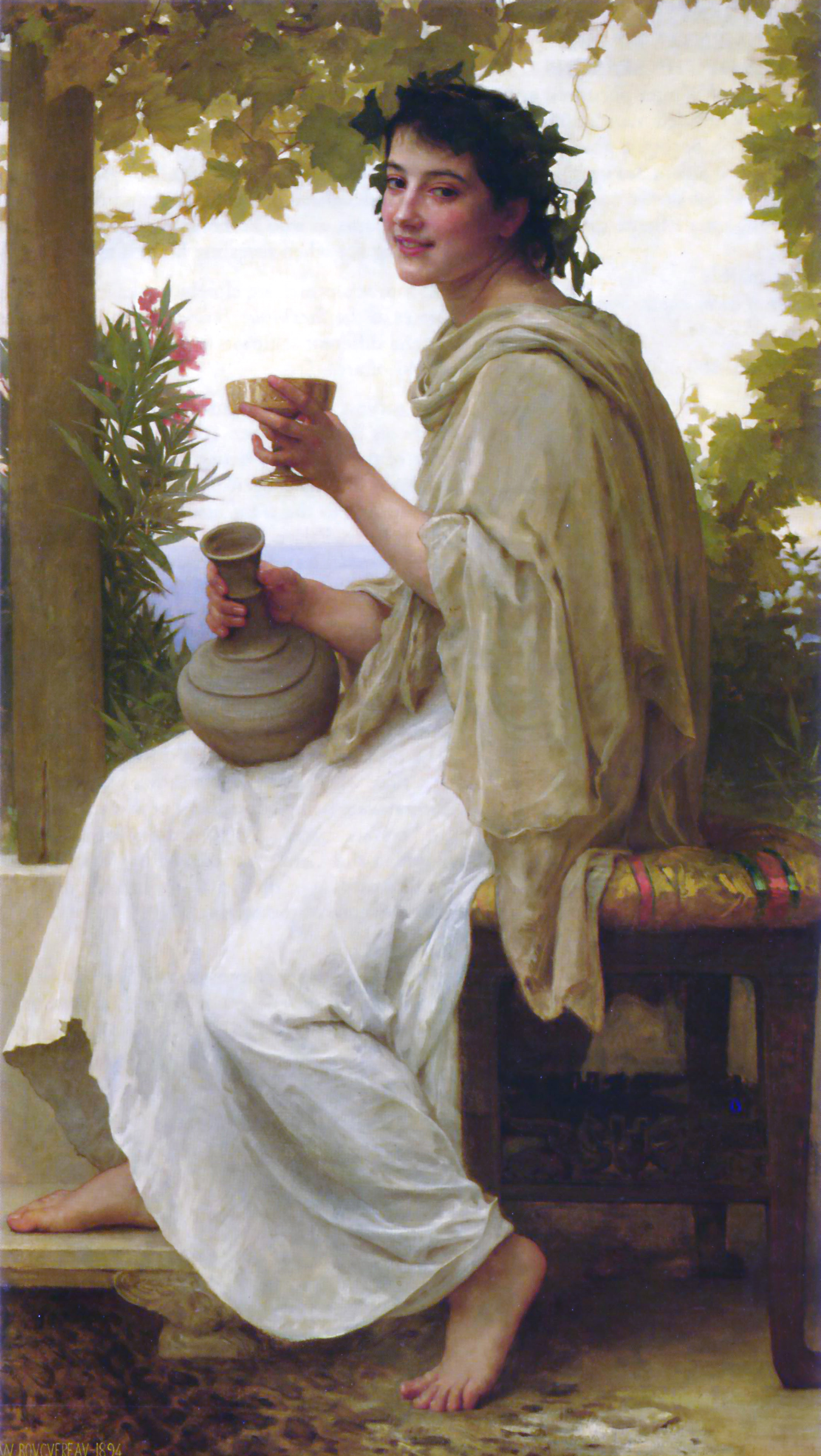
Hermippe, by William-Adolphe Bouguereau

In Greek mythology, Hermippe (Ancient Greek: Ἑρμίππη, romanized: Hermíppē) was a daughter of Boeotus. She was married to Orchomenus, son of Zeus and the Danaid Isonoe, but had a son Minyas with Poseidon. Orchomenus became legal father of her son.
