= Nephalion =

Son of Minos in Greek myth

In Greek mythology, Nephalion (Ancient Greek: Νηφαλίωνα) was one of the four sons of Minos, who lived on the Greek island of Paros. Nephalion and his brothers Eurymedon, Khryses, and Philolaus rebelled against Herakles and murdered two sailors from one of his vessels that had washed up ashore on the rocks of Paros.
