= Euippe =

Greek mythology name

Euippe /ˌjuːˈɪpi/ or Evippe /iːˈvɪpi/ (Ancient Greek: Εὐίππη, romanized: Euíppē, lit. 'good mare') is the name of eight women in Greek mythology:

- Euippe, one of the 50 Danaïdes, daughters of King Danaus of Libya (and later Argos) and the naiad Polyxo. She married (and murdered) her cousin-husband Imbrus, son of Aegyptus and Caliadne.
- Euippe, another daughter of Danaus, this time by an Ethiopian woman. She married either Argius, son of Aegyptus and a Phoenician woman.
- Euippe, another name for Hippe, daughter of Chiron.
- Euippe of Paionia, the mother, by Pierus, of the Pierides, nine sisters who challenged the Muses and, on their defeat, were turned into magpies.
- Euippe (daughter of Tyrimmas). She bore Odysseus a son, Euryalus, who was later mistakenly slain by his father.
- Euippe, daughter of Leucon. She bore Andreus a son, Eteocles, king of Orchomenus (not to be confused with Eteocles, son of Oedipus).
- Euippe, daughter of Daunus, the king of a people in Italy. She was loved by Alaenus, half-brother of Diomedes.
- Euippe, mother of Meriones by Molus. Hyginus referred to her by a different name, which survives in a corrupt form, *Melphis.
