= Acesander =

Ancient Greek historian

Acesander (Greek Ἀκέσανδρος) wrote a history of Cyrene. Plutarch speaks of a work of his respecting Libya (περί Λιβύης), which may possibly be the same work as the history of Cyrene. The time at which he lived is unknown.
