= Hypseus =

King of Lapiths

In Greek mythology, the name Hypseus (/ˈhɪpsiəs/; Ancient Greek: Ὑψεύς, romanized: Hypsēús, lit. 'one on high', derived from hypsos 'height' ) may refer to:

- Hypseus, a king of the Lapiths and son of the river god Peneus either by (1) the naiad Creusa, daughter of Gaia; (2) Philyra, daughter of Asopus or (3) Naïs. By the naiad Chlidanope he had four daughters: Cyrene, Themisto, Alcaea and Astyagyia.
- Hypseus, who fought on Phineus' side against Perseus, killed Prothoenor but was himself slain by Perseus.
- Hypseus, son of Asopus, who fought in the war of the Seven against Thebes. He killed a number of opponents, including Antiphōs, Astyages, Linus, and Tages, and was himself slain by Capaneus.
