= Isonoe =

In Greek mythology, Isonoe (Ancient Greek: Ἰσονόη, romanized: Isonóē), also called Isione (Ἰσιόνη) or Hesione, was one of the Danaïdes. She was a lover of Zeus and had a son with him, Orchomenos or Chryses. After her death, she was transformed by the god into a spring.
