= Eteocles (Boeotian king) =

In Greek mythology, Eteocles (/ɪˈtiːəkliːz/; Ancient Greek: Ἐτεοκλῆς, lit. 'true glory') was a king of Orchomenus. The local tradition concerning him is preserved in Pausanias' Description of Greece, and runs as follows.

== Family ==
Eteocles was the son of Andreus (himself son of the river-god Peneus) and Euippe, daughter of Leucon, and successor to his father's throne. Alternately, he was called son of the river god Cephissus (hence referred to by the patronymic Cephisiades in some poetical texts according to Pausanias). Eteocles was also called the father of Minyas.

== Mythology ==
He was credited with having founded two tribes (phylae), one of which received the name Cephisias after his possible father, and the other one was named after himself. He assigned a little of his land to Almus, son of Sisyphus, who was believed to have given his name to the village Olmonas ("Almones" was the alleged original form of its name). Eteocles was also said to have been the first to offer sacrifices to the Charites, and to have recognized three as the true number of the goddesses.

The mythological connection between Eteocles and the Charites is confirmed by the account of Theocritus, who refers to the Charites as "divine daughters of Eteocles". Strabo also credits Eteocles with founding the temple of the Charites, and mentions that Eteocles "was the first to display both wealth and power; for he honored these goddesses either because he was successful in receiving graces, or in giving them, or both."

In another account, surviving in the commentaries of Nicolaus Sophista, a Greek philosopher and rhetor of the fifth century AD, the three daughters of Eteocles fell into a deep well while singing and dancing in honour of the Graces and drowned. Gaia, in pity, transformed them all into tall and proud cypresses. The author notes that this is why colloquially the cypresses were also called graces.
