= Cyrene (mythology) =

Nymph, mother of Aristaeus by Apollo

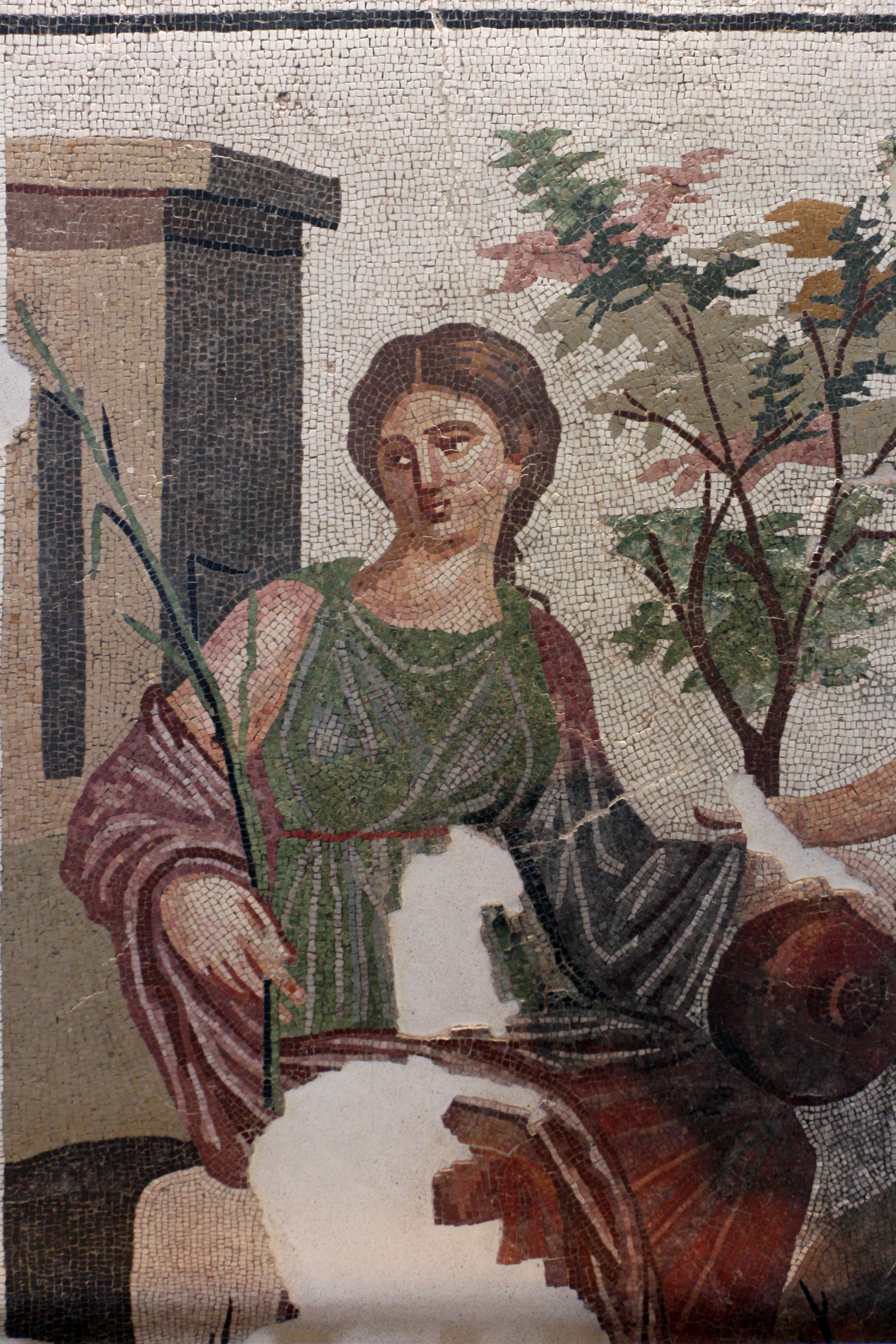
- Cyrene depicted on a mosaic of the 2nd century CE

Genealogy
- Parents: Chlidanope and Hypseus
- Consort: Apollo
- Offspring: Aristaeus, Autuchus and Idmon

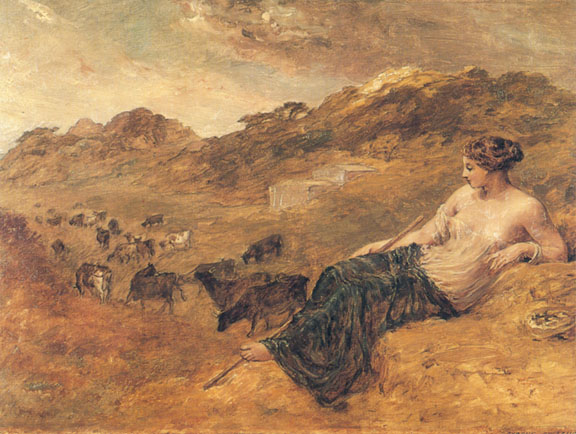
Cyrene and Cattle by Edward Calvert, 1830s or 1840s

In Greek mythology, Cyrene (/saɪˈriːni/, sy-REE-nee; Ancient Greek: Κυρήνη, lit. 'sovereign queen' or 'wall'), also spelled Kyrene, was the etymon of the Greek colony of Cyrene, Libya. She was said to have been a Thessalian princess and huntress who became the queen regnant of Cyrene, founded and named in her honor by the god Apollo. The story is entirely apocryphal, the city having been founded by settlers from Thera.

== Family ==
As recorded in Pindar's ninth Pythian ode, Cyrene was the daughter of Hypseus, king of the Lapiths, and the Naiad Chlidanope. According to scholia on Apollonius Rhodius, she also had a sister called Larissa. Cyrene's other sisters were Themisto, Alcaea and Astyagyia.

By the god Apollo, she bore Aristaeus and Idmon. Aristaeus became the god of animal husbandry, bee-keeping and cheese making. Idmon became a famed seer. Scholia on Apollonius Rhodius states that the couple also had another son called Autuchus.

== Mythology ==
=== Artemis and Apollo ===
Cyrene was a Thessalian princess, the daughter of Hypseus and the Naiad Chlidanope. She was a fierce huntress, called by Nonnus, a "deer-chasing second Artemis, the girl lionkiller" and "a champion in the leafy forest with lionslaying hands". In Thesmophoriazusae (written by Aristophanes) Mnesilochus comments that he "can't see a man there at all – only Cyrene" when setting eyes upon the poet Agathon who has dressed in women's clothing and accessorised himself with male and female attributes. She was a companion of goddess Artemis, who had given her two hunting dogs. With the help of these dogs, Cyrene had been able to win the prize in the funeral games of Pelias. Pindar describes her in his Pythian Ode:

And by Hypseus was reared this maid, Cyrene of the lovely arms. But she loved not the pacing tread this way and that beside the loom, nor the delights of merry feasts with her companions in the household. But the bronze-tipped javelin and the sword called her to combat and slay the wild animals of the field; and in truth many a day she gave of peaceful quiet to her father's livestock.

When a monstrous lion attacked the sheep of her father's kingdom, Cyrene wrestled with the lion and she killed it. Apollo, who was present, admired her bravery and skills. He fell in love with her, but wondered if it would be correct to make her his bride. But after consulting and getting an approval by Chiron, the centaur fostered by Apollo and Artemis, he carried her away to North Africa in his golden car. After Apollo made Cyrene the ruler of the fertile and rich land, Aphrodite welcomed them both.

And Aphrodite of the silver feet welcomed this guest from Delos, laying the touch of her light hand upon his god-built car, and over the sweet bliss of their bridal she spread love's shy and winsome modesty, plighting in joint wedlock the god and maiden daughter of wide-ruling Hypseus...That very day saw the decision, and in a chamber of rich gold in Libya they lay together. There she is guardian of a city rich in beauty.

Apollo founded the city Cyrene in the region of Cyrenaica, both named after his lover. The couple had two sons: Aristaeus, the god of beekeeping, and Idmon, the Argonaut seer. Another son, Autuchus, is also mentioned by Apollonius of Rhodes. Aristaeus was entrusted to Chiron, and Idmon was brought up and educated by Apollo. After Cyrene gave birth to their children, Apollo transformed her into a nymph so that she could have a long life and keep hunting with Artemis as much as she desired. He often helped by lifting their hunting nets.In another account Cyrene's sons by Apollo were Nomius, Aristaeus, Authocus, and Argaeus.

==== Other versions ====
In Callimachus and Acesander's account, when Eurypylus was still ruling Libya, a monstrous lion had terrorized the citizens greatly, so Apollo brought Cyrene to get rid of the lion. After she killed the lion on the Myrtoussa (the Hill of Myrtles), Apollo stood on the same hill and showed to her the land of Libya, which she had now become the queen of.

Other version says that Cyrene had already wrestled with a lion and killed that same lion and she was tending her sheep along the marsh-meadow of the river Pineios when Apollo carried her away.

=== Aristaeus ===
Aristaeus pursued Eurydice, the wife of Orpheus, but she rejected his unwanted advances. She died when she was bitten by a snake that she had trod upon during her escape. As a consequence of her death, all of his bees died. Desolate, he went to his mother and bemoaned his situation. Cyrene consoled her son and instructed him to seek the advice of the wise Proteus, a prophetic sea god. Aristaeus followed his mother's instructions and Proteus told him how to appease Eurydice's soul and recover his bees.
