= Pallantium (Arcadia) =

Town of Arcadia

Coordinates: 37°27′09″N 22°19′44″E

Pallantium or Pallantion (Ancient Greek: Παλλάντιον), more rarely Palantium or Palantion (Παλάντιον), was one of the most ancient towns of Arcadia, in the district Maenalia, said to have been founded by Pallas, a son of Lycaon. It was situated west of Tegea, in a small plain called the Pallantic plain (Παλλαντικόν πεδίον) which was separated from the territory of Tegea by a dyke. It was from this town that Evander of Pallene was said to have led colonists to the banks of the river Tiber, and from it the Palatino or Palatine Hill in Rome was reputed to have derived its name.

Pallantium took part in the foundation of Megalopolis, 371 BCE; but it seems to have continued to exist as an independent state, since the Pallantieis is mentioned along with the Tegeatae, Megalopolitae, and Aseatae as joining Epaminondas before the Battle of Mantineia in 362 BCE. Pallantium subsequently shrank into a village, but was restored and enlarged by the Roman emperor Antoninus Pius, who conferred upon it freedom from taxation and other privileges, on account of its reputed connection with Rome. The town was visited by the geographer Pausanias, who found at Pallantium a shrine containing statues of Pallas and Evander, a temple of Core (Persephone), a statue of Polybius, and on the hill above the town, which was anciently used as an acropolis, a temple of the pure (καθαροί) gods.

Its site is located near the modern Palantio (formerly Berbati), which was renamed to reflect association with the ancient town. From 1939 to 1940, the archaeological site was discovered and excavated by the Italian Archaeological School of Athens (Guido Libertini, but especially Alfonso De Franciscis). It was then excavated again between 1984 and 1986 (including two years for studying all the finds from both excavations) under a collaboration of the Norwegian Institut at Athens with the Italian School (Erik Østby and Mario Iozzo).
