= Palamedes (mythology) =

Euboean prince and son of Nauplius

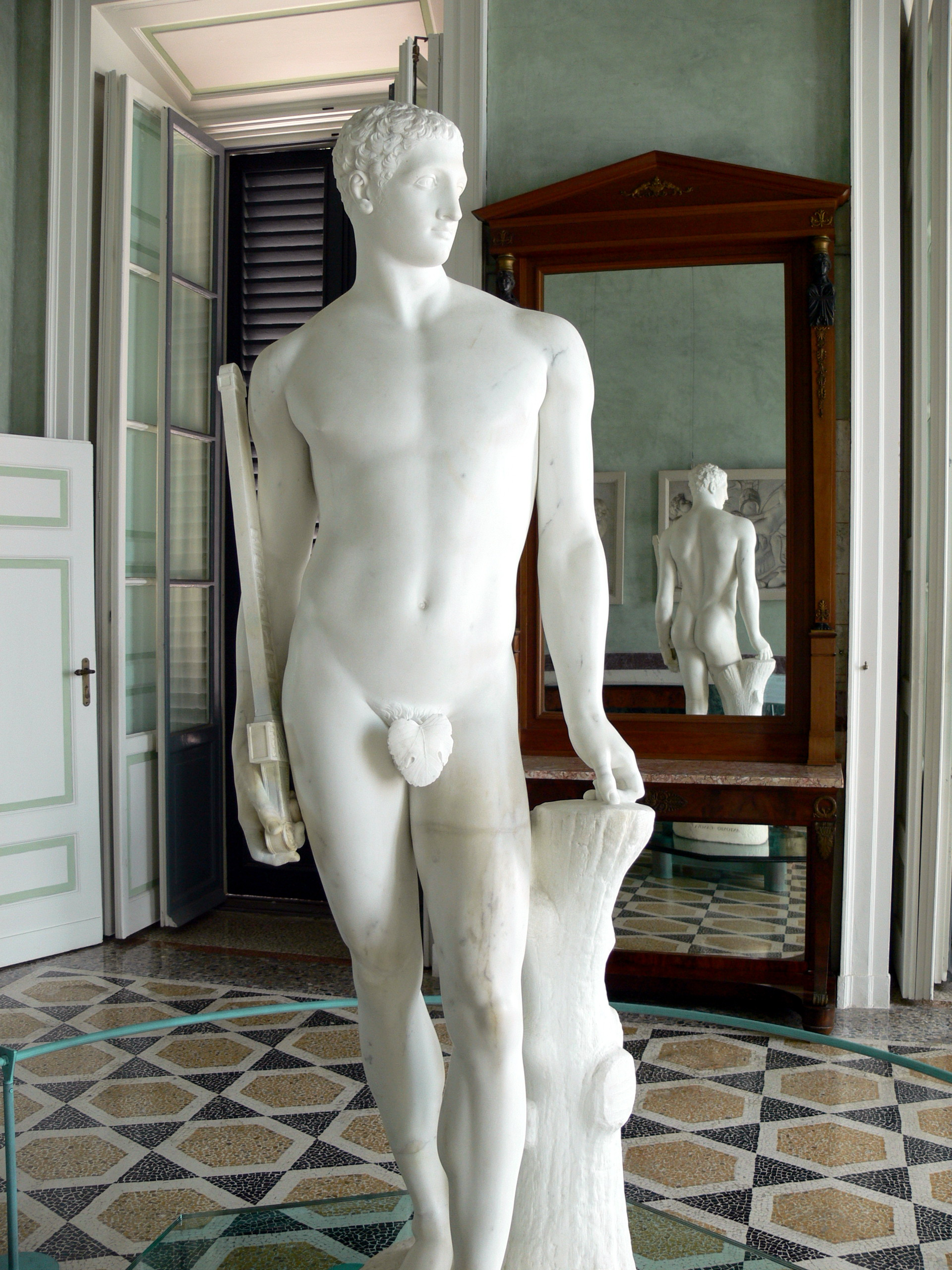
Sculpture of Palamedes by Antonio Canova

Palamedes (Ancient Greek: Παλαμήδης, romanized: Palamḗdēs, lit. 'the handy' or 'contriving one'; pronounced /ˌpæl.əˈmiː.diːz/, pal-uh-MEE-deez) was a Euboean prince, son of King Nauplius in Greek mythology. He joined the rest of the Greeks in the expedition against Troy. He was associated with the invention of dice, numbers, and letters.

== Family ==
Palamedes's mother was either Clymene (daughter of King Catreus of Crete), Hesione, or Philyra. He was the brother of Oeax and Nausimedon.

== Mythology ==
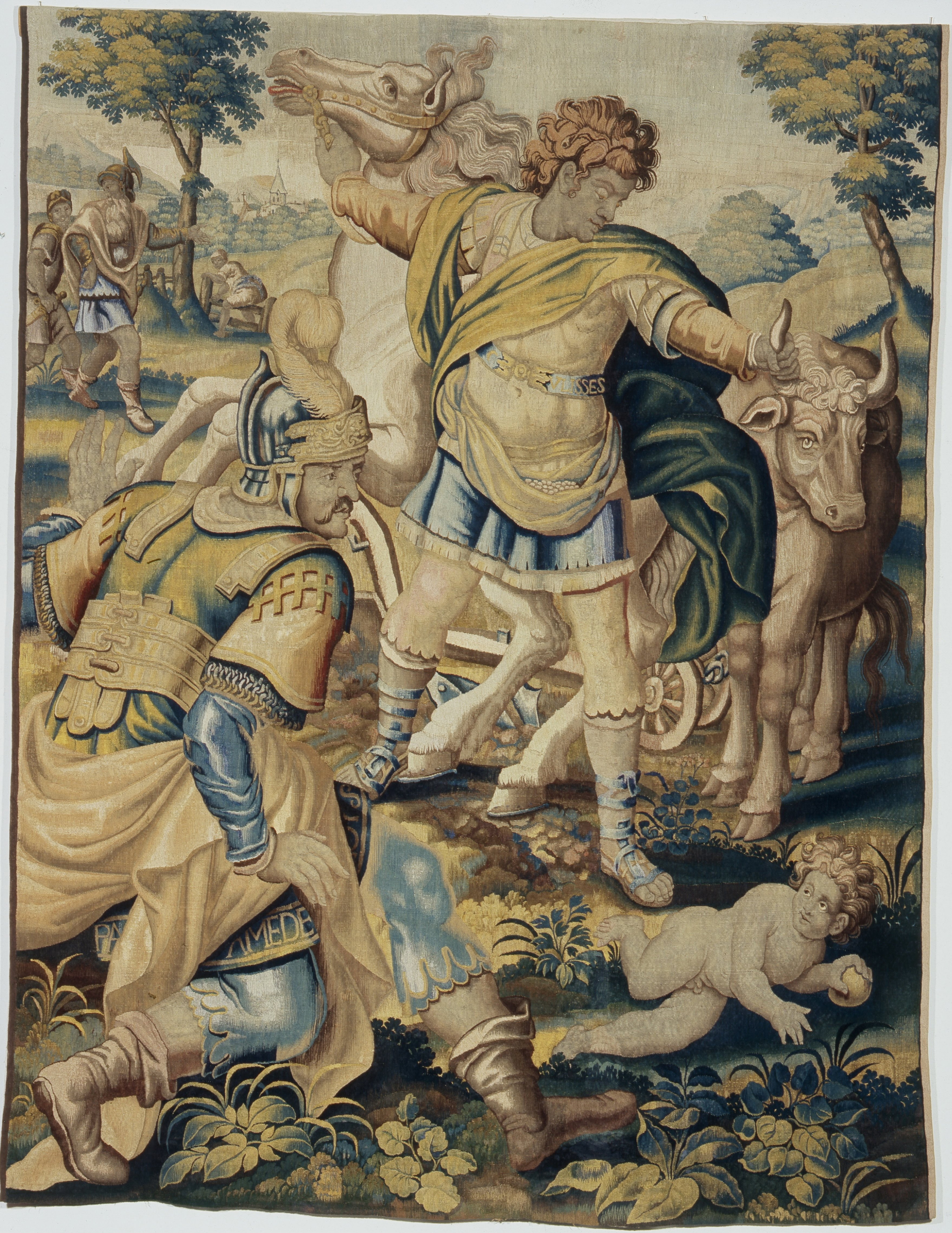
Odysseus fakes insanity, early 17th century tapestry. Ptuj Ormož Regional Museum, Ptuj Slovenia

Although he is a major character in some accounts of the Trojan War, Palamedes is not mentioned in Homer's Iliad. According to Dares, he brought thirty ships from Cormos to Troy, while according to Philostratus, he came to Troy alone with his brother, Oeax, on a ferryboat.

After Paris took Helen to Troy, Agamemnon sent heralds to each of the kings, to remind them of the oaths which they had sworn to protect Menelaus' marriage, and warned them to look to the safety each of his own wife, saying that the affront had been offered equally to the whole of Greece. In some versions, like Hyginus's Fabulae, Agamemnon and Menelaus traveled personally to Ithaca to retrieve Odysseus. Since he did not wish to go to war, he feigned madness by plowing his fields with a donkey and an ox both hitched to the same plow, so the beasts of different sizes caused the plow to pull chaotically. Palamedes, on his own initiative and realizing the deception, placed Odysseus’ infant son Telemachus, in front of the plow, forcing Odysseus to reveal his sanity. This episode served as an example of Palamedes' cleverness and ingenuity, as well as establishing his intellectual rivalry with Odysseus.

According to Philostratus, he participated in the Achaean attack on Teuthrania. Together with Diomedes and Sthenelus, he fought with Haimos, a son of Ares, and killed him. Protesilaus praised Palamedes for his valor, but Palamedes awarded the glory to Diomedes. He also accompanied Achilles in his campaigns around Troy. During one battle around Abydus, Achilles was wounded and forced to retreat, but Palamedes stood his ground and conquered the city.

The ancient sources give different accounts of how Palamedes met his death. By Hyginus's account, Odysseus never forgave Palamedes for ruining his attempt to stay out of the Trojan War. When Palamedes advised the Greeks to return home, Odysseus hid gold in his tent and wrote a fake letter purportedly from Priam. Thus Palamedes was accused of treason and stoned to death by the Greeks. In Pausanias's version, Palamedes was drowned by Odysseus and Diomedes during a fishing expedition. Still another version by Dictys Cretensis relates that he was lured into a well in search of treasure, and then was crushed by stones.

In a wildly different account, Palamedes, instead of being murdered, convinces the Greeks to select him as leader of the expedition over Agamemnon. He enjoys a short success on the battlefield, killing Deiphobus and Sarpedon, but is quickly shot in the neck and killed by Paris. This version, written in Latin, purportedly by Dares Phrygius, became popular amongst the many Trojan War retellings of Medieval Western Europe.

== In ancient literature ==
In the Apology, Plato describes Socrates as looking forward to speaking with Palamedes after death, and intimates in the Phaedrus that Palamedes authored a work on rhetoric. Euripides and many other dramatists wrote dramas about his fate. The orator Gorgias also wrote a Defense of Palamedes, describing the defense speech that Palamedes gave when charged with treason.

Ovid discusses Palamedes' role in the Trojan War in the Metamorphoses. Palamedes' fate is described in Virgil's Aeneid.

Dares the Phrygian portrayed Palamedes as ". . .tall and slender, wise, magnanimous, and charming."

=== Inventions ===
Palamedes is variously credited with the invention of various aspects of counting and writing.

Plato in The Republic (Book 7) remarks (through the character of Socrates) that Palamedes claimed to have invented numbers. Pausanias in his Description of Greece (2.20.3) says that in Argos there is a Temple of Fortune to which Palamedes dedicated the dice that he had invented. Hyginus claims Palamedes created eleven letters of the Greek alphabet:

The Fates, Clotho, Lachesis, and Atropo, created seven Greek letters: Α Β Η Τ Ι Υ. Others say that Mercury did it from the flight of cranes which make the shape of letters when they fly. However, Palamedes the son of Nauplius invented 11 letters.

== Reception ==
In 1625 the major Dutch playwright Joost van den Vondel wrote the play Palamedes, based on the Greek myth. The play had a clear topical political connotation: the unjust killing of Palamedes stands for the execution of the statesman Johan van Oldenbarnevelt six years earlier, which Vondel, like others in the Dutch Republic, considered a judicial murder. In Vondel's version, responsibility for Palamedes' killing is attributed mainly to a harsh and tyrannical Agamemnon, who was clearly intended to represent Prince Maurits of Nassau. Authorities in Amsterdam found no difficulty in deciphering the political meanings behind Vondel's classical allusions and imposed a heavy fine on him.
