= Peneus =

Thessalian river god

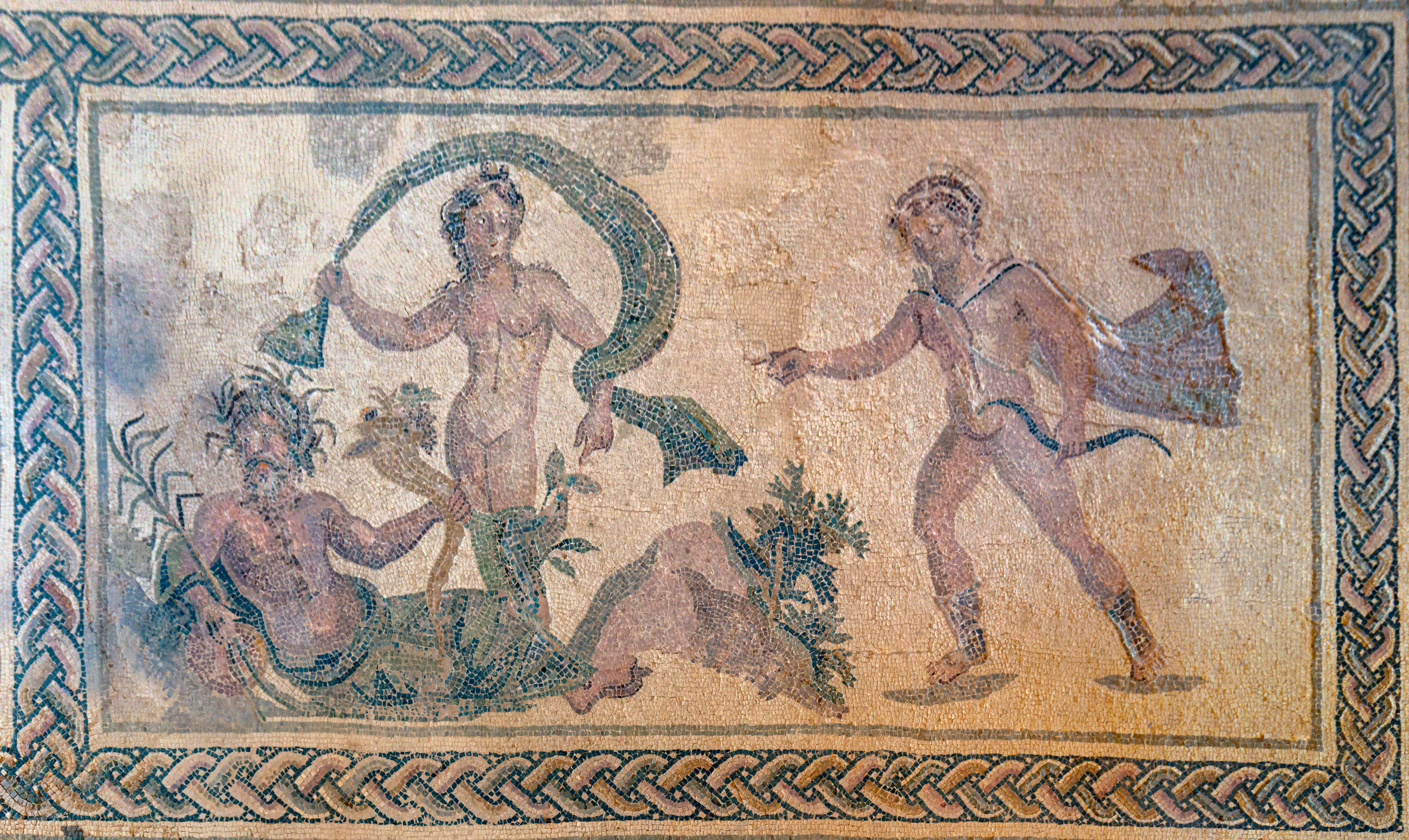
Peneus with Apollo and Daphne on a 2nd- or 3rd-century Roman mosaic from the Paphos Archaeological Park in Cyprus. (Note: The identification of the river-god as Peneus, while accepted by many scholars, has also been contested.)

In Greek mythology, Peneus (/pəˈniːəs/; Ancient Greek: Πηνειός, romanized: Pēneiós) is a Thessalian river god, one of the three thousand Rivers, a child of Oceanus and Tethys.

== Family ==
The nymph Creusa bore him one son, Hypseus, who was King of the Lapiths, and three daughters, Menippe (mother of Phrastor by Pelasgus), Daphne and Stilbe. Some sources state that he was the father of Cyrene, alternately known as his granddaughter through Hypseus. Daphne, in an Arcadian version of the myth, was instead the daughter of the river god Ladon.

Peneus also had a son Atrax with Bura, and Andreus with an unknown consort. Tricce (or Tricca), eponym of the city Tricca, was mentioned as his daughter. In later accounts, Peneus was credited to be the father of Chrysogenia who consorted with Zeus and became the mother of Thissaeus. Meanwhile, his daughter Astabe coupled with Hermes and became the parents of Astacus, father of Iocles, father of Hipponous. According to Hellanicus, Peneus was the father of Iphis, mother of Salmoneus by Aeolus the son of Hellen. In Pherecydes' account, he also sired Dryops to Polydora, daughter of Danaus.

== Mythology ==
Eros shot Apollo with one of his arrows, causing him to fall in love with Daphne. It was Eros's plan that Daphne would scorn Apollo because Eros was angry that Apollo had made fun of his archery skills. Eros also claimed to be irritated by Apollo's singing. Daphne prayed to the river god Peneus to help her. He changed her into a laurel tree, which later became sacred to Apollo (see Apollo and Daphne).

== Gallery ==
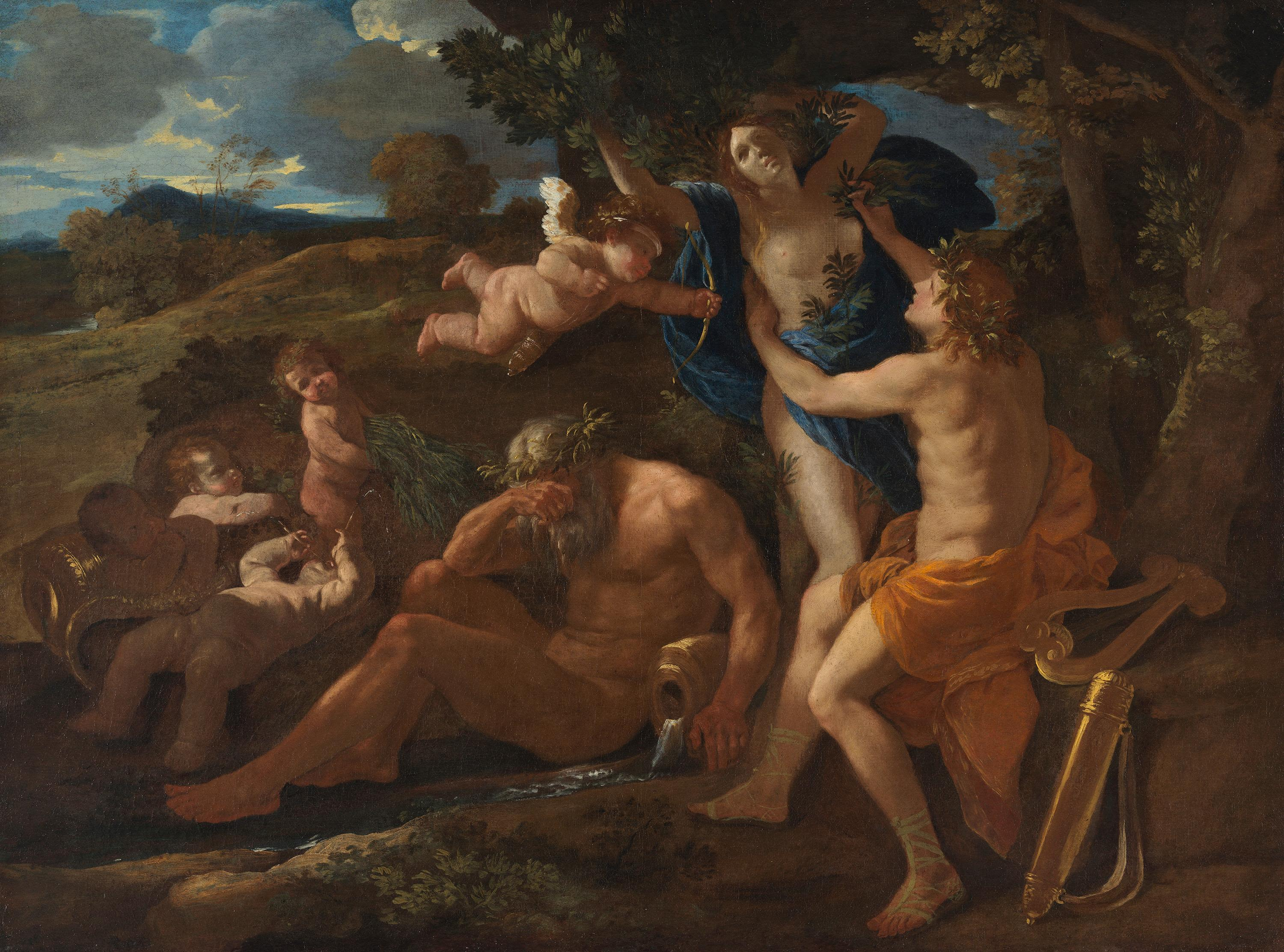
Peneus averts his gaze as Apollo, pierced by Cupid's arrow of desire, pursues Daphne, transforming into the laurel (Apollo and Daphne, 1625, by Poussin)

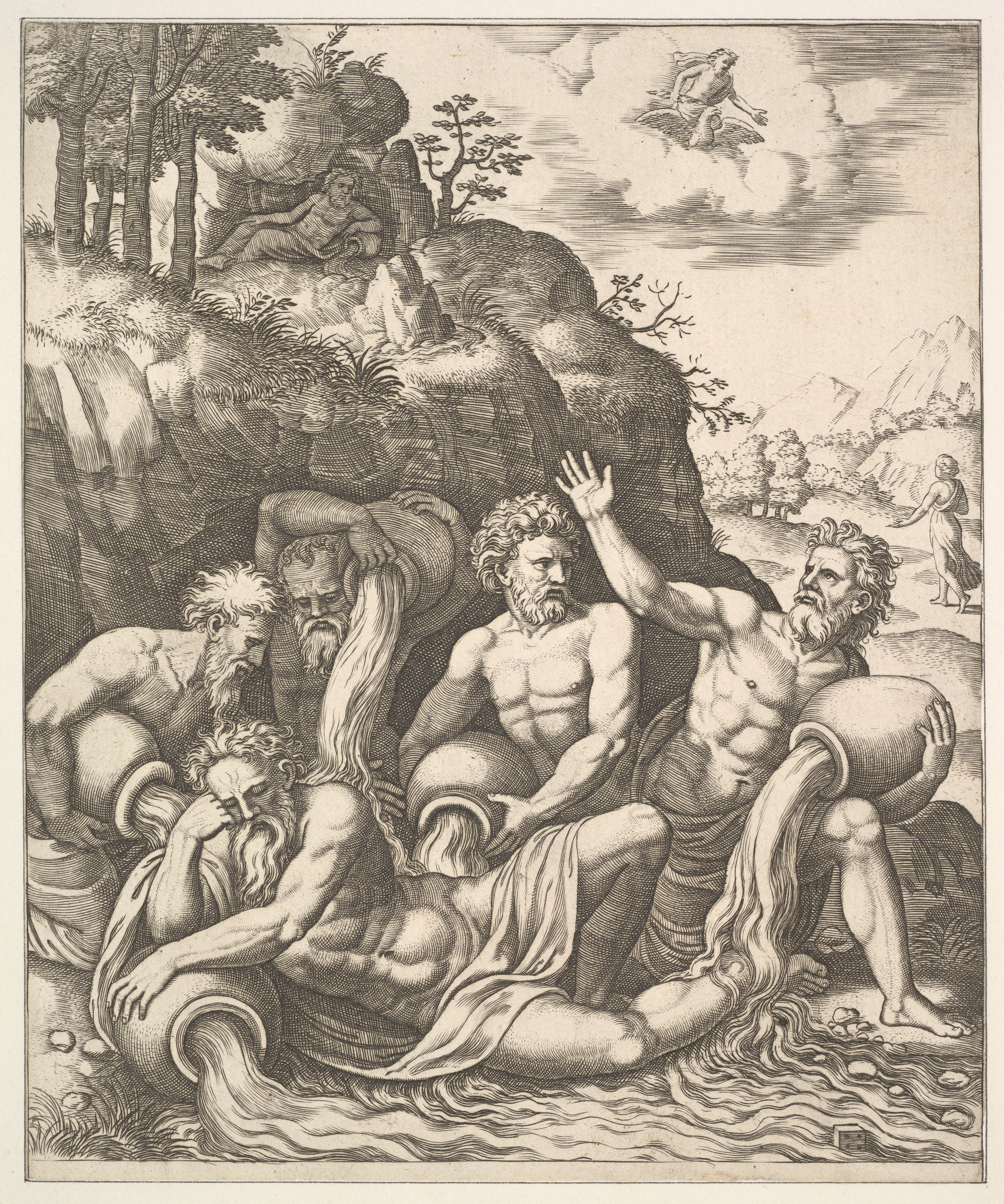
River gods consoling Peneus for the Loss of his Daughter, Daphne

== Bibliography ==
- Daszewski, Wiktor; Michaelides, Demetres (1988). Guide to the Paphos Mosaics. Bank of Cyprus Cultural Foundation. ISBN 9963-42-010-9.
- Diodorus Siculus, The Library of History translated by Charles Henry Oldfather. Twelve volumes. Loeb Classical Library. Cambridge, Massachusetts: Harvard University Press; London: William Heinemann, Ltd. 1989. Vol. 3. Books 4.59–8. Online version at Bill Thayer's Web Site; Greek text available at the Perseus Digital Library.
- Dionysius of Halicarnassus, Roman Antiquities. English translation by Earnest Cary in the Loeb Classical Library, 7 volumes. Harvard University Press, 1937–1950. Online version at Bill Thayer's Web Site; Greek text available at the Perseus Digital Library.
- Hesiod, The Theogony from The Homeric Hymns and Homerica with an English Translation by Hugh G. Evelyn-White, Cambridge, MA., Harvard University Press; London, William Heinemann Ltd. 1914. Online version at the Perseus Digital Library. Greek text available from the same website.
- Hyginus, Fabulae from The Myths of Hyginus translated and edited by Mary Grant. University of Kansas Publications in Humanistic Studies. Online version at the Topos Text Project.
- Kondoleon, Christine (1994). Domestic and Divine: Roman Mosaics in the House of Dionysos. Cornell University Press. ISBN 0-8014-3058-5.
- Nonnus, Dionysiaca translated by William Henry Denham Rouse (1863-1950), from the Loeb Classical Library, Cambridge, MA, Harvard University Press, 1940. Online version at the Topos Text Project; Greek text available at the Perseus Digital Library.
- Ovid, Metamorphoses translated by Brookes More (1859-1942). Boston, Cornhill Publishing Co. 1922. Online version at the Perseus Digital Library; Latin text available at the Perseus Digital Library.
- Pausanias, Description of Greece with an English Translation by W.H.S. Jones, Litt.D., and H.A. Ormerod, M.A., in 4 Volumes. Cambridge, MA, Harvard University Press; London, William Heinemann Ltd. 1918. ISBN 0-674-99328-4. Online version at the Perseus Digital Library; Greek text available at the Perseus Digital Library.
- Pindar, Odes translated by Diane Arnson Svarlien. 1990. Online version at the Perseus Digital Library.; Greek text available at the Perseus Digital Library.
- Pseudo-Clement, Recognitions from Ante-Nicene Library Volume 8, translated by Smith, Rev. Thomas. T. & T. Clark, Edinburgh. 1867. Online version at theoi.com.
- Statius, The Thebaid translated by John Henry Mozley. Loeb Classical Library Volumes. Cambridge, MA, Harvard University Press; London, William Heinemann Ltd. 1928. Online version at the Topos Text Project; Latin text available at the Perseus Digital Library.
- Stephanus of Byzantium, Stephani Byzantii Ethnicorum quae supersunt, edited by August Meineike (1790-1870), published 1849. A few entries from this important ancient handbook of place names have been translated by Brady Kiesling. Online version at the Topos Text Project.
- Virgil, Bucolics, Aeneid, and Georgics of Vergil. J. B. Greenough. Boston. Ginn & Co. 1900. Online version at the Perseus Digital Library.
