= Cercops =

Pythagorean philosopher, orphic poet

Cercops (Ancient Greek: Κέρκωψ) was a poet to whom Orphic writings were attributed. He was called a Pythagorean by Clement of Alexandria who also states that Epigenes of Alexandria said that he was the author of an Orphic epic poem entitled the "Descent to Hades" and ἱερός λόγος (English "Holy Discourse"), which seem to have been extant in the Alexandrian period. Others attribute the latter work to Prodicus of Samos, or Herodicus of Perinthus, or Orpheus of Camarina. According to Cicero, the Pythagoreans ascribe the Orphic poem to a certain Cercops. According to Aristotle, Cercops could not have been a Pythagorean, as the poet was a contemporary of Hesiod.
