= Eurymedon (mythology) =

Jovian deity

In Greek mythology, Eurymedon (Ancient Greek: Εὐρυμέδων, romanized: Eurymedōn, lit. 'ruling far and wide') was the name of several minor figures:

- Eurymedon, a Titan or Giant who fathered Prometheus by raping Hera when she was young and still living with her parents. After Zeus married her and learned of this, he threw Eurymedon into Tartarus.
- Eurymedon, king of the Gigantes, father of Periboea (mother of Nausithous by Poseidon). He brought destruction on his people and was himself destroyed.
- Eurymedon, one of the Cabiri, children of Hephaestus and Cabiro, a Thracian woman. He was the brother of Alcon. Eurymedon fought in the Indian War of Dionysus but he fled when attacked by Orontes.
- Eurymedon, possible father of Cinyras by the nymph Paphia.
- Eurymedon, one of the four sons of Minos and his concubine Pareia. His brothers were Nephalion, Chryses and Philolaus. Eurymedon was a resident of the island of Paros in the Cyclades but was slain by the hero Heracles.
- Eurymedon, son of Dionysus and Ariadne, one of the Argonauts. He was the brother of Phlias.
- Eurymedon, father of Andromache who was one of the sacrificial victims of the Minotaur.
- Eurymedon, father of Leanida who consorted with Zeus and became the mother of Coron.
- Eurymedon, defender of the Hypsistan gate at Thebes during the military campaign of the Seven against Thebes. He is the son of Faunus(Pan).
- Eurymedon, not a servant but a squire to and charioteer of Agamemnon. He was the son of Ptolemy (Ptolemaeus), son of Peiraeus. Pausanias mentioned that Eurymedon's tomb was in the underground chambers at Mycenae along with Agamemnon himself; indicating that he was a loyal squire of importance to his master. He is mentioned once in The Iliad, Book 4, Line 228.
- Eurymedon, servant of Nestor, not to be confused with Agamemnon's squire. He is mentioned only twice in the Iliad, Books 8 and 11, Lines 114 and 620, respectively.
- Eurymedon, a surname of Poseidon, Perseus and Hermes.
