= Erginus (king of Orchomenus) =

King

In Greek mythology, Erginus /ˈɜːrdʒɪnəs/ (Ancient Greek: Ἐργῖνος) was a king of Minyan Orchomenus in Boeotia.

== Family ==
Erginus was the son of Clymenus or Periclymenus, his predecessor, and Buzyge (or Budeia) and his brothers were Arrhon, Azeus, Pyleus, Stratius, Eurydice and Axia. In one account, his father was instead Azeus. Some authors identify him with another Erginus, a Milesian Argonaut.

== Mythology ==
Erginus avenged his father's death at the hands of Perieres, charioteer of Menoeceus of Thebes; he made war against Thebans, inflicting a heavy defeat. The Thebans were compelled to pay King Erginus a tribute of 100 oxen per year for twenty years. However, the tribute ended earlier than Erginus expected, when Heracles attacked the Minyan emissaries sent to exact the tribute. This prompted a second war between Orchomenus and Thebes, only this time Thebes (under the leadership of Heracles) was victorious, and a double tribute was imposed on the Orchomenians. Erginus was slain in battle according to the version of the story given by most ancient writers (e.g., the Bibliotheca, Strabo, Eustathius). But according to Pausanias, Erginus was spared by Heracles and lived to a ripe old age, and even fathered two sons, Trophonius and Agamedes, on a younger woman.
