= Periphas =

Multiple figures in Greek mythology

Periphas (/ˈpɛrɪfəs/; Ancient Greek: Περίφᾱς, gen. Περίφαντος, romanized: Períphās, lit. 'conspicuousness') in Greek mythology may refer to:

- Periphas, a legendary king of Attica who Zeus turned into an eagle, husband of Phene.
- Periphas, an Egyptian prince as one of the sons of King Aegyptus. His mother was Gorgo and thus full brother of Oeneus, Aegyptus, Menalces, Lampus and Idmon. In some accounts, his mother could either be Eurryroe, daughter of the river-god Nilus, or Isaia, daughter of King Agenor of Tyre. Periphas suffered the same fate as his other brothers, save Lynceus, when they were slain on their wedding night by their wives who obeyed the command of their father King Danaus of Libya. He married the Danaid Actaea, daughter of Danaus and Pieria.
- Periphas, one of the five sons of Aretus who fought against Dionysus in the Indian War.
- Periphas, a Aetolian prince as son of King Oeneus of Calydon and Althaea, daughter of King Thestius of Pleuron. He was the brother of Meleager, Phereus, Ageleus, Toxeus, Clymenus, Gorge, Eurymede, Deianira and Melanippe.
- Periphas, a son of Lapithes and Orsinome in Thessaly. He consorted with Astyagyia, daughter of Hypseus, and had by her eight sons, of whom the eldest, Antion was a possible father of Ixion with Perimela.
- Periphas, one of the Lapiths at the wedding of Pirithous and Hippodamia. He must not be confused with the above-mentioned Periphas who was also a Lapith.
- Periphas, same as Hyperphas.
- Periphas, son of the Aetolian Ochesius, fell by the hand of Ares in the Trojan War. As his body was being looted, Diomedes wounded Ares in the stomach and forced him to retreat. According to Nicander's Aetolica, Ochesius was the son of Oeneus, making Periphas a cousin to Diomedes.
- Periphas, a companion of Neoptolemus who took part in the destruction of Troy.
- Periphas, one of the sons of King Aeolus of Lipara, the keeper of the winds. He had five brothers namely: Agenor, Euchenor, Klymenos, Xouthos and Macareus, and six sisters: Klymene, Kallithyia, Eurygone, Lysidike, Kanake and an unnamed one. According to various accounts, Aeolus yoked in marriage his sons, including Periphas, and daughters in order to preserve concord and affection among them.
- Periphas, one of the Suitors of Penelope who came from Zacynthus along with other 43 wooers. He, with the other suitors, was shot dead by Odysseus with the aid of Eumaeus, Philoetius, and Telemachus.
- Periphas, a son of Epytus, and a herald of Aeneas.
