= Minyan (disambiguation) =

Minyan in Judaism, is a quorum of ten men required for prayer.

Minyan may mean:

- Minyan (film), 2020 American LGBT-related coming-of-age drama film
- Minyans, in Greek mythology and pre-history, an early population group in the Aegean area
- Minyan ware, in archaeology, a style of pottery possibly associated with the Minyans, from the Middle Helladic period
- Minyans (Doctor Who), a fictional alien species in the Doctor Who television serial Underworld
