= Amphidocus =

In Greek mythology, Amphidocus (Ancient Greek: Ἀμφίδοκος) was a son of Orchomenus of Minyan Orchomenus. He was the brother of Clymenus and Aspledon, eponymous founder of Spledon.

== Reference ==
- Stephanus of Byzantium, Stephani Byzantii Ethnicorum quae supersunt, edited by August Meineike (1790-1870), published 1849. A few entries from this important ancient handbook of place names have been translated by Brady Kiesling. Online version at the Topos Text Project.
