= Caskey =

Caskey is a surname. Notable people with the surname include:

- Alex Caskey (born 1988), American soccer player
- Billy Caskey (born 1954), Northern Ireland footballer
- C. Thomas Caskey, American physician and geneticist
- Craig Caskey (born 1949), American baseball player
- Darren Caskey (born 1974), English footballer
- Elizabeth Caskey (1910–1994), Classical scholar
- John Caskey (1908–1981), American archaeologist and classical scholar
- Lafayette Caskey (1824–1881), American politician and carpenter
- Caskey (rapper), American rapper
