= Chersias =

Ancient Greek epic poet

Chersias (Ancient Greek: Χερσίας) of Orchomenus (fl. late 7th century BCE) was an archaic Greek epic poet whose work is all but lost today. Plutarch presents Chersias as an interlocutor in the Banquet of the Seven Sages, making him a contemporary of Periander and Chilon. Chersias is also said to have been present when Periander's father Cypselus dedicated a treasury at Delphi. According to Pausanias, Chersias' poetry had already fallen out of circulation by his day, but the geographer quotes the only extant fragment of his epic poetry, citing a speech delivered by Callippus of Corinth (5th century BCE) to the Orchomenians as the source:

ἐκ δὲ Ποσειδάωνος ἀγακλειτῆς τε Μιδείης
Ἀσπληδὼν γένεθ' υἱὸς ἀν' εὐρύχορον πτολίεθρον.

From Poseidon and much-famed Mideia
Aspledon was born, a son in the wide-wayed city.

This fragment suggests that Chersias, like his apparent contemporary Asius of Samos, composed in the genre of genealogical epic best represented today by the fragmentary Hesiodic Catalogue of Women. Pausanias goes on to relate that Chersias composed the epitaph which the Orchomenians inscribed upon the base of a statue they erected in Hesiod's honor:

Ἄσκρη μὲν πατρὶς πολυλήιος· ἀλλὰ θανόντος
ὀστέα πληξίππων γῆ Μινύων κατέχει
Ἡσιόδου, τοῦ πλεῖστον ἐν ἀνθρώποις κλέος ἐστὶν
ἀνδρῶν κρινομένων ἐν βασάνῳ σοφίης.

Ascra rich in wheat was his fatherland, but in death
the land of the horsedriving Minyans holds the bones
of Hesiod, whose fame is greatest among humans
when men are judged by the touchstone of art.

== Bibliography ==
- Robert, C. (1877), "De Gratiis Atticis", Commentationes philologiae in honorem Th. Mommseni scripserunt amici, Berlin.
- West, M.L. (2003), Greek Epic Fragments, Loeb Classical Library, vol. 497, Cambridge, MA, ISBN 978-0-674-99605-2. (Greek text with facing English translation)
