= Axia (mythology) =

Minyan princess in Greek mythology

In Greek mythology, Axia (Ancient Greek: Ἀξίας) was a Minyan princess, the daughter of King Clymenus of Orchomenus and Budeia, daughter of Lycus. She was the sister of Erginus, Stration, Arrhon, Pyleus, Azeus and Eurydice, wife of Nestor of Pylos. A town in Ozolian Locris was named after her.
