= Aeolus =

Group of characters in Greek mythology

In Greek mythology, Aiolos, transcribed as Aeolus (/ˈiːələs/; Ancient Greek: Αἴολος [ǎi̯.olos]; Modern Greek: Αίολος [ˈe.olos]) refers to three characters. These three are often difficult to tell apart, and even the ancient mythographers appear to have been perplexed about which Aeolus was which. Diodorus Siculus made an attempt to define each of these three (although it is clear that he also became muddled), and his opinion is followed here.

- The first Aeolus was a son of Hellen and the eponymous founder of the Aeolian race.
- The second Aeolus was a son of Poseidon, who led a colony to islands in the Tyrrhenian Sea.
- The third Aeolus was a son of Hippotes who is mentioned in the Odyssey and the Aeneid as the ruler of the winds.

All three men named Aeolus appear to be connected genealogically, although the precise relationship, especially regarding the second and third Aeolus, is often ambiguous as their identities seem to have been merged by many ancient writers.

Aeolus was also the name of the following minor characters:

- Aeolus, a defender of Thebes in the war of the Seven against Thebes. He was killed by Parthenopaeus.
- Aeolus, a Trojan companion of Aeneas in Italy, where he was killed by Turnus, King of the Rutulians. Aeolus was the father of Clytius and Misenus.

== See also ==
- Aeolia (mythical island), island kingdom of Aeolus, ruler of the winds
- ADM-Aeolus, a satellite mission by ESA for measuring wind profiles from space
