= Xuthus (mythology) =

In Greek mythology, Xuthus (/ˈz(j)uːθəs/; Ancient Greek: Ξοῦθος, romanized: Xoûthos) may refer to the following characters:

- Xuthus, son of Hellen and father of Ion by Creusa.
- Xuthus, one of the sons of King Aeolus of Aeolian Islands, the keeper of the winds. His mother was named as either Cyane, daughter of Liparus or Telepora (Telepatra), daughter of Laestrygon. Xuthus's siblings were variously given as (1) Agathyrnus, Astyochus, Androcles, Iocastus and Pheraemon; (2) Androcles, Chrysippus, Jocastus, Phalacrus, Pheraemon, Aeole, Astycrateia, Dia, Hephaestia, Iphthe and Periboea; and lastly, (3) Periphas, Agenor, Euchenor, Klymenos, Macareus, Klymene, Kallithyia, Eurygone, Lysidike, Kanake and an unnamed sister. According to various accounts, Aeolus yoked in marriage his sons, including Xuthus, and daughters in order to preserve concord and affection among them. Later on, Xuthus became king of the land in the neighbourhood of Leontini, which is known after him as Xuthia to this day.
