= Aspledon (mythology) =

Ancient Greek male name

In Greek mythology, Aspledon (Ancient Greek: Ἀσπληδών, romanized: Asplēdṓn) was regarded as the founder of Aspledon, an ancient town of the Minyans in Boeotia. He was the son of either 1) Poseidon and the nymph Midea; 2) Presbon and Sterope; and 3) Orchomenus and a brother of Clymenus and Amphidocus.
