= Arrhon =

Name from Greek mythology

In Greek mythology, Arrhon (Ancient Greek: Ἄρρων) may refer to the two different figures:

- Arrhon, a Minyan prince as the son of King Clymenus (Periclymenus) of Orchomenus and Buzyge (or Budeia) and his brothers were Erginus, Azeus, Pyleus, Stratius, Eurydice and Axia. Together with his brothers, they attacked Thebes and, being victorious, imposed on the city a tribute to be paid each year for the murder of their father Clymenus.
- Arrhon, an Arcadian king as the son of Erymanthus, a descendant of King Lycaon of Arcadia. He was the father of Psophis, one of the possible eponyms for the city of Psophis.
