= Perieres =

In Greek mythology, Perieres (Ancient Greek: Περιήρης) may refer to these two distinct individuals.

- Perieres, king of Messenia and son of Aeolus.
- Perieres, Theban charioteer of Menoeceus (father of Creon). He was the one who wounded Clymenus, king of Minyans and father of Erginus. This resulted to the heavy tribute imposed by the Minyans to the Thebans.
