= Azeus =

Minyan prince in Greek mythology

In Greek mythology, Azeus (pronounced /ˈæ.zi.əs/ or /ˈæ.ˈziːəs/; Ancient Greek: Ἀζεύς), also Aezeius (Ancient Greek: Ἀζειός), was a Minyan prince as the youngest among the sons of King Clymenus of Orchomenus.

== Family ==
Azeus mother was probably Boudeia, daughter of Lycus. He was the brother of Erginus, Stratius, Arrhon, Pyleus, Eurydice and Axia. Azeus was the father of King Actor, father of Astyoche who coupled with Ares and begat Ascalaphus and Ialmenus, the Orchomenian leaders during the Trojan War.

== Mythology ==
Azeus went with his brothers, under the command of Erginus against Thebes, to take vengeance for the murder of his father, who had been slain by the Thebans at a festival of the Onchestian Poseidon.
