= Lysidice (mythology) =

Lysidice or Lysidike (Ancient Greek: Λυσιδίκη) is the name of several women in Greek mythology.

- Lysidice, daughter of Pelops and Hippodamia. She married Mestor and became the mother of Hippothoe. She was also sometimes said to be the mother of Alcmene, by Electryon.
- Lysidice, a Thespian princess as one of the 50 daughters of King Thespius and Megamede or by one of his many wives. When Heracles hunted and ultimately slayed the Cithaeronian lion, Lysidice with her other sisters, except for one, all laid with the hero in a night, a week or for 50 days as what their father strongly desired it to be. Lysidice bore Heracles a son, Teles.
- Lysidice, daughter of Coronus, mother of Philaeus by Ajax the Great.
- Lysidice of Athens, one of the would-be sacrificial victims of Minotaur.
- Lysidice, wife of Borus and mother of Penthilus.
- Lysidice, one of the daughters of King Aeolus of Lipara, the keeper of the winds. She had six brothers namely: Periphas, Agenor, Euchenor, Klymenos, Xouthos, Macareus, and five sisters: Klymene, Kallithyia, Eurygone, Kanake and an unnamed one. According to various accounts, Aeolus yoked in marriage his sons and daughters, including Lysidike, in order to preserve concord and affection among them.
