= Budeia =

In Greek mythology, the name Budeia or Budea /bjuːˈdiːə/ (Ancient Greek: Βούδεια Boúdeia, "oxen-yoker") may refer to:

- Budeia, a surname of Athena in Thessaly.
- Budeia, daughter of Lycus. She was the wife of the Orchomenian king, Clymenus and mother of his children, including Erginus, Stration, Arrhon, Pyleus, Azeus, Eurydice and Axia. The Boeotian town of Budeion was named after her or alternatively attributed it to the Argive hero Budeion. An alternate spelling of her name is Buzyge (Βουζύγη Bouzyge same meaning as Boudeia)
