= Callithyia =

In Greek mythology, Callithyia or Kallithyia (/ˌkælɪˈθaɪ.ə/; Ancient Greek: Καλλίθυια) may refer to two different women:

- Callithyia, daughter of Peiras and mother of Trochilus.
- Callithyia, one of the daughters of King Aeolus of Lipara, the keeper of the winds. She had six brothers namely: Periphas, Agenor, Euchenor, Klymenos, Xouthos, Macareus, and five sisters: Klymene, Eurygone, Lysidike, Kanake and an unnamed one. According to various accounts, Aeolus yoked in marriage his sons and daughters, including Kallithyia, in order to preserve concord and affection among them.
