= Eurygone =

In Greek mythology, Eurygone (Ancient Greek: Εύρυγόνη) was one of the daughters of King Aeolus of Lipara, the keeper of the winds. She had six brothers namely: Periphas, Agenor, Euchenor, Klymenos, Xouthos, Macareus, and five sisters: Klymene, Kallithyia, Lysidike, Kanake and an unnamed one. According to various accounts, Aeolus yoked in marriage his sons and daughters, including Eurygone, in order to preserve concord and affection among them.
