= Aethra (mother of Theseus) =

Ancient Greek royal figure

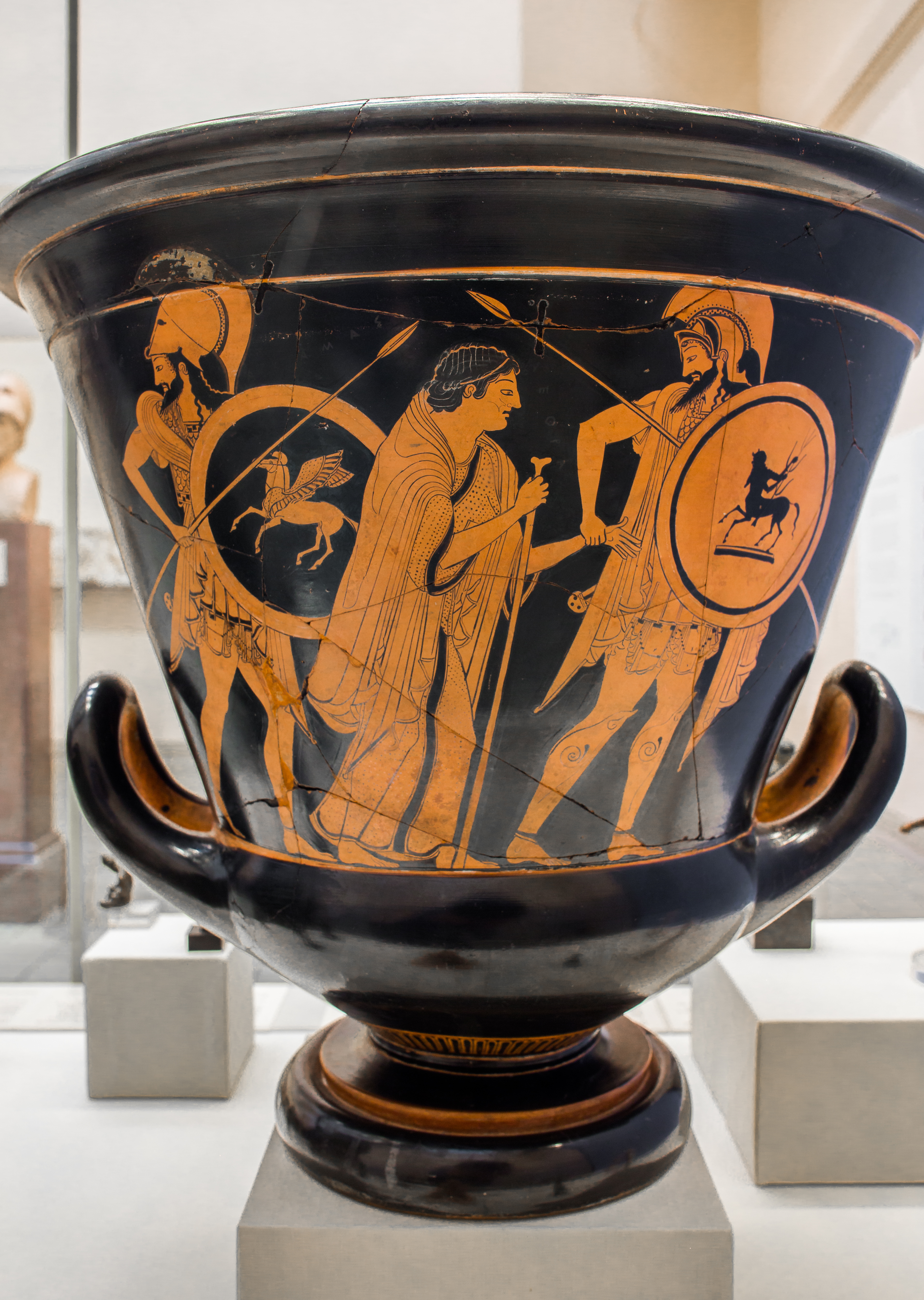
Acamas and Demophon leading Aethra, red-figure calyx-krater circa 490 BC.

In Greek mythology, Aethra or Aithra (Ancient Greek: Αἴθρα, romanized: Aíthra, lit. 'bright sky', pronounced [ǎi̯tʰra], /ˈɛ.θra/, EH-thra or AY-thruh, English: /ˈiːθrə/, EE-thruh) was a Troezenian princess and the daughter of King Pittheus.

== Family ==
Aethra was the mother of Theseus (his father was King Aegeus of Athens, or in some versions, Poseidon) and of Clymene (by Hippalces). Aethra was also called Pittheis after her father Pittheus.

== Mythology ==
=== Early life ===
Bellerophon came to Troezen to ask Aethra's father, Pittheus, for the maiden's hand in marriage, but the hero was banished from Corinth before the nuptials took place.

King Aegeus who was childless with his previous marriages went to Troezen, a city southwest of Athens that had as its patrons Athena and Poseidon. Here Pittheus got Aegeus drunk on unmixed wine and put him to bed with his daughter. Following the instructions of Athena in a dream, she left the sleeping Aegeus and waded across to the island of Sphairia that lay close to Troezen's shore. There she poured a libation to Sphairos, Pelops' charioteer, and laid with Poseidon in the night. Aethra was therefore impregnated by both Aegeus and Poseidon in the process. According to Plutarch, her father spread this report merely that Theseus might be regarded as the son of Poseidon, who was much revered at Troezen.

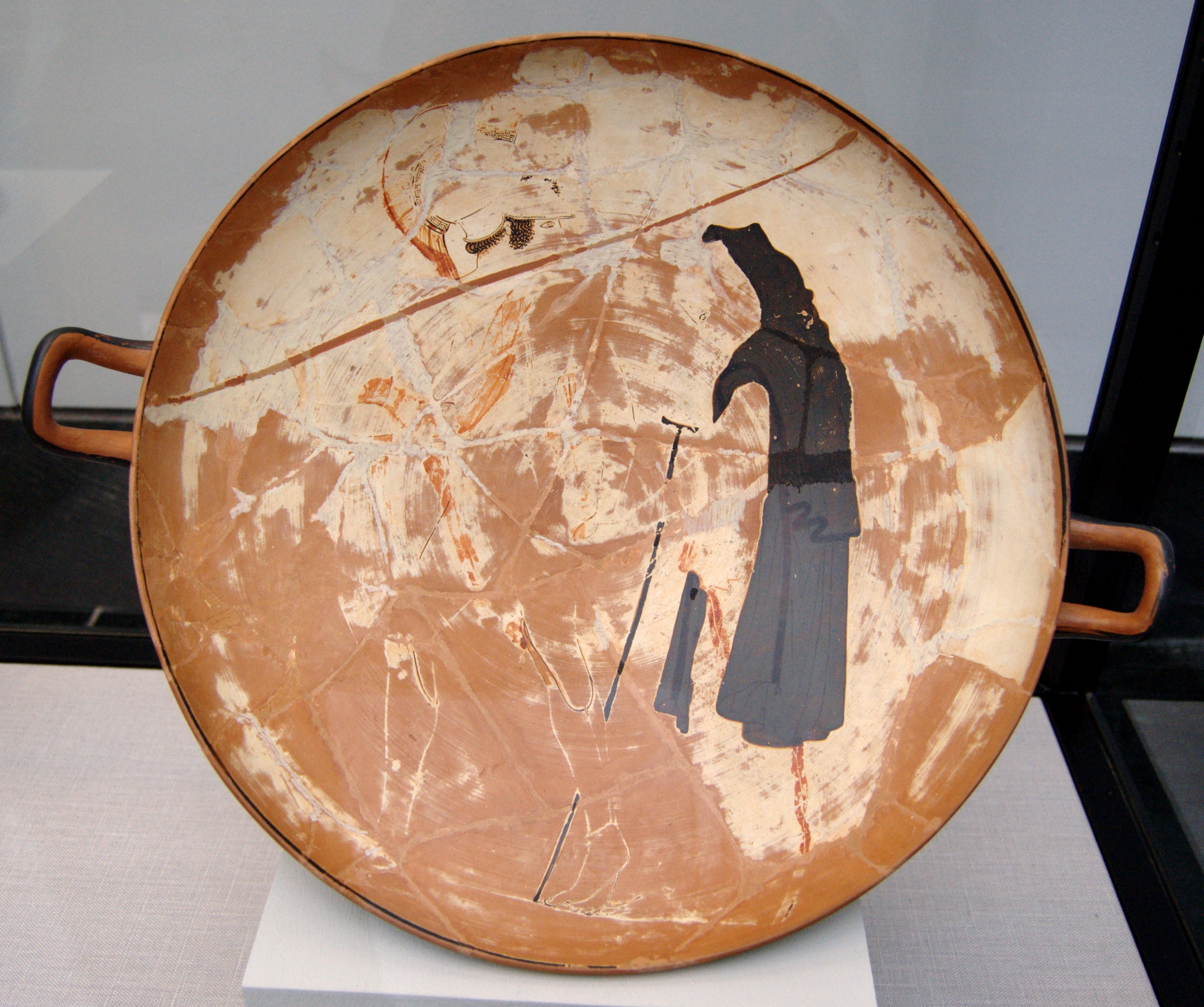
Demophon (?) freeing Aethra, Attic white-ground kylix, 470–460 BC, Staatliche Antikensammlungen.

Aethra, later on dedicated in the island of Sphairia a temple to Athena Apaturia (the Deceitful), and called the island Hiera instead of Sphaeria, and also introduced among the maidens of Troezen the custom of dedicating their girdles to Athena Apaturia on the day of their marriage. At a later time, when Aethra was thus doubly pregnant, Aegeus decided to go back to Athens. Before leaving, he covered his sandals, shield and sword under a huge rock, that served as a primitive altar to Strong Zeus, and told her that when their son would grow up, he should move the rock and bring his weapons back. Aethra did as she was told, and Theseus, recovering the weapons that were his birthright, grew to be a great hero, killing the Minotaur, among other adventures.

=== Enslavement and Death ===
Later, when Theseus kidnapped Helen, he gave her to Aethra for safekeeping. Helen's brothers, the Dioscuri, took Helen back and kidnapped Aethra to Lacedaemon in revenge. There she became a slave of Helen with whom she went to Troy and remained there until found by her grandson, Acamas. In some accounts, she helped facilitate the seduction of Helen by Paris. At the taking of Troy, she came to the camp of the Greeks, where she was recognised by her grandsons, and Demophon, one of them, asked Agamemnon to procure her liberation. Agamemnon accordingly sent a messenger to Helen to request her to give up Aethra. This was granted, and Aethra became free again. According to Hyginus, she afterwards put an end to her own life from grief at the death of her sons. The history of her bondage to Helen was represented on the celebrated chest of Cypselus, and in a painting by Polygnotus in the Lesche of Delphi.

== Gallery ==
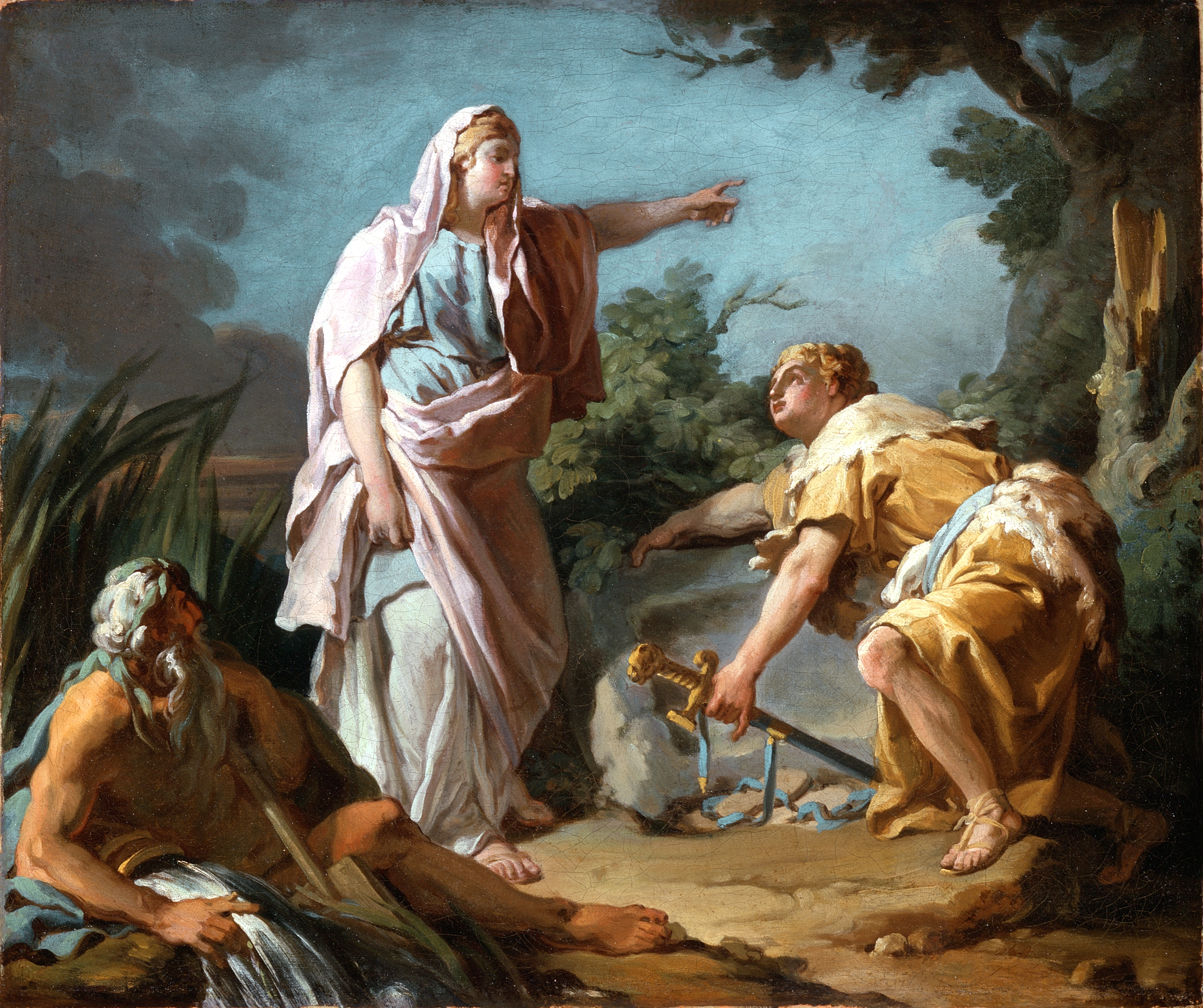
Aethra Showing her Son Theseus the Place Where his Father had Hidden his Arms by Nicolas-Guy Brenet (1768)

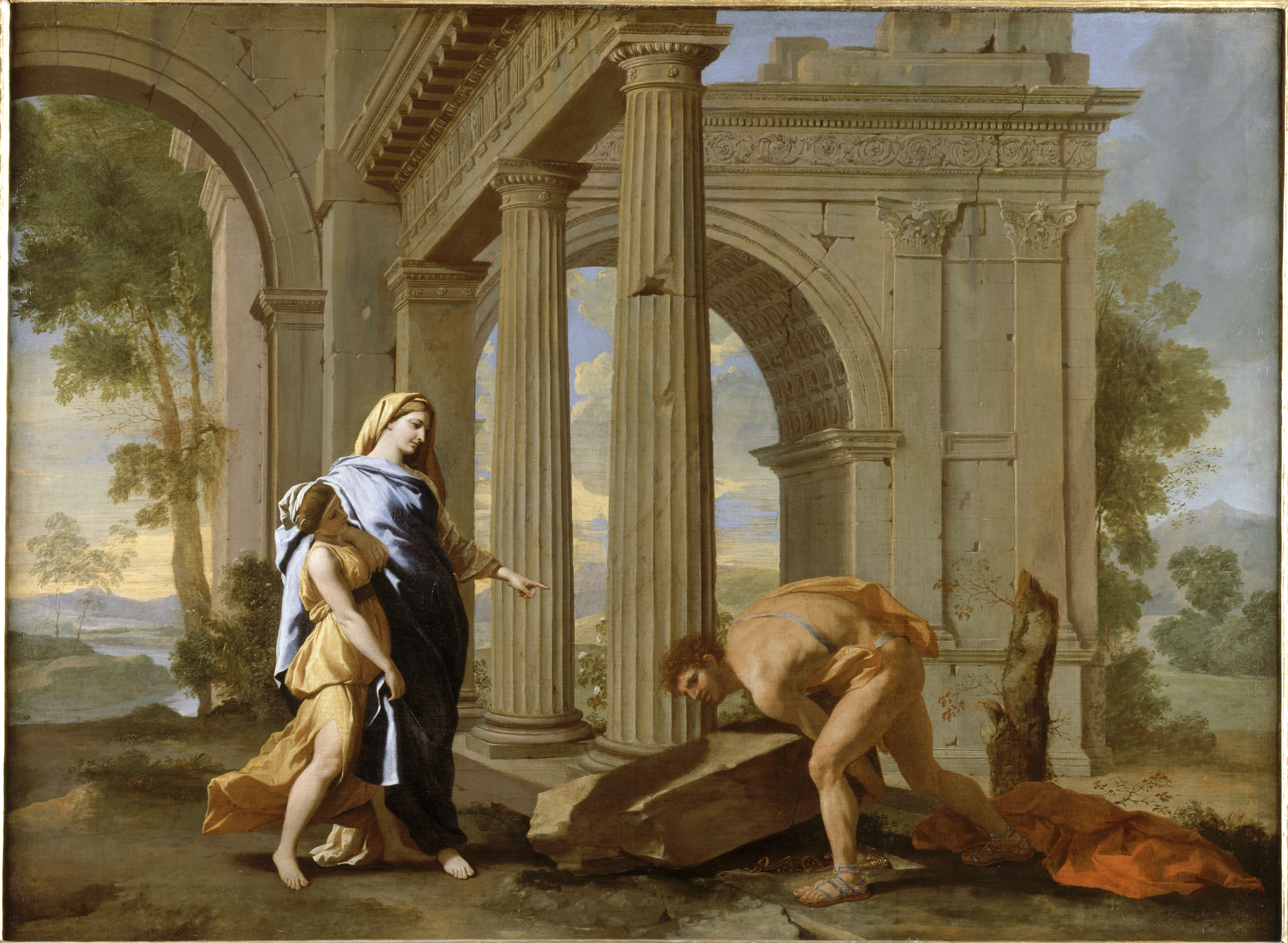
Thésée retrouve l'épée de son père by Nicolas Poussin & Jean Lemaire (circa 1638)

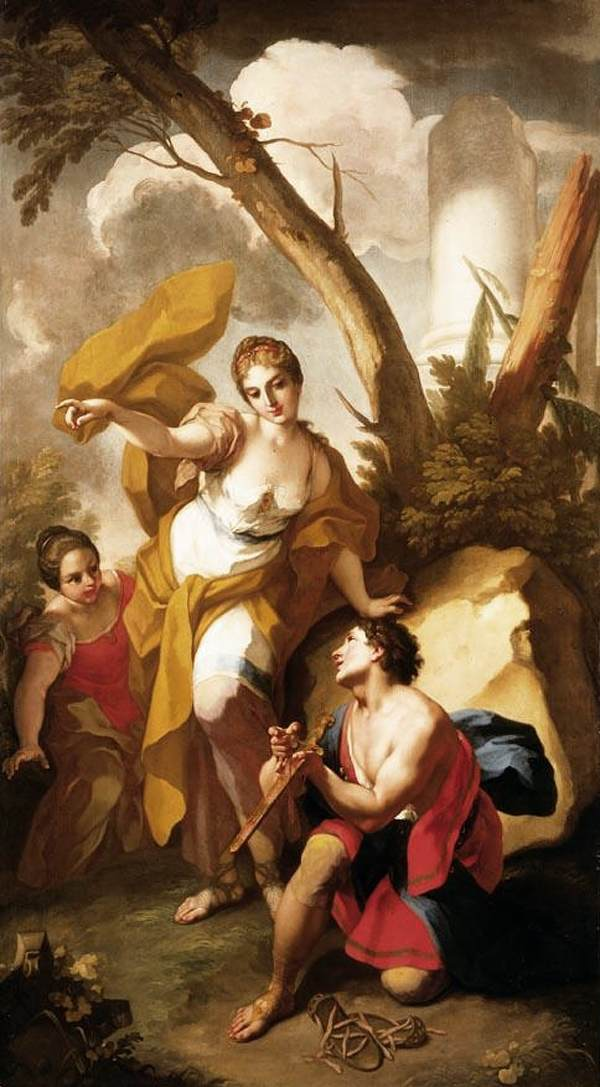
Theseus Discovering his Father's Sword by Antonio Balestra (1st half of 18th century)

== In popular culture ==
With significant alterations to the character, a version of this Aethra appears (as "Aithra"), a sorceress and concubine of Poseidon, in Richard Strauss's famous opera Die ägyptische Helena (The Egyptian Helen).
