= Clymene (mythology) =

Name of several figures in Greek mythology

In Greek mythology, the name Clymene or Klymene (Ancient Greek: Κλυμένη, romanized: Kluménē, lit. 'fame'; feminine form of Κλύμενος; pronounced /ˈklɪmɪniː/, /ˈklaɪ-/, KLIM-uh-nee or KLY-muh-nee) may refer to:

- Clymene, the wife of the Titan Iapetus, was one of the 3,000 Oceanids, the daughters of the Titans Oceanus and his sister-spouse Tethys. She was the mother of Atlas, Epimetheus, Prometheus, and Menoetius; other authors relate the same of her sister Asia. A less common genealogy makes Clymene the mother of Deucalion by Prometheus. She may also be the Clymene referred to as the mother of Mnemosyne by Zeus. In some myths, Clymene was one of the nymphs in the train of Cyrene.
- Clymene, another Oceanid, was given as the wife to King Merops of Aethiopia and was, by Helios, the mother of Phaethon and the Heliades.

Others include:

- Clymene, the name of one or two Nereid(s), 50 sea-nymph daughters of the 'Old Man of the Sea' Nereus and the Oceanid Doris. Clymene and her other sisters appeared to Thetis when she cries out in sympathy for the grief of Achilles for his slain comrade Patroclus.
- Clymene, an Amazon.
- Clymene, an "ox-eyed" servant of Helen of Troy. She was a daughter of Aethra by Hippalces, thus half-sister to Theseus and a distant relative to Menelaus. Clymene and her mother were taken by Helen to Troy as handmaidens when Helen eloped with Paris. Later, she was among the captives during the Trojan War along with Aethra, Creusa, Aristomache, and Xenodice. After the taking of Troy, when war booty was distributed, Clymene was given to Acamas. Meanwhile, some accounts relate that she and her mother were released by Acamas and Demophon after the fall of Troy.
- Clymene, a Cretan princess as the daughter of King Catreus, son of Minos. She and her sister Aerope were given to Nauplius to be sold away, as Catreus feared the possibility of being killed by one of his children. Nauplius took Clymene to wife, and by him she became mother of Palamedes, Oeax, and Nausimedon. In some accounts, the possible mother of these children was either Hesione or Philyra.
- Clymene, an Orchomenian princess as the daughter of King Minyas or of a certain Iphis. She was the wife of either Cephalus or Phylacus, and mother of Iphiclus and Alcimede. Some sources call her Periclymene or Eteoclymene, while according to others, Periclymene and Eteoclymene were instead the names of her sisters. Alternately, this Clymene was the wife of Iasus and mother by him of Atalanta. She was one of the souls encountered by Odysseus in his journey to the underworld.
- Clymene, possible mother of Myrtilus by Hermes.
- Clymene, a nymph, mother of Tlesimenes or Promachus by Parthenopaeus.
- Clymene, wife of the fisherman Dictys from Seriphos, honored together in Athens as the saviors of Perseus and had an altar dedicated to them when he and his mother Danaë were cast into the sea.
- Clymene, one of the daughters of King Aeolus of Lipara, the keeper of the winds. She had six brothers: Periphas, Agenor, Euchenor, Klymenos, Xouthos, and Macareus; and five sisters: Kallithyia, Eurygone, Lysidike, Kanake, and an unnamed one. According to various accounts, Aeolus yoked in marriage his sons and daughters, including Clymene, in order to preserve concord and affection among them.

== Legacy ==
- 356217 Clymene, Jupiter trojan (asteroid), named after the daughter of Catreus, wife of Nauplius and mother of Palamedes.
- 104 Klymene, Themistian asteroid
