= Erginus (Argonaut) =

Ancient Greek mythological figure

In Greek mythology, Erginus (/ˈɜːrdʒɪnəs/; Ancient Greek: Ἐργῖνος, romanized: Ergînos) was an Argonaut who piloted the Argo after the helmsman Tiphys died.

== Family ==
Erginus is said to be the son of Poseidon, and to have resided in the Carian city of Miletus. Yet others suggested he was a son of Periclymenus. Some authors identify him with another Erginus, king of Minyan Orchomenus.

== Mythology ==
During the funeral games which Hypsipyle celebrated at Lemnos in honour of her father Thoas, Erginus also contended for a prize. But he was ridiculed by the Lemnian women because of his grey hair, even though he was still young. However, Erginus defeated Boreads in the foot-race.
