= Hippalces =

In Greek mythology, Hippalces was the father of the "ox-eyed" Clymene by Aethra, daughter of Pittheus. These women were handmaidens of Helen at Troy.
