= Minyan ware =

Aegean burnished pottery

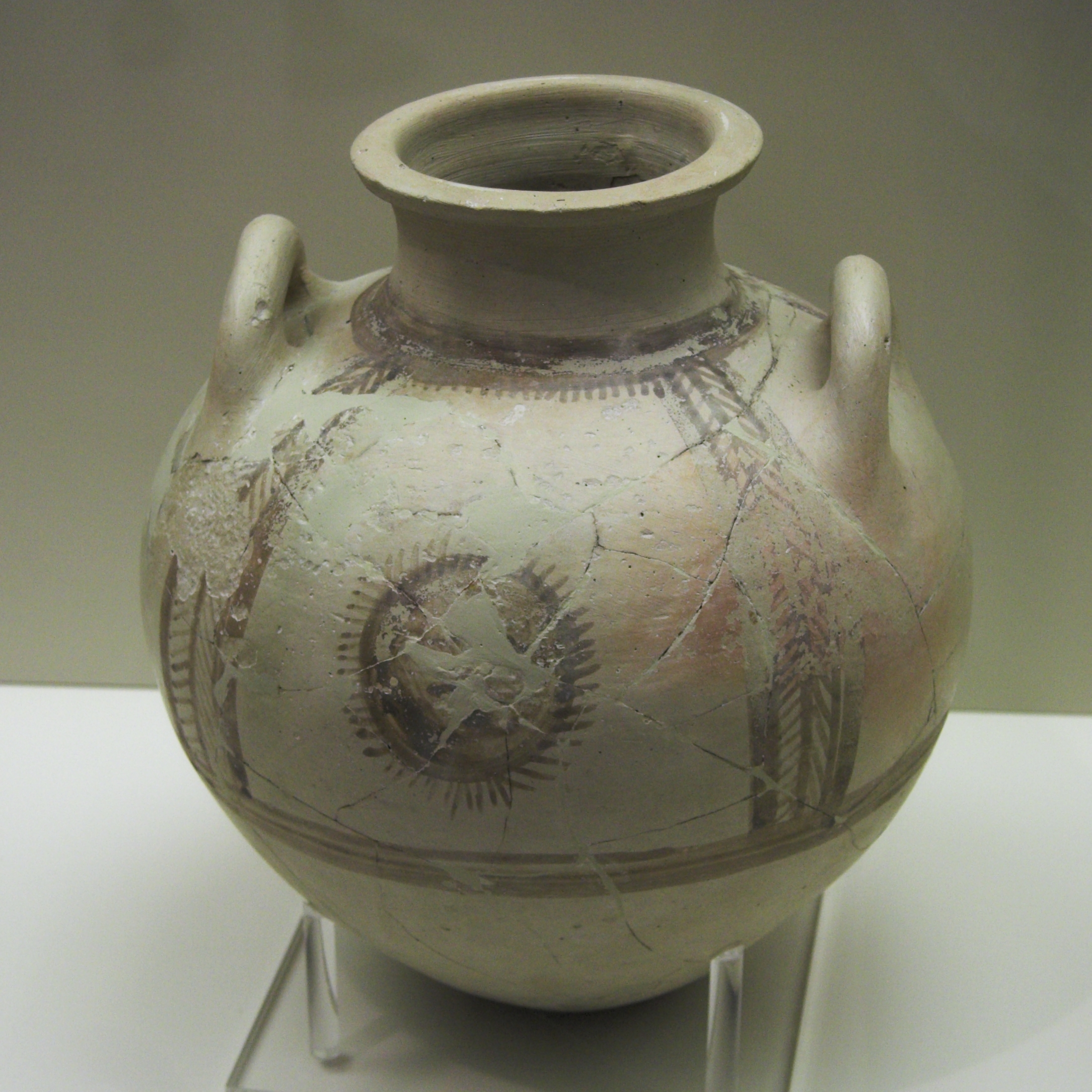
Minyan amphora from Mycenae, Middle Helladic III period, 1700–1600 BC.

Minyan ware is a broad archaeological term describing varieties of a particular style of Aegean burnished pottery associated with the Middle Helladic period (c. 2000/1900–1550 BC). The term was coined in the 19th century by German archaeologist Heinrich Schliemann after discovering the pottery in Orchomenos, Greece. Excavations conducted during the 1960s confirmed that Minyan ware evolved from the burnished pottery developed by the Tiryns culture of the Early Helladic III period (c. 2200/2150–2000/1900 BC).

== Term ==
In the history of Aegean prehistoric archaeology, Heinrich Schliemann was the first person to coin the term "Minyan" after he discovered a distinct variety of dark-burnished pottery at Orchomenos (the mythical home of King Minyas). Some of his contemporaries referred to the pottery as "Orchomenos Ware". However, the term "Minyan Ware" ultimately prevailed since it romantically recalled the glorious (though tenuous) Minyans of Greek mythology.

== Origins ==
At first, Alan Wace and Carl Blegen did not yet associate Minyan Ware with the "advent of the Greeks". Both archaeologists regarded the sudden appearance of Minyan Ware as one of two interruptions in the unbroken evolution of Greek pottery from the Neolithic up until the Mycenean era. Ultimately, they concluded that "Minyan Ware indicates the introduction of a new cultural strain."

Prior to 1960, Minyan Ware was often associated with northern invaders having destroyed Early Helladic culture (1900 BC) and introducing Middle Helladic culture into the Greek peninsula. However, John L. Caskey conducted excavations in Greece (i.e. Lerna) and definitively stated that Minyan Ware was in fact the direct descendant of the fine gray burnished pottery of Early Helladic III Tiryns culture. Caskey also found that the Black or Argive variety of Minyan Ware was an evolved version of the Early Helladic III "Dark slipped and burnished" pottery class. Therefore, Minyan Ware was present in Greece since between 2200 and 2150 BC. There is nothing particularly "northern" regarding the ceramic progenitors of Minyan Ware. The exception, however, entails the spread of Minyan Ware from central Greece to northeastern Peloponnese, which can be seen as "coming from the north" with respect to the Peloponnese. Currently, there is uncertainty as to how Minyan Ware arrived in central Greece or how it was indigenously developed.

== Forms and styles ==
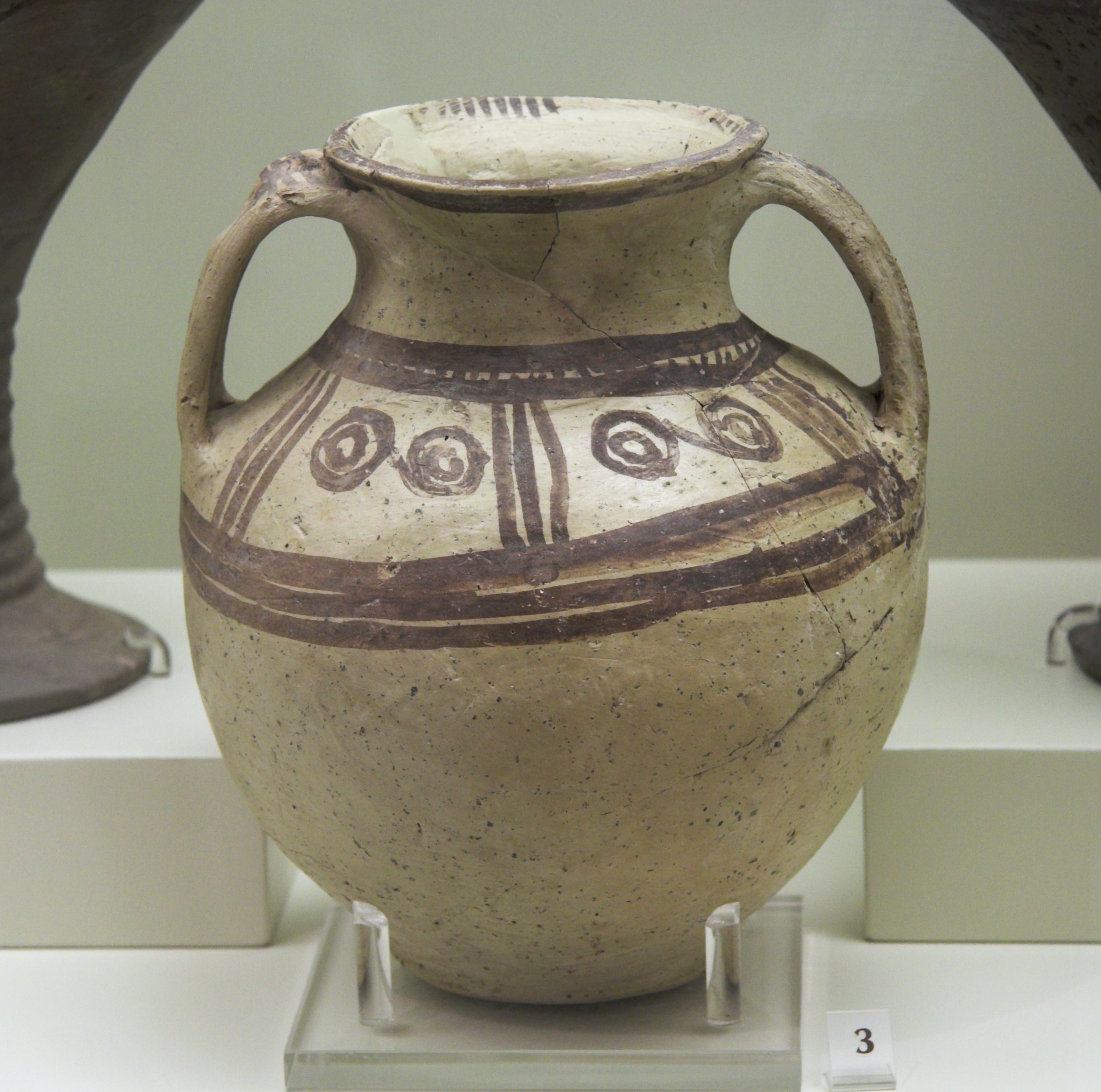
Amphora, MHIII, c. 1700-1600 BC

Minyan Ware is a form of monochrome burnished pottery produced from extremely fine or moderately fine clay. Varieties of Minyan Ware entail Yellow, Red, Gray, and Black (or Argive). Open forms such as goblets and kantharoi are the most common shapes in all types of Minyan Ware. Goblets and kantharoi are technically evolved versions of the Bass bowl and kantharos of the Early Helladic III Tiryns culture.

Gray Minyan Ware, specifically, has angular forms that may reflect copies of metallic prototypes. However, such a theory is difficult to substantiate given the fact that metallic objects from the Middle Helladic period are rare and metallic vessels are almost non-existent. Yet, the angular forms of this particular pottery style may in fact be derived from the common use of the fast potter's wheel. "Ring stems" (or highly ribbed pedestal feet) are an important characteristic of Middle Helladic II and Middle Helladic III Gray Minyan Ware in central Greece. Of course, this characteristic is also present on Middle Helladic III Yellow Minyan Ware goblets from Corinth and the Argolid. During the final phase of the Middle Helladic period, shallowly incised rings more or less replaced goblet feet and "ring stems" in northeastern Peloponnese.

Minyan Ware from the Middle Helladic I period is decorated in the form of grooves on the upper shoulder of kantharoi and bowls. During the Middle Helladic II period, stamped concentric circles and "festoons" (or parallel semicircles) became a common characteristic of decoration especially on Black (or Argive) Minyan Ware.

== Areas of production ==
Gray Minyan Ware is mostly found in central Greece and is also common in the Peloponnese during the Middle Helladic I and Middle Helladic II periods. Black (or Argive) Minyan Ware is common in northern Peloponnese and is mostly decorated with stamped and incised ornaments. Red Minyan Ware is commonly found in Aegina, Attica, the northern Cyclades and Boeotia. Yellow Minyan Ware first appears during the Middle Helladic II and Middle Helladic III periods. Due to its light surface color, this particular variety of pottery is decorated with dark matt-paint. This has led archaeologists to regard Yellow Minyan Ware as "Matt-Painted" instead of "Minyan".

== Outside mainland Greece ==
=== Crete ===
Luca Girella made an overview of the wheel-made grey ware on Crete, and its history there. According to the author, the earliest and rather isolated find of Grey Minyan Ware on Crete is reported from a MM IA level at Knossos. It was probably an import from the mainland Greece. Yet, during the same period, a lot more Minoan artefacts were found in Greece.

The Grey Ware on Crete, while present for a long time, was never widespread until the Mycenaean period, when there was even some local production of this ware at Kommos and Khania.

Before the Mycenaean period, during the First Palace phase (the period of MM IB-IIB, 2000-1700 BC), Grey Minyan was not present on Crete. Instead, the Kamares Ware was quite popular, and functioned as a prestige good.

=== Anatolian Grey Ware ===
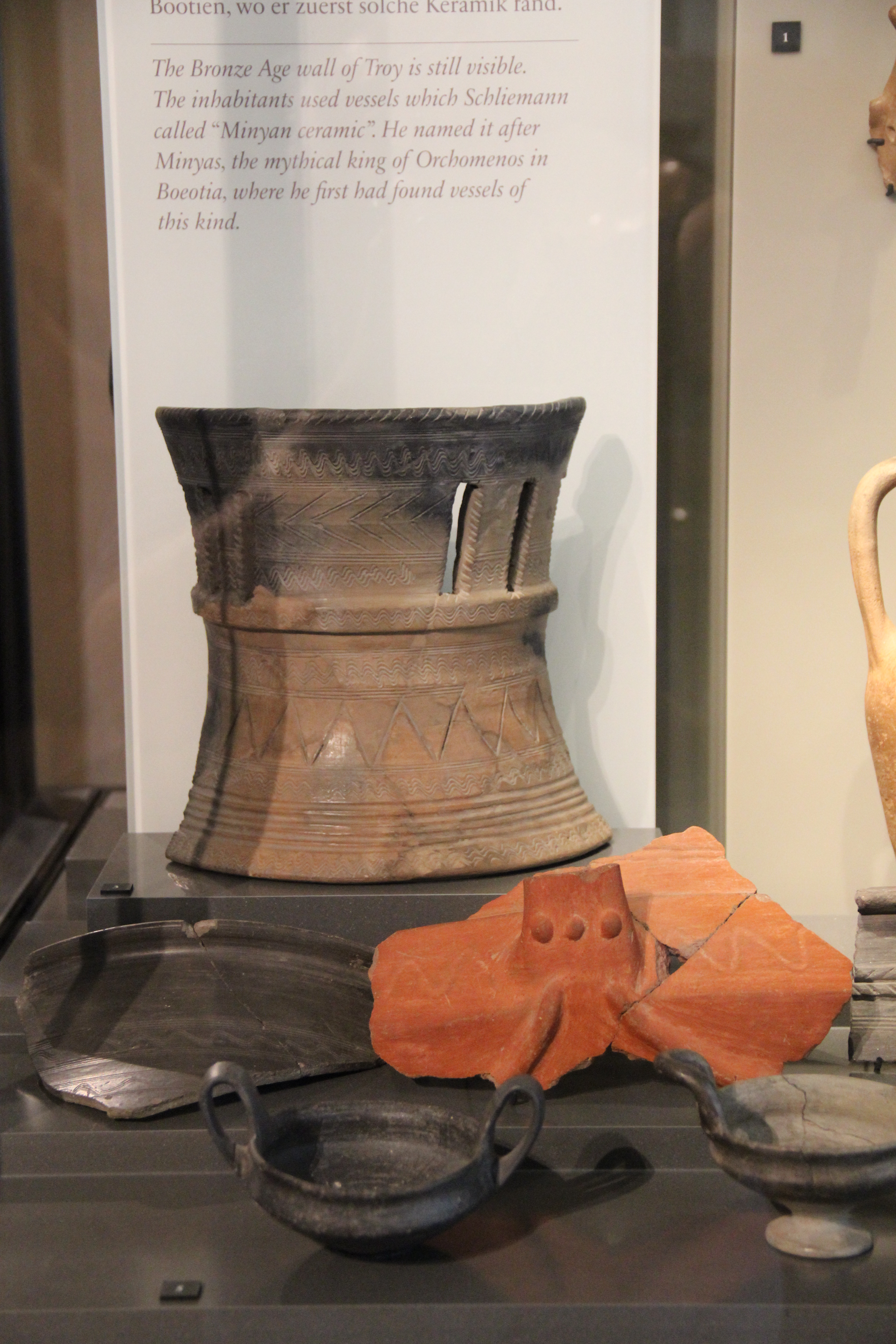
'Minyan Ceramics' from Ancient Troy. Neues Museum, Berlin

Along the costal zone of western Anatolia, and on the islands nearby, the north-west Anatolian Grey Ware was produced, also under the Mycenaean influence. Some of the shapes of this ware, such as kraters, stirrup jars, and kylikes were inspired by the Mycenaean shapes. They were likely used in the Mycenaean-type banquet contexts.

Pottery very similar to Grey Minyan Ware is known in Anatolia, dated around 14th–13th centuries BC. It has been suggested that "North-West Anatolian Grey Ware" should be used for this type of pottery. Around 2002, the term "Anatolian Grey Ware" was used by scholars.

=== Southern Italy ===
During the Mycenaean period on Crete, there were some contacts with the so-called pseudominyan ware tradition of southern Italy. The genuine imported Minyan Ware is quite rare in Italy. Only a few such items have been found here. Yet the locally produced Minyan-type ware is quite common, along with the similar burnished ware.

== See also ==
- Helladic period
- Mycenaean Greece
- Minyans
- Pelasgians
