= Aeolus (son of Hippotes) =

Greek mythological ruler of the winds

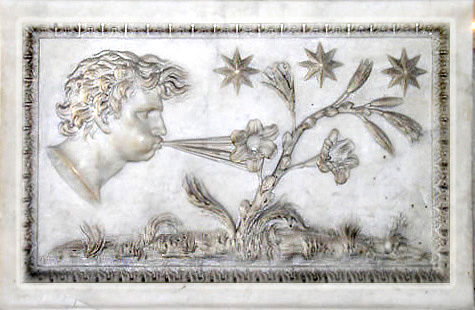
Aeolus

In Greek mythology, Aeolus (/ˈiːələs/; Ancient Greek: Αἴολος, romanized: Aíolos, pronounced [ǎi̯.olos]), the son of Hippotes, was the ruler of the winds encountered by Odysseus in Homer's Odyssey. Aeolus was the king of the island of Aeolia, where he lived with his wife and six sons and six daughters. To ensure safe passage home for Odysseus and his men, Aeolus gave Odysseus a bag containing all the winds, except the gentle west wind. But when almost home, close enough to smell fresh bread being baked and even see Odysseus' mother, Anticlea, waving to him, Odysseus' men, thinking the bag contained treasure, opened it and they were all driven by the winds back to Aeolia. Believing that Odysseus must evidently be hated by the gods, Aeolus sent him away without further help. This Aeolus was also sometimes confused with the Aeolus who was the son of Hellen and the eponym of one of the four major Ancient Greek tribes, the Aeolians.

== Family ==
All that Homer's Odyssey tells us about Aeolus' family is that his father was Hippotes, that he had six sons and six daughters, that Aeolus gave his six daughters to his six sons as wives, and that Aeolus, his wife, and all their children lived happily together on the idyllic island paradise of Aeolia. In Euripides' lost tragedy Aeolus, one of Aeolus' six sons is named Macareus, and one of his six daughters is named Canace (also the name of one of the five daughters of Aeolus son of Hellen).

The Byzantine poet John Tzetzes (c. 1110–1180) gives the following names for Aeolus' children: the sons Periphas, Agenor, Euchenor, Clymenus, Xuthus and Macareus, and daughters Clymene, Callithyia, Eurygone, Lysidice, Canace and an unnamed one.

According to Apostolius, Aeolus took Telepora of the Laestrygonians as his wife who begot six daughters and as many sons. The names of the males were: Iocastus, Xuthus, Phalacrus, Chrysippus, Pheremon and Androcles. The names of the maidens were: Iphthe, Aeole, Periboea, Dia, Astycratea, and Hyphaestia.

== Mythology ==
=== Ruler of the winds ===
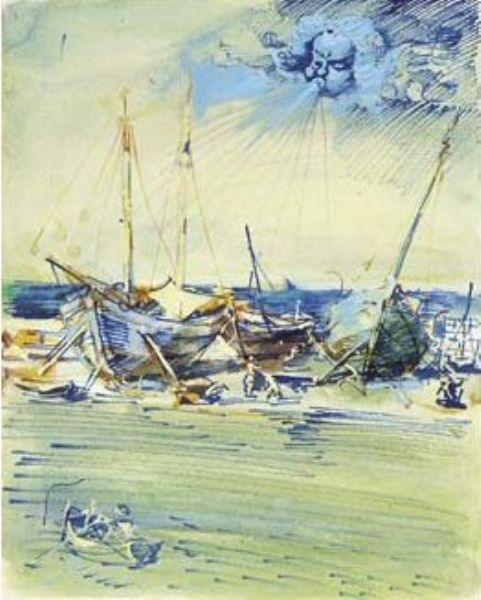
Aeolus by Alexandre Jacovleff shows Aeolus as an embodiment of Wind himself.

According to Homer, Aeolus the son of Hippotes was the king of the floating island of Aeolia, whom Zeus had made the "keeper of the winds, both to still and to rouse whatever one he will". In Apollonius of Rhodes's Argonautica, at the request of Hera, he calmed all the winds but the "steady" west wind, to aid Jason and the Argonauts on their journey home.

In Virgil's Aeneid, Aeolus keeps the winds contained in a cabin on Aeolia:

There closely pent in chains and bastions strong,
they, scornful, make the vacant mountain roar,
chafing against their bonds. But from a throne
of lofty crag, their king with sceptred hand
allays their fury and their rage confines.

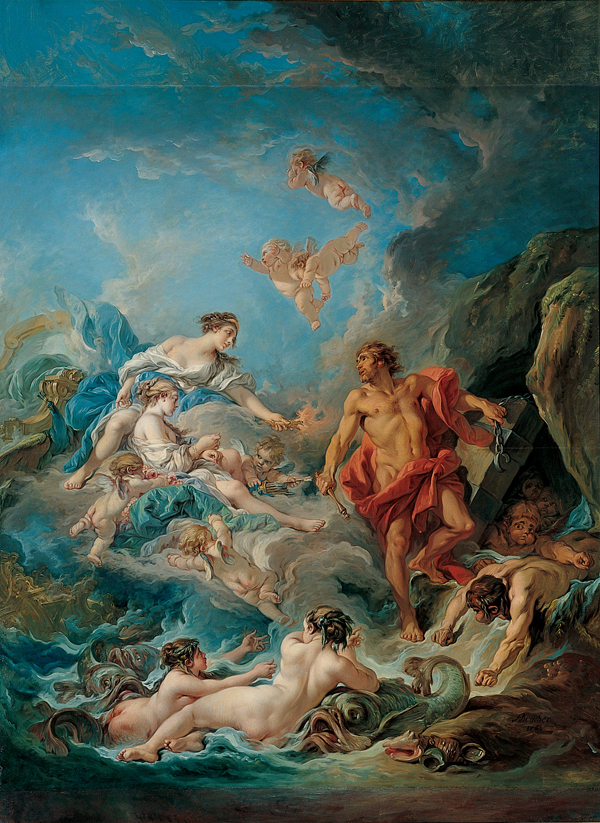
Juno asking Aeolus to release the winds, by François Boucher, 1769, Kimbell Art Museum.

Because of her hatred of the Trojans, Juno (the Roman equivalent of the Greek Hera) pleads with Aeolus to destroy Aeneas' ships, promising to give Aeolus the nymph Deiopea as wife. So Aeolus unleashed his winds against Aeneas. But Neptune, angry at this usurpation of his sovereignty over the sea, commands the winds to:

... Haste away
and bear your king this word! Not unto him
dominion o'er the seas and trident dread,
but unto me, Fate gives. Let him possess
wild mountain crags, thy favored haunt and home,
O Eurus! In his barbarous mansion there,
let Aeolus look proud, and play the king
in yon close-bounded prison-house of storms!

Neptune then quelled the monstrous waves that Aeolus' winds had stirred up, and Aeneas was saved.

=== Encounter with Odysseus ===
In Homer's Odyssey, Odysseus and his men, after escaping from the Cyclops Polyphemus, came next to the island of Aeolia:

where dwelt Aeolus, son of Hippotas, dear to the immortal gods, in a floating island, and all around it is a wall of unbreakable bronze, and the cliff runs up sheer. Twelve children of his, too, there are in the halls, six daughters and six sturdy sons, and he gave his daughters to his sons to wife. These, then, feast continually by their dear father and good mother, and before them lies boundless good cheer. And the house, filled with the savour of feasting, resounds all about even in the outer court by day, and by night again they sleep beside their chaste wives on blankets and on corded bedsteads.

Aeolus entertained Odysseus and his men for a month, questioning Odysseus about all that had happened to him. When Odysseus was ready to set sail again for home, Aeolus gave him a bag made of oxhide in which he had bound "the blustering winds", all except for the west wind, which Aeolus sent forth to bear Odysseus and his men safely home. But when they came within sight of Ithaca their home, Odysseus was overcome with sleep, and his men, thinking that the bag held gifts of gold and silver that Odysseus intended to keep for himself, opened the bag letting loose all the unruly winds which drove their ship all the way back to Aeolus' floating island. And when Odysseus asked again for help, Aeolus replied:

Begone from our island with speed, thou vilest of all that live. In no wise may I help or send upon his way that man who is hated of the blessed gods. Begone, for thou comest hither as one hated of the immortals.

The same story is also recounted by Hyginus, Ovid, and Apollodorus.

=== Aeolia ===
In the Odyssey, Aeolus' kingdom of Aeolia was a floating island surrounded by "a wall of unbreakable bronze". Later writers came to associate Aeolia with one of the Aeolian Islands, north of Sicily.

=== Confused with Aeolus son of Hellen ===
This Aeolus was sometimes confused (or identified) with Aeolus the son of Hellen and eponym of the Aeolians. The confusion perhaps first occurs in Euripides' Aeolus, where, although clearly based on the Odyssey's Aeolus, Euripides' Aeolus is the father of a daughter Canace, like Aeolus the son of Hellen, and if the two are not identified, then they seem, at least, to be related. Hyginus, describes the Aeolus encountered by Odysseus as "Aeolus, son of Hellen". While Ovid, has the ruler of the winds, like Aeolus the son of Hellen, the father of a daughter Alcyone, as well as the tragic lovers Canace and Macareus, and calls Alcyone "Hippotades", i.e. a descendant of Hippotes.

== Diodorus Siculus' account ==
The rationalizing Greek historian Diodorus Siculus explains how Aeolus came to be considered the ruler of the winds. According to Diodorus, Aeolus was said to be:

pious and just and kindly as well in his treatment of strangers; furthermore, he introduced sea-farers to the use of sails and had learned, by long observation of what the fire foretold, to predict with accuracy the local winds, this being the reason why the myth has referred to him as the "keeper of the winds"; and it was because of his very great piety that he was called a friend of the Gods.

Diodorus Siculus—perhaps in order to resolve a confusion between this Aeolus and the son of Hellen—also made Aeolus's father Hippotes the son of a Mimas, who was the son of Aeolus the son of Hellen. And while Homer does not name Aeolus' mother, wife, or children, Diodorus supplies names for all but his daughters. According to Diodorus, Aeolus' mother was Melanippe, his wife was Cyanê, and his six sons were Astyochus, Xuthus, Androcles, Pheraemon, Jocastus, and Agathyrnus.

== Palaephatus ==
Palaephatus sought to explain Greek myths through rational, historical interpretations. In his account of Aeolus, he notes that tradition portrays Aeolus as a man who controlled the winds and presented Odysseus with a bag containing them. Palaephatus dismisses this as an obvious impossibility, proposing instead that Aeolus was an astrologer, closer to what we would now call an astronomer, who advised Odysseus about the seasons and the times when particular winds would arise, as indicated by the rising of certain stars. He likewise rejects the claim that Aeolus' city was enclosed by a wall of bronze, arguing instead that its defenses consisted of hoplites guarding the city.

== Gallery ==
=== Aeolus and Odysseus ===
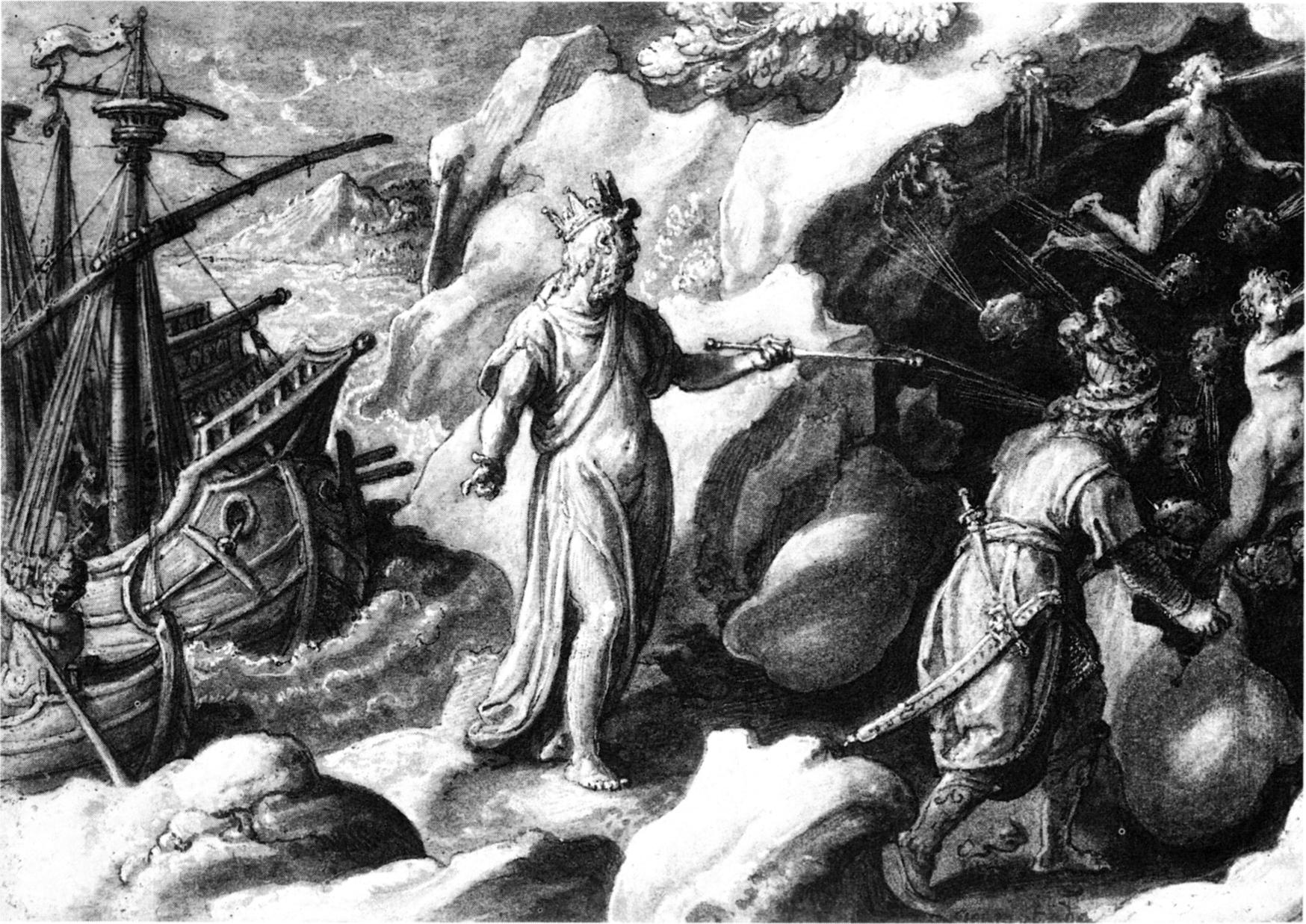
Odysseus in the Cave of the Winds by Stradanus (possibly 1590-1599)

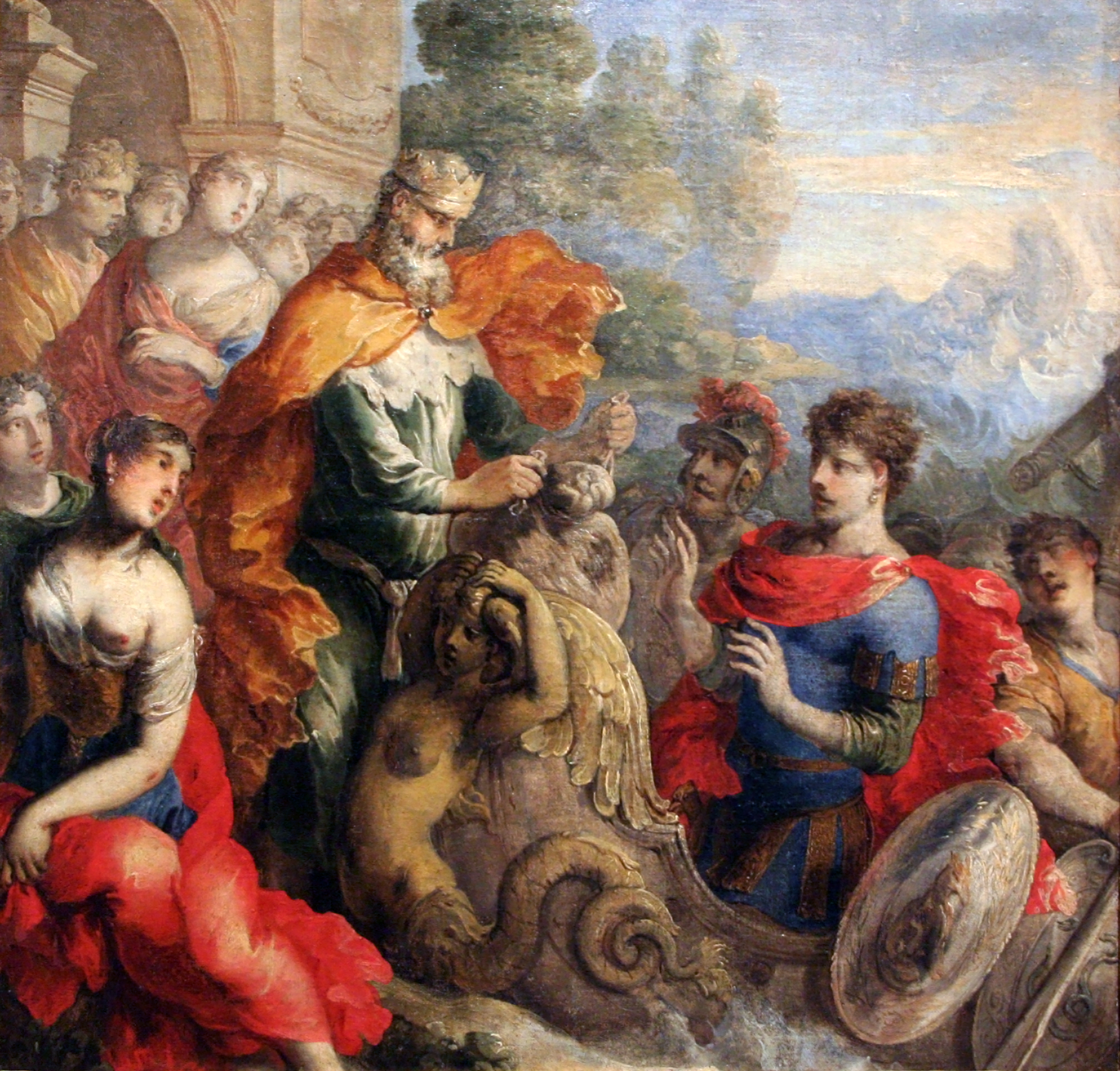
Aeolus Giving the Winds to Odysseus by Isaac Moillon

=== Aeolus and Juno ===
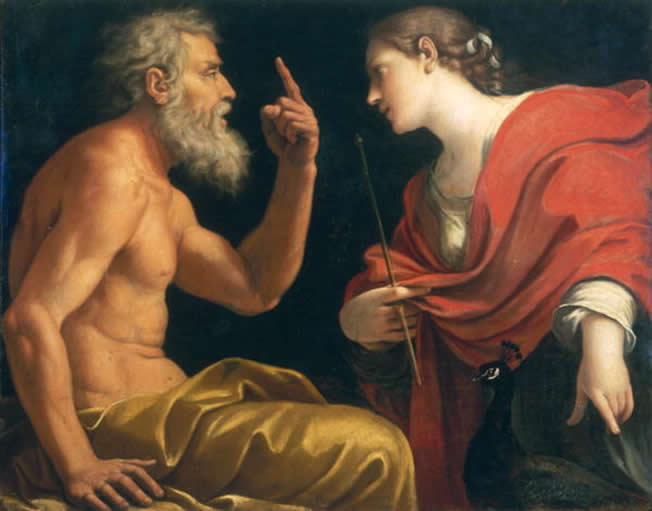
Aeolus and Juno by Lucio Massari

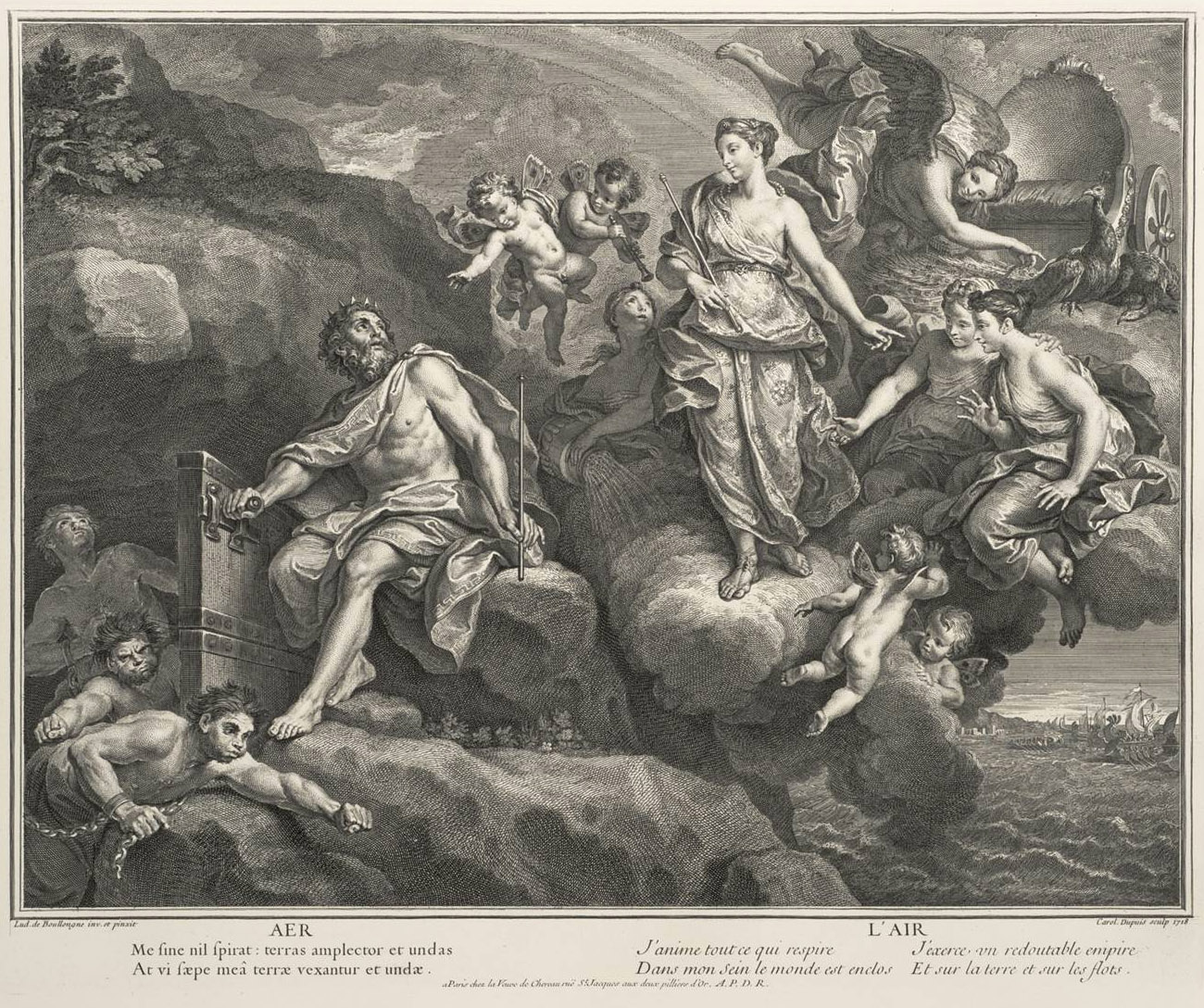
Air (Juno orders Aeolus to release the winds) (Aeneid I) by Charles Dupuis (1718)

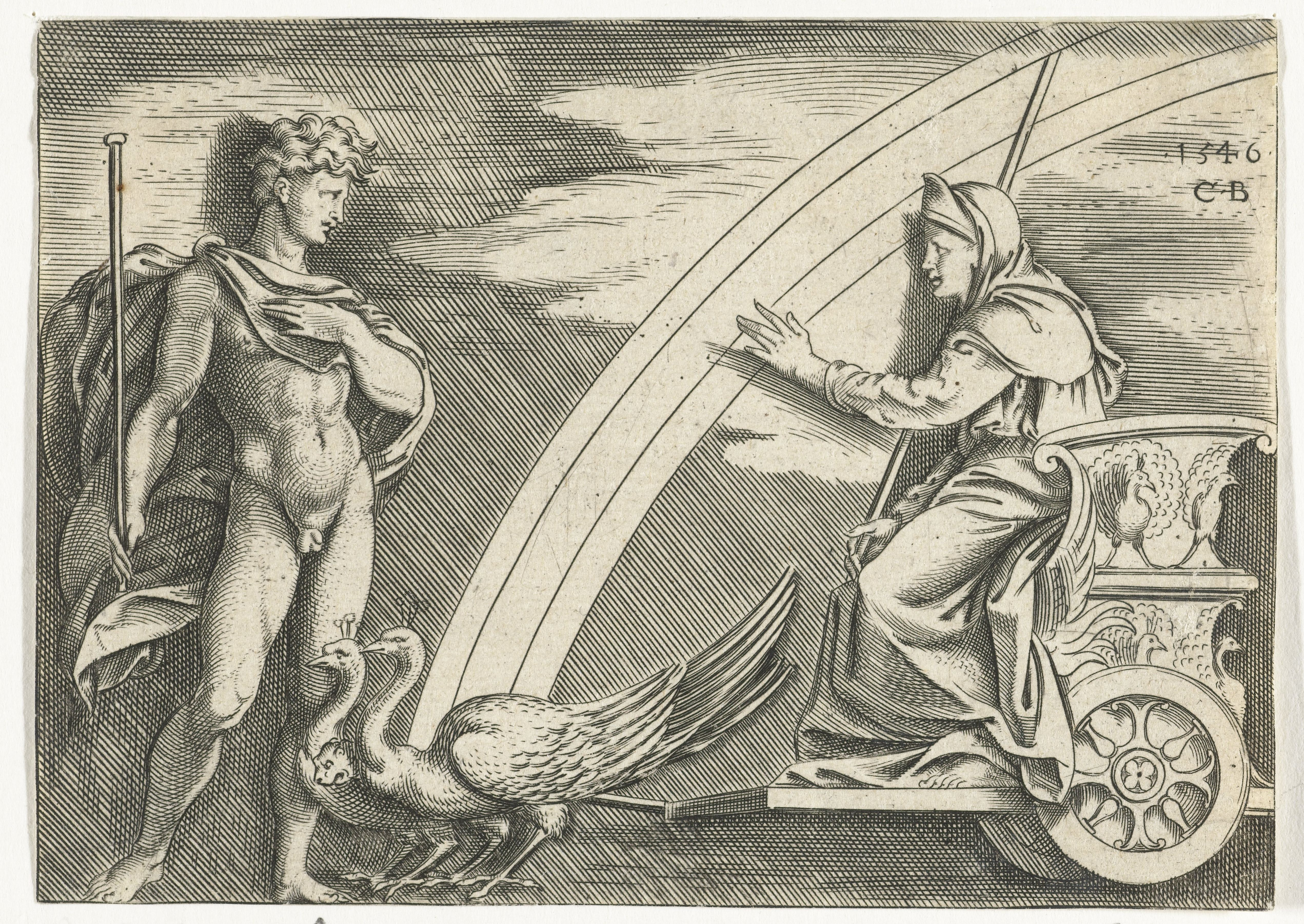
Juno en Aeolus by Cornelis Bos (1546)

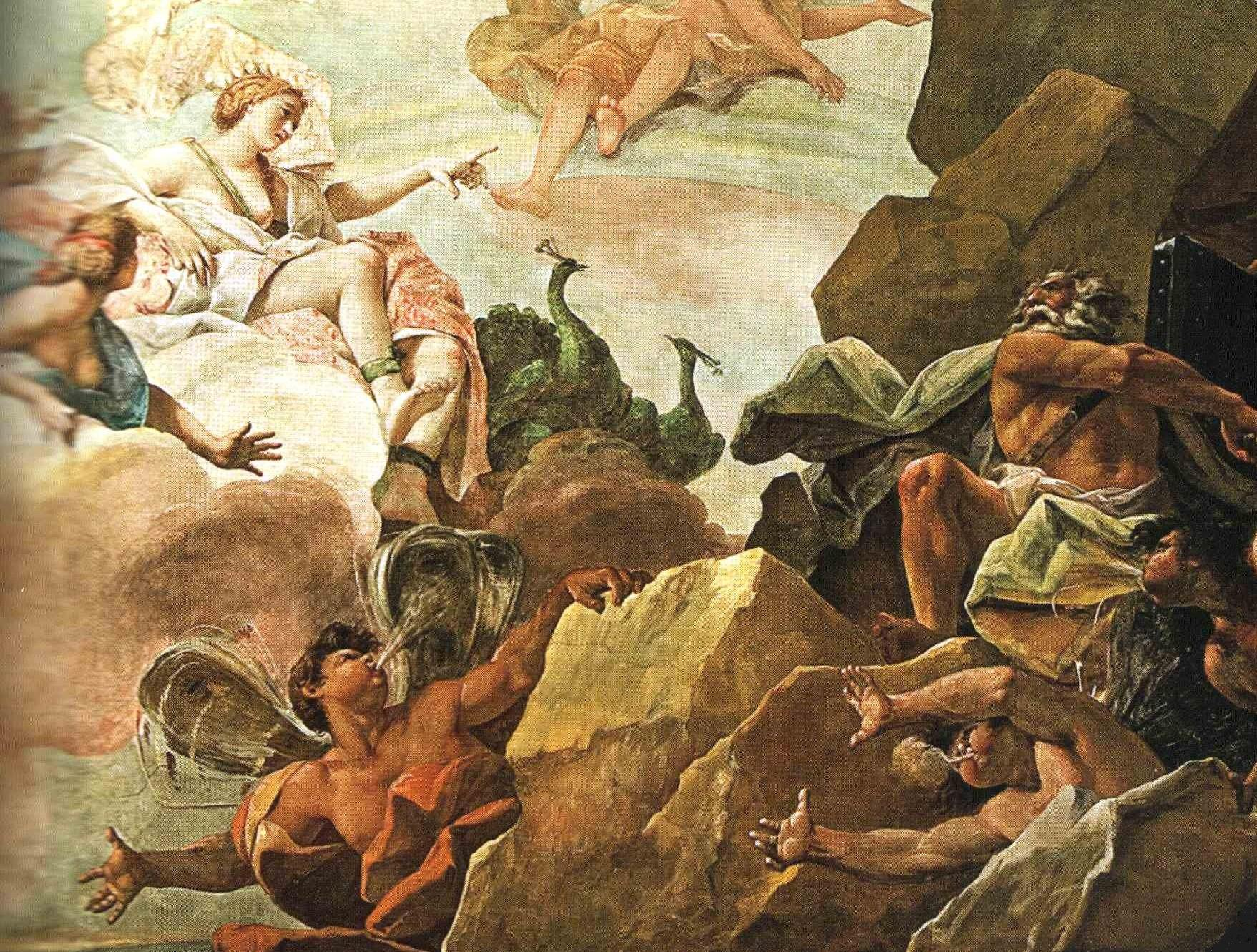
Giunone ordina a Eolo di liberare i Venti (particolare), affresco nel Palazzo Sanvitale di Parma. (circa 1790)

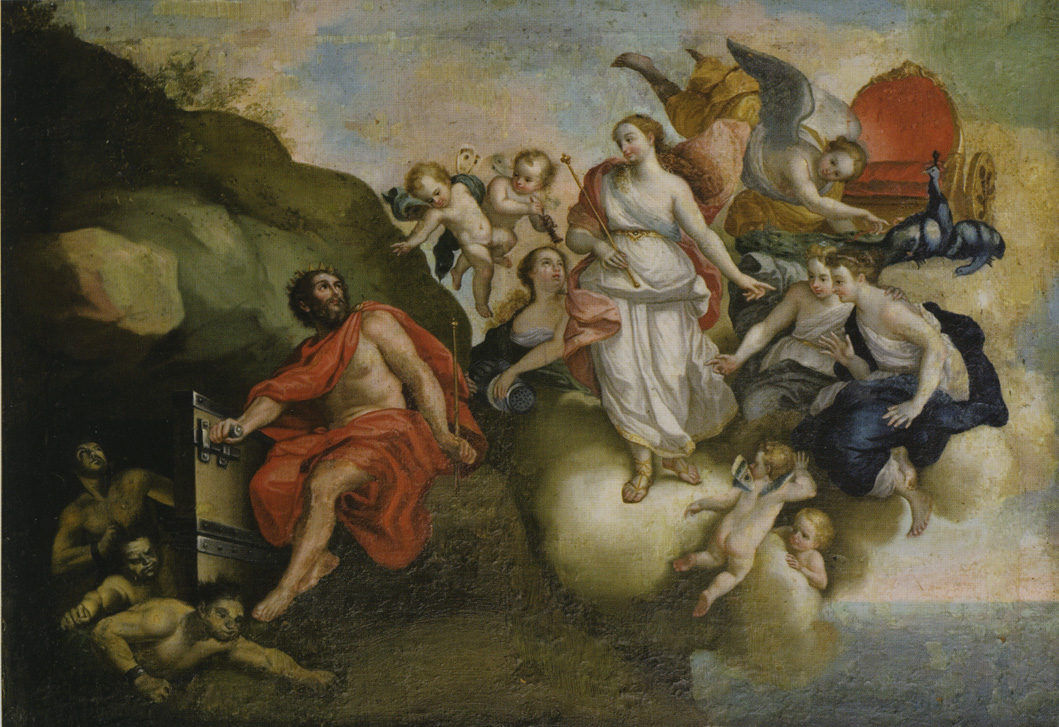
Air (Juno orders Aeolus to release the winds) by Manuel de Samaniego (circa 1800)

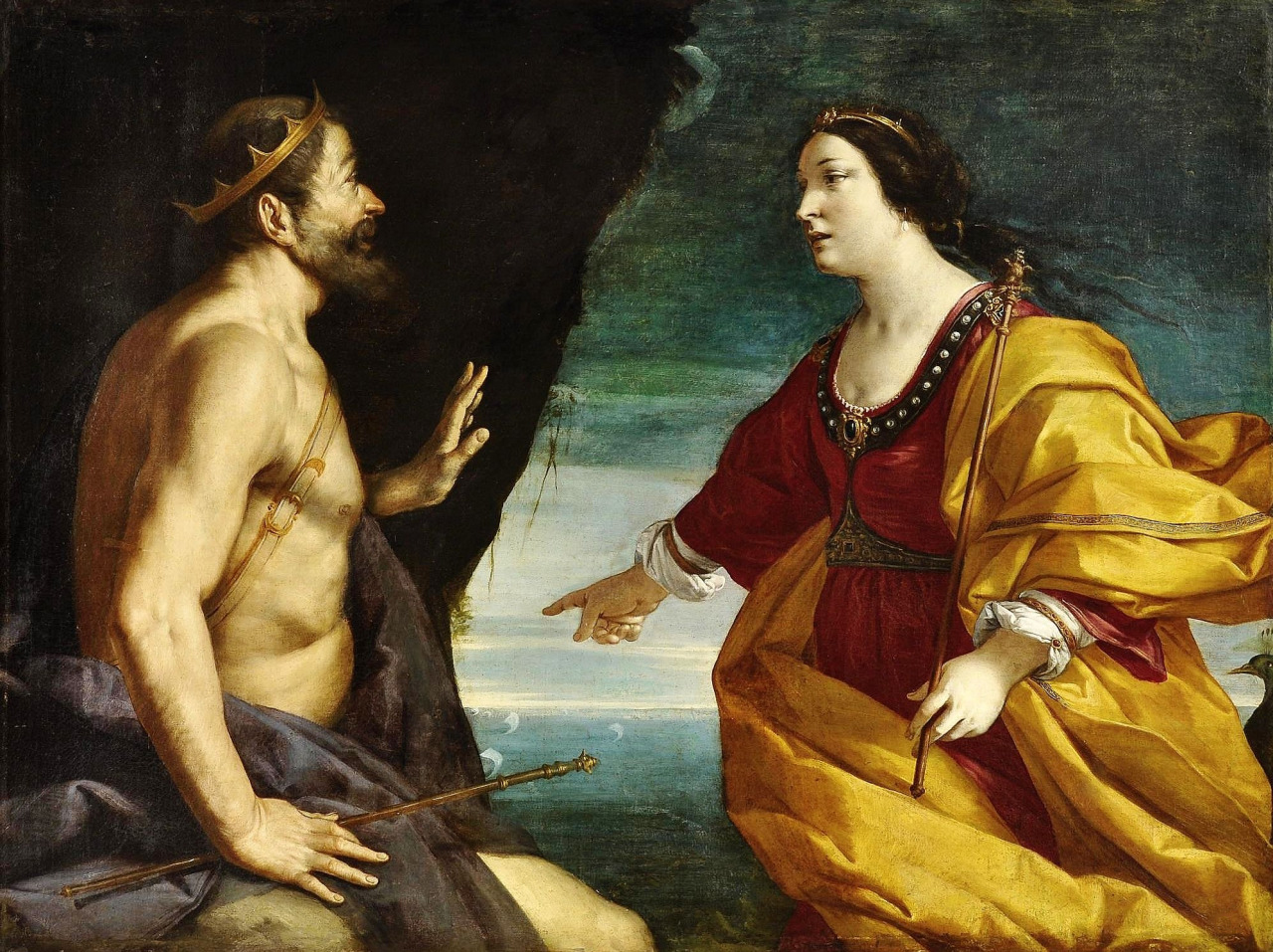
Juno and King Aeolus at the Cave of winds by Antonio Randa (Italy, 1577-1650)

=== Other ===
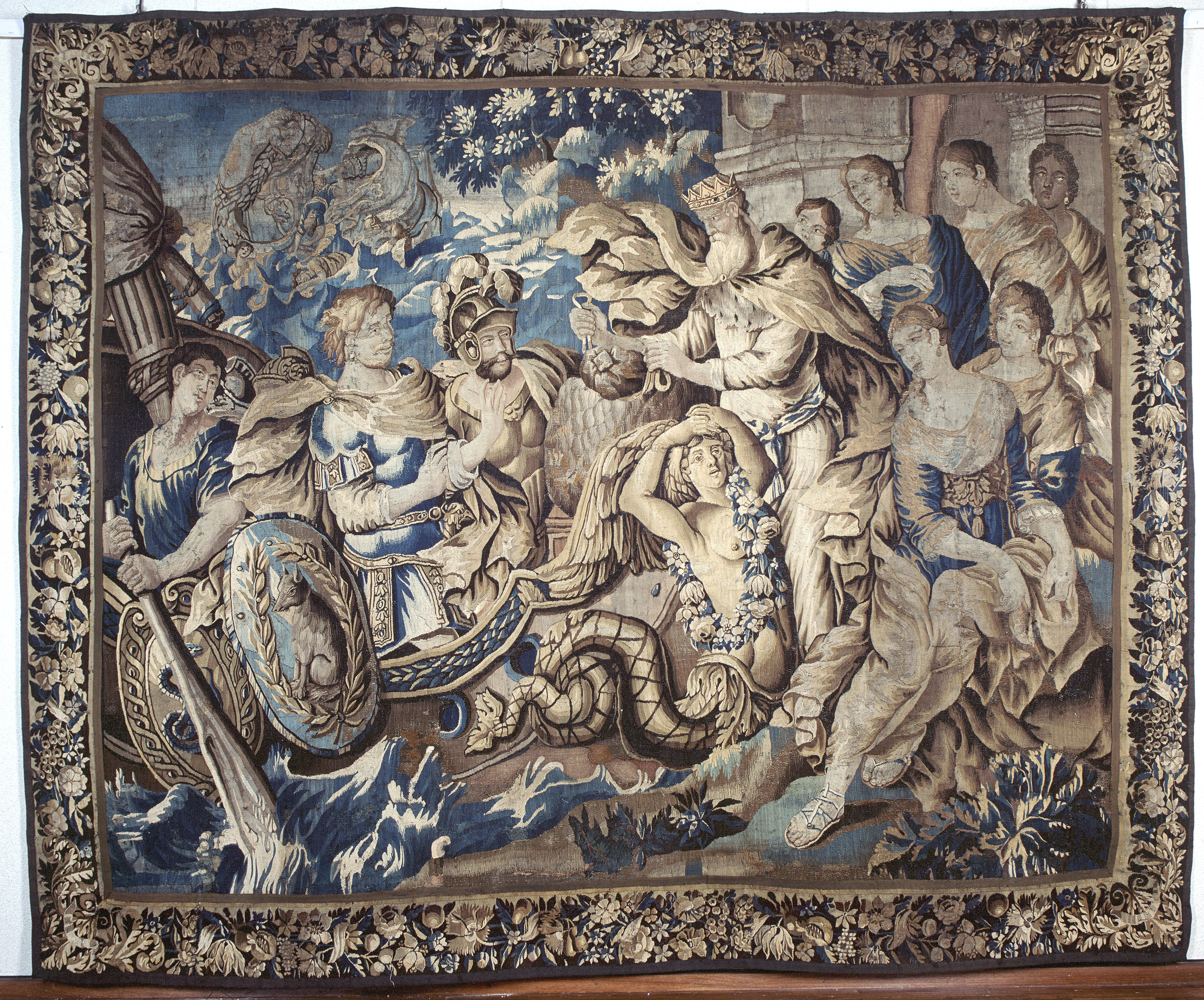
Aeolus

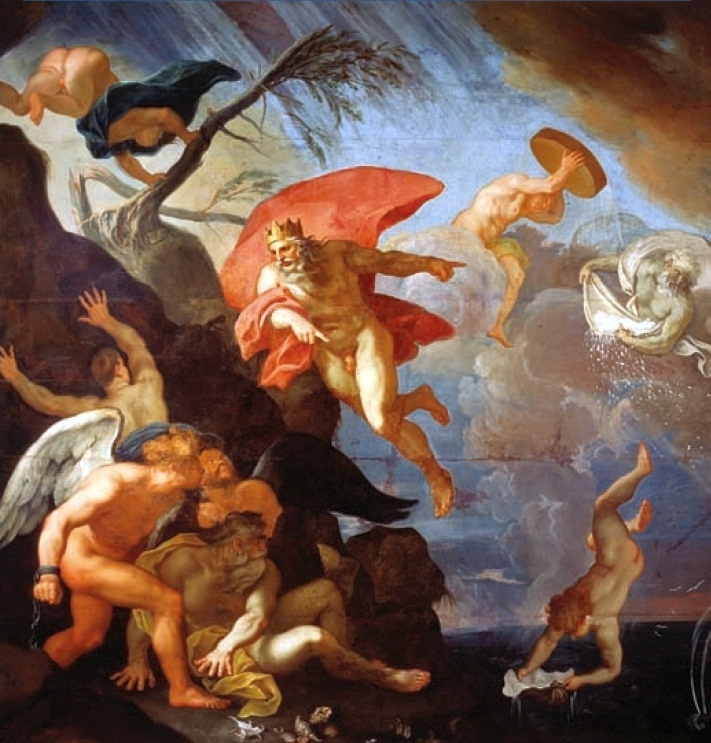
Allegory of Winter by Jerzy Siemiginowski-Eleuter (1683)

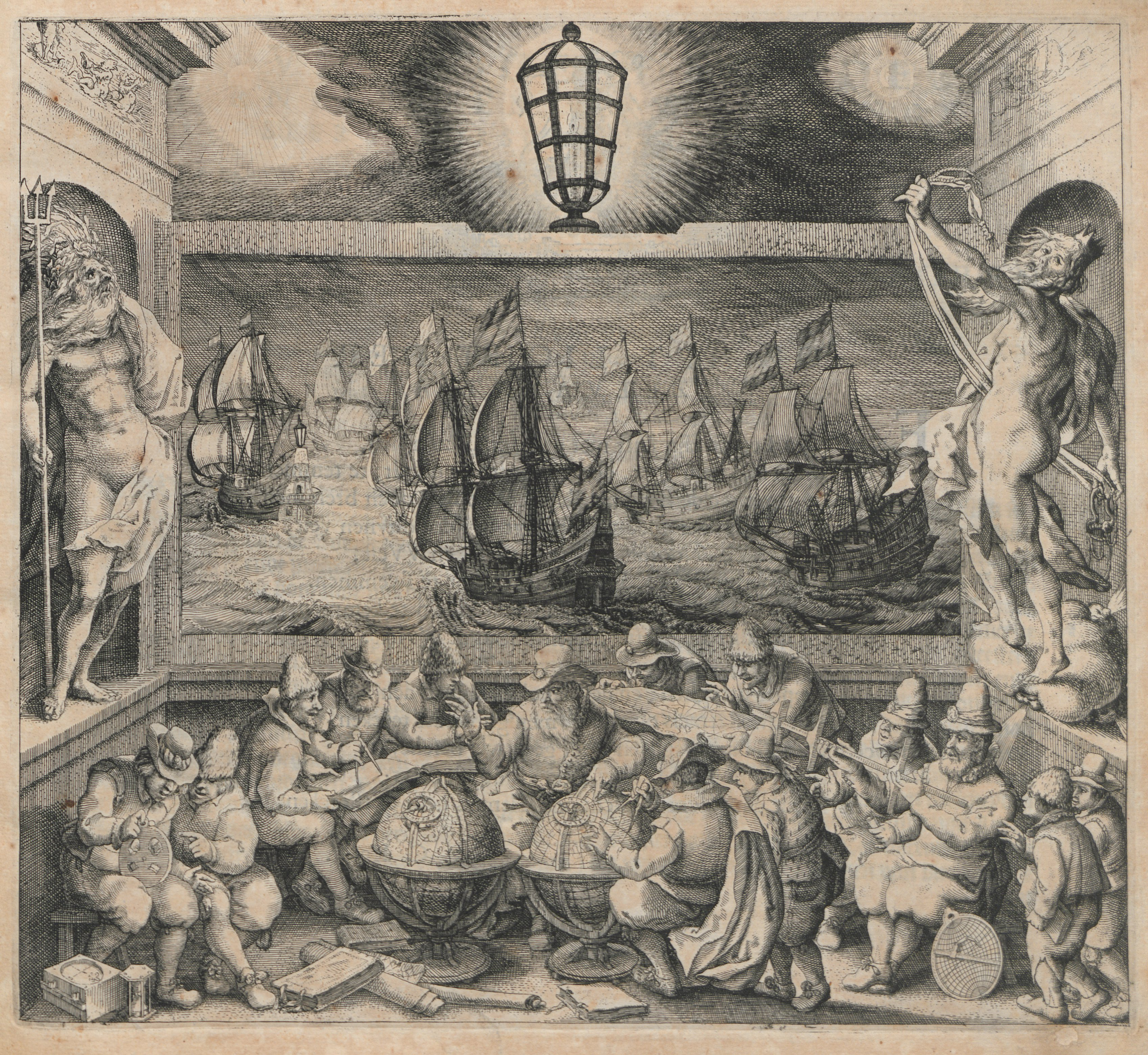
Book frontispiece of the sailing handbook "The light of navigation". (On the left side, Neptune, the god of water and the sea, on the right Aeolus, the ruler of the winds)

== See also ==
- Vayu, the Hindu god of the winds
- Rudra, the Vedic wind or storm god
- Fūjin, the Shinto kami of wind
