= Clymenus =

Several figures in Greek mythology

In Greek mythology, Clymenus (/ˈklɪmɪnəs/; Ancient Greek: Κλύμενος, romanized: Klúmenos, lit. 'famous, infamous') may refer to multiple individuals:

- Clymenus, a son of Phoroneus by either Cerdo or Teledice or Cinna. He and his sister Chthonia founded a sanctuary of Demeter.
- Clymenus was the son of Helios and king of Boeotia. In a variant genealogy, he is the father of the children of the Oceanid Merope (usually said to be the offspring of Helios and Clymene). These include Phaëton and the Heliades: Merope, Helie, Aegle, Lampetia, Phoebe, Aetherie, and Dioxippe. Sometimes Phaethousa is included in this number. The names "Clymenus" and "Merope" in Hyginus' version, which is not followed otherwise, may have resulted from incidental gender swap of the names of the Oceanid Clymene and her mortal husband Merops.
- Clymenus, who killed Hodites during the fight between Phineus and Perseus.
- Clymenus, son of Cardys and a descendant of Heracles of Ida. He became king of Olympia but was deposed by Endymion. He was credited with founding the temple of Athena Cydonia in Phrixa, Elis.
- Clymenus, a Calydonian prince as the son of King Oeneus and Althaea, daughter of King Thestius of Pleuron. He was the brother of Meleager, Periphas, Agelaus (or Ageleus), Thyreus (or Phereus or Pheres), Deianeira, Gorge, Eurymede and Melanippe. When the war between the Curetes and the Calydonians broke out, Clymenus along with his brothers, including Meleager, all fell during the battle.
- Clymenus or Periclymenus, son of either Presbon or Orchomenus (in the latter case, brother of Aspledon and Amphidocus) and a King of Orchomenus in Boeotia, which he inherited from its eponym Orchomenus - either as his son, or (in the version that makes him a son of Presbon) because Orchomenus left the kingdom to him, having no children of his own. By Boudeia or Bouzyge, daughter of Lycus, Clymenus was father of five sons: Erginus, Stratius, Arrhon, Pyleus, Azeus, and two daughters: Eurydice and Axia. At a festival of Poseidon at Onchestus, Clymenus quarreled with a group of Thebans over a minor cause and was mortally wounded as a result of a stone thrown at him by Perieres, the charioteer of Menoeceus. Being brought home half dead, Clymenus told Erginus, his successor-to-be, to avenge his death, and died; Erginus then led a war against Thebes.
- Clymenus, king of Arcadia, was the son of either Schoeneus or Teleus of Argos. By Epicasta, he fathered Idas, Therager and Harpalyce. He committed incest with his daughter which prompted him to commit suicide afterwards. Clymenus was also said to have eaten in a banquet the flesh of his sons by his own daughter Harpalyce, and killed her once he found out.
- Clymenus, one of the Argonauts, and the brother of Iphiclus. He was probably son of Phylacus and Clymene and thus brother of Alcimede, mother of Jason.
- Clymenus, one of the sons of King Aeolus of Lipara, the keeper of the winds. He had five brothers namely: Periphas, Agenor, Euchenor, Xouthos and Macareus, and six sisters: Klymene, Kallithyia, Eurygone, Lysidike, Kanake and an unnamed one. According to various accounts, Aeolus yoked in marriage his sons, including Clymenus, and daughters in order to preserve concord and affection among them.
- Clymenus, one of the Suitors of Penelope who came from Dulichium along with other 56 wooers. He, with the other suitors, was shot dead by Odysseus with the help of Eumaeus, Philoetius, and Telemachus.
- Clymenus, whose eldest daughter Eurydice was, according to Homer's Odyssey, the wife of Nestor.
- Clymenus, the name of Nyctimene's father in one version, who tried to rape his daughter.
- Clymenus, a title of Hades.
