= Periphas (king of Attica) =

Legendary king turned into an eagle by Zeus

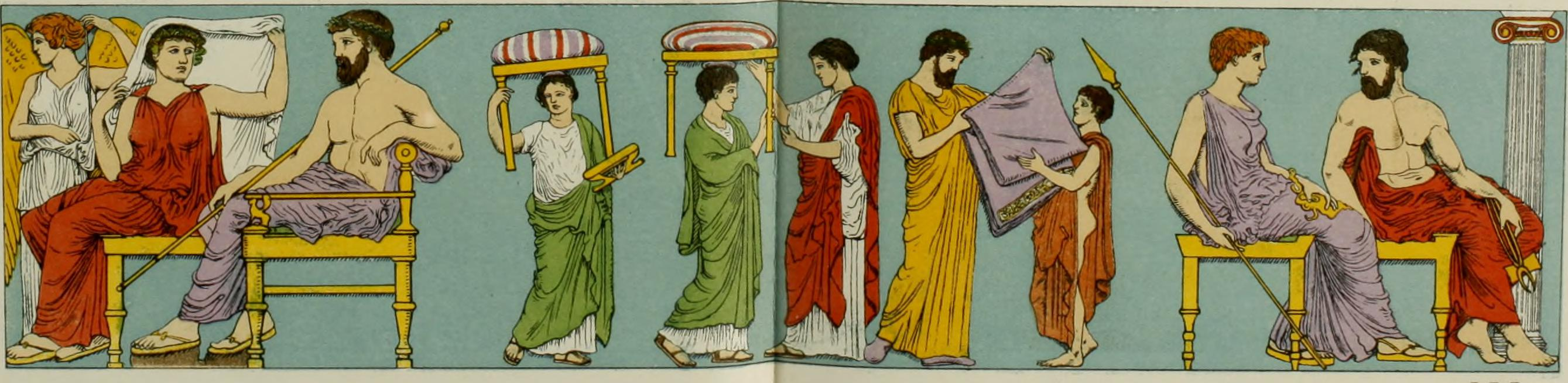
Illustration of a slab now in the British Museum of the apotheosis of the king and queen of Athens.

In Greek mythology, Periphas (/ˈpɛrɪfəs/; Ancient Greek: Περίφας, Períphās "conspicuousness") was a legendary king of Attica, whom Zeus turned into an eagle. Aside from a passing reference in Ovid's Metamorphoses, the only known source for this story is the second century AD or later Metamorphoses of Antoninus Liberalis.

== Mythology ==
In a time, before Cecrops, who was traditionally recorded to be the first king of Athens, the earth born (autochthon) Periphas ruled over Attica. He was a pious priest of Apollo, to whom Periphas made many sacrifices, and he was a just king, whose "fair judgments" were numerous. Periphas was above reproach and his rule was accepted willingly by all. But Periphas was so loved by his people that they paid him the honors which belonged to Zeus alone, building temples to Periphas and calling him Zeus Soter ("Saviour"), and Epopsios ("Overlooker of All") and Meilichios ("Gracious"). Being indignant, Zeus was determined to strike Periphas with a thunderbolt and consume Periphas and his entire household by fire, but because Periphas had been so faithful, Apollo asked Zeus to spare Periphas, and Zeus agreed. So instead Zeus came down into the house of Periphas, found Periphas in the arms of his wife Phene, and turned Periphas into an eagle. Because Phene begged Zeus to make her a bird also, as a companion for Periphas, Zeus turned her into a vulture. And Zeus made Periphas the king of all birds, placed him as guard over his sacred sceptre, and to Phene, the vulture, he granted that she become a good omen for men in all endeavors.

According to Arthur Bernard Cook, the story of Periphas is part of a tradition whereby an early king posing as Zeus is punished by Zeus, often by being changed into a bird.

== See also ==
- Aetos Dios
