= Aeolia (mythical island) =

Location in Greek myth

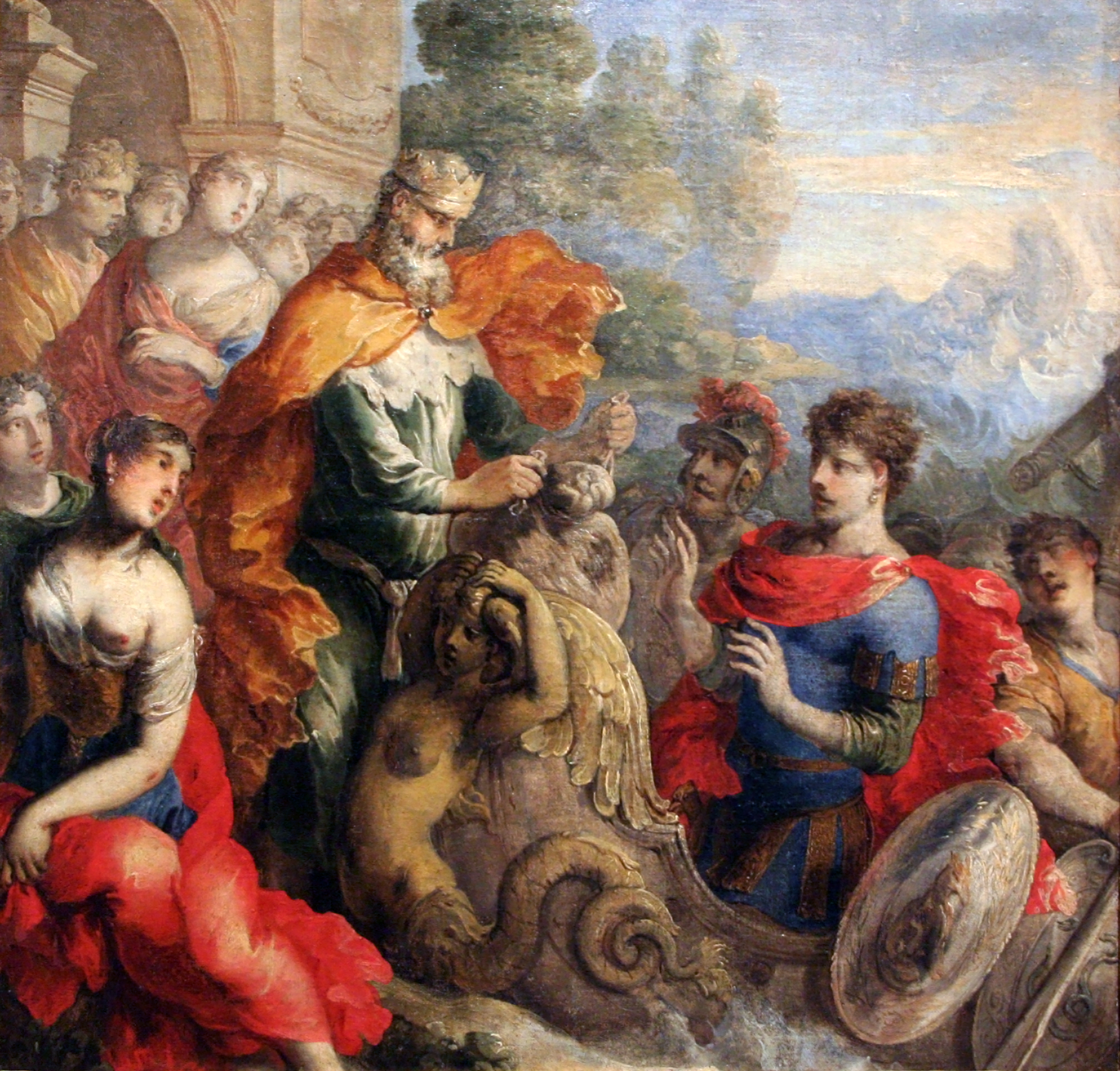
Odysseus on the island receiving the winds from Aeolus, painting by Isaac Moillon

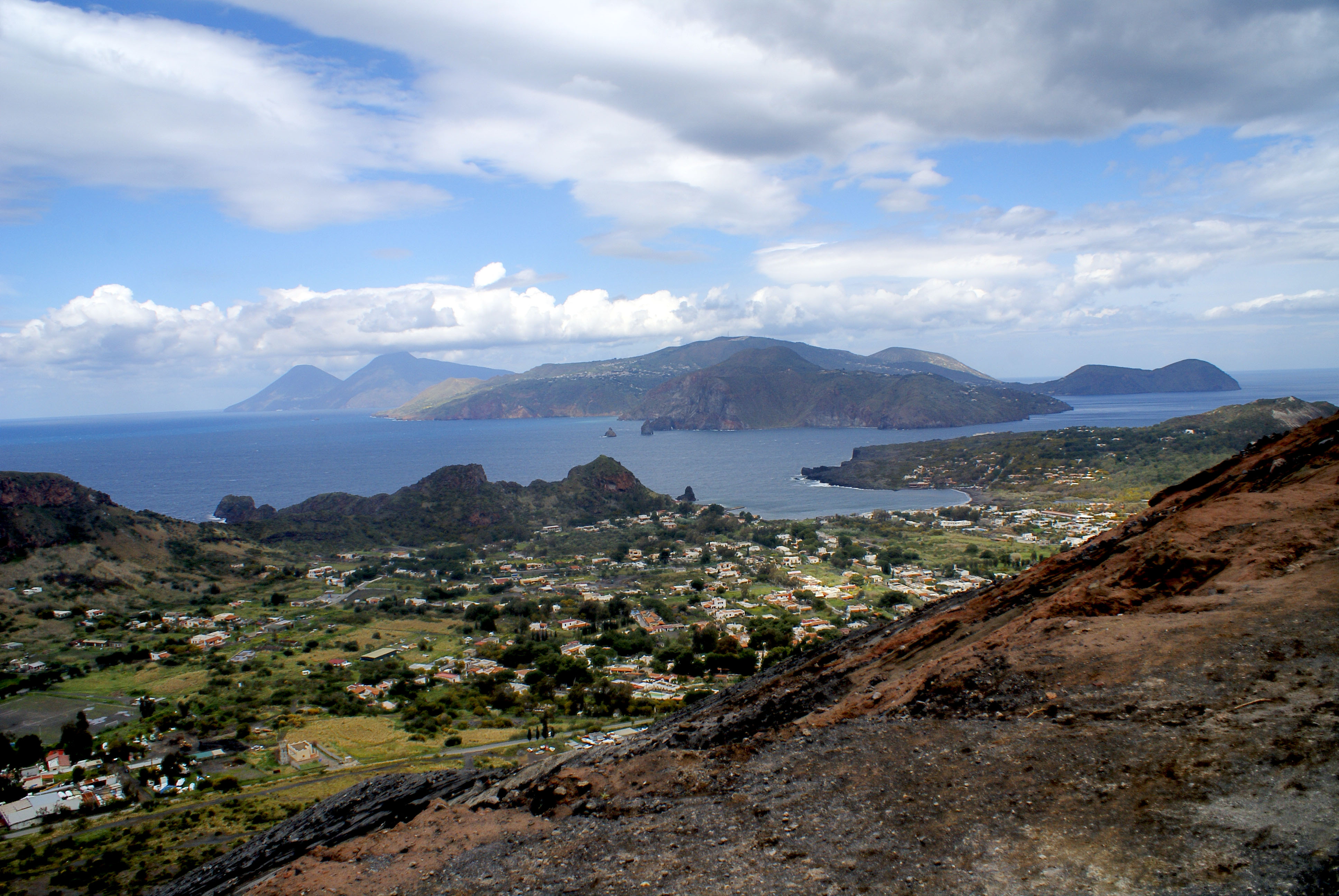
A view of some modern Aeolian Islands, standing on Vulcano, with Lipari in the middle, Salina at the left, Panarea at the right

Aeolia (Ancient Greek: Αἰολία, romanized: Aiolía), the island kingdom of Aeolus, the ruler of the winds, visited by Odysseus in Homer's Odyssey. In the Odyssey, Aeolus' Aeolia was a floating island surrounded by "a wall of unbreakable bronze" where the "cliffs run up shear."

Homer does not say anything about where the island was located, but later writers came to associate Aeolia with one or another of the Lipari Islands (also called the Aeolian Islands), north of eastern Sicily. The Greek geographer Strabo reports that Strongyle (modern Stromboli), one of the Lipari Islands, was said to be Aeolus' island. Others associated the island of Lipara (modern Lipari) with Aeolia.

The cult of Aeolus on Lipari is extraordinarily well-documented by the discovery of the so-called bothros of Aeolus on the Acropolis. Discovered in 1964 in front of the Cathedral, this votive deposit yielded an olpe bearing a dedicatory inscription to Aeolus, which made it possible to identify the deity with certainty. Archaeology has confirmed the site of the myth.
