= Erginus =

Erginus /ˈɜːrdʒɪnəs/ (Ancient Greek: Ἐργῖνος) was the name of the following figures:

- Erginus, king of Minyans and son of Clymenus.
- Erginus, one of the Argonauts.
- Erginus, a defender of Thebes in the war of the Seven against Thebes, killed by Hippomedon.
- Erginus, a descendant of Diomedes, who was instructed by Temenus to steal the Palladium from Argos and did so together with Leagrus (Leager), a friend of Temenus.
- Erginus, teacher of Isocrates
