= Aspledon =

City of ancient Boeotia

Coordinates: 38°30′46″N 23°02′04″E

Aspledon (Ancient Greek: Ἀσπληδών), also called Spledon (Σπληδών), was a city of ancient Boeotia, mentioned by Homer in the Catalogue of Ships of the Iliad, distant 20 stadia from Orchomenus. The river Melas flowed between the two cities. Strabo says that it was subsequently called Eudeielus or Eudeielos (Εὐδείελος), from its sunny situation; but Pausanias relates that it was abandoned in his time from a want of water. The town took its name from Aspledon, a son of Poseidon and the nymph Mideia.

Its site is near modern Pirgos.
