= Elizabeth Caskey =

Canadian-American classical scholar, professor

- Caskey in 1957
- Born: Clara Elizabeth Conningsby Gwyn; 20 May 1910; Saskatoon, Saskatchewan, Canada
- Died: January 1994 (aged 83); Lynchburg, Virginia, United States
- Occupations: Classical scholar, archaeologist
- Spouse: John Caskey (m. 1936; died 1981)
- Parent(s): Stratton Gwyn; Fanny Coningsby

Elizabeth Gwyn Caskey (20 May 1910 – January 1994) was a Canadian-American classical scholar, professor, and archaeologist, known for her work in the excavations at Lerna and Kea, which are of importance to Greek prehistory. As an archaeologist she worked with her husband, Jack Caskey, on excavations where she supervised the trenches of every annual dig and their fortifications. She also wrote summaries of the excavations. After her marriage ended she excavated at Pylos. She was a Professor of Classics at Randolph-Macon College who became Professor Emeritus in 1981.

== Early life ==
Elizabeth Caskey was born Clara Elizabeth Conningsby Gwyn on 20 May 1910 at Saskatoon, Saskatchewan, Canada. She was the third child of seven children (four girls and three boys) of Stratton Gwyn and Fanny Coningsby. She spent her early years in the prairies of Canada under difficult conditions. She attended elementary school at Dandas until 1921. From 1922, her high school education was at the Battleford Collegiate School at Battleford. She was a good debater in the school, and graduated from the school with distinction, getting the Governor General's Medal for Saskatchewan. From 1926 to 1927 she stayed at home learning piano as her mother thought she was too young to go to college.

At Cincinnati she met John Caskey, a fellow student and a Yale University graduate. They married on 1 August 1936. As John Langdon pursued his archaeological excavations at Troy where he had been working with since 1932, Elizabeth joined him in the field work for a short spell in 1938 assisting in some elementary work related to field archaeology. During her doctoral studies she also taught in the Classics department under a Taft teaching Fellowship. She received her doctoral degree from the university in June 1939 with her thesis on "Democritus and Plato." She presented her doctoral thesis at the 73rd Annual Meeting of the American Philological Association, which was held in Hartford, Connecticut from December 29-31.

== Professional career ==
During World War 2, Caskey started teaching Classics from 1942, initially as a substitute teacher in place of those who had opted for war duty and then as an instructor from 1942 to 1946. In 1948 she moved to Greece with her husband, where he worked as Assistant Director at the American School of Classical Studies in Athens. She pursued a career as a librarian from 1948 to 1958, and occasionally taught numismatics and ancient pottery to graduate students, drawing on the data of archaeological excavations in Athenian Agora. She also assisted students to study flora and fauna during their field excavations of the ruins.

In 1952 with the support of the school, Caskey along with her husband started working on the archaeological excavations at Lerna. In 1952, with the support of the school, along with her husband she started working on the archaeological excavations at Lerna, a pre-Mycaeanean site in the Peloponnese, south of Argos on the road to Tripolis; the work related to the Middle Bronze Age, Bronze Age and neolithic periods. She had the task of supervising digs as "quarter master" in areas that provided information related to Early Bronze Age. Following completion of the Lerna excavations, and erecting a roof over the "House of Tiles", she took up the task of recording the excavations at the Eutresia at Boeatia in Southern Greece along with her husband. This work was published in Hesperia with support from the Institute for Advanced Study in Princeton.

In 1969 they came back to Cincinnati for a short period and then started another excavation at Agia Irini on the island of Kea off the coast of Attica during 1960, where the students of the college were also trained to establish the link between palace civilization of Crete and the Mycenanean centres in the Peloponnesos, south of Argos on the road to Tripolis. Following completion of Lerna excavations and erecting a roof over the excavations over the "House of Tiles" she took up the task of recording the excavations at the Eutresis at Boeatia in Southern Greece along with her husband and this work was published in Hesperia with support from the Institute for Advanced Study in Princeton. In 1969 they came back to Cinncinnari for a short period and then started another excavation at Agia Irini on the island of Kea off the coast of Attica during 1960, where the students of the college were also trained.

In the excavation conducted during 1963–1964, Caskey not only encouraged new archaeologists but also got involved with deep digging in Late Bronze Age sites, which exposed the largest building with peeled-out painted plaster in some rooms, pots, graffiti, drains, roads and other features. The publication titled "House A", published by W. Willson Cummer and Elizabeth Schofield, is dedicated to Caskey with the credit: "who excavated most of House A and made preliminary studies of much of the pottery."

In 1965, the recording of finds of a temple next to House A site and of pottery, mostly of the Late Bronze Age, animal bones, fragments of frescos, human skeletal and the terracotta statues were also done by a team under Caskey's supervision; her niece Lynne Radcliffe of Vancouver had joined this team. However, Caskey did not resume her work at the site as she had divorced her husband. From that point on, she used the nickname of "Betty".

After her return to Cincinnati, Caskey initially taught as an instructor at the university. Between 1967 and 1968, she taught at the Western College for Women in Oxford, Ohio, as assistant professor on a part-time basis.

She resumed excavations in Greece during summer 1968. She was a member of a rescue expedition of the American School and the University of Colorado, at Pylos in ancient Elis. This excavation was in the submergence area of a big dam and the excavation was concluded quickly from June 12 and August 17, 1968, supplemented with more work in 1970. The excavations unearthed antiquaries of "Middle Helladic occupation, wells of the late Geometric and Archaic periods, house foundations of the 5th to the 4th century BC, house walls and graves of the later Roman period, and some Byzantine occupation."

From fall of 1968 Caskey started working at the Randolph-Macon Woman's College in Lynchburg, Virginia, as associate professor and as professor from 1977. The subjects she taught here covered her special fields such as classical literature and philosophy, Greek, ancient history, art and archaeology. She was active in the Archaeological Institute of America. She was a member of the American School of Classical Studies. She was also associated with the Faculty Senate of Virginia on behalf of the Randolph-Macon. She took part in the activities of the women's initiatives of the "Lynchburg AAUW", the League of Women Voters, and the First Unitarian Church. She also pursued action related to environmental concerns and was a keen bird-watcher. She then devoted her time to publish many research articles, particularly on Plato's work, review of archaeological books. She retired in 1981 and was given the status of emeritus professor.

Caskey died in January 1994 in Lynchburg, where she had spent her retirement days.
