= Phalacrus =

Phalacrus may refer to:

- Phalacrus (mythology), a character from Ancient Greek mythology
- Phalacrus (beetle), a genus of beetles in the family Phalacridae
- Phalacrus, a genus of fishes in the family Centrolophidae; synonym of Centrolophus
