= Phene (mythology) =

Mythological Greek queen

In Greek mythology, Phene (Ancient Greek: Φήνη, romanized: Phḗnē, lit. 'vulture') is the name of a legendary queen of Attica, and the wife of Periphas. They were a just and fair royal couple who were transformed into birds by Zeus.

== Etymology ==
The ancient Greek noun φήνη means vulture, at least a kind of vulture. According to Celoria, the elements pha- and phe- in the names of Periphas and Phene can both be traced to the ancient Greek verb φαίνω (phaino), meaning 'to appear'. According to Beekes it has no clear etymology, and its alternative spelling φίνις (phínis), points to a pre-Greek origin, which according to him is the most likely possibility anyway.

== Mythology ==
Phene was married to Periphas, a king of Attica. Periphas was a pious and just man, beloved by his subjects, who then began to worship him as a god. They erected temples to him and worshipped him using Zeus's cult titles such as Soter (the saviour) and Epopsios ("overlooker of all"). This angered Zeus, who planned on striking Periphas with one of his thunderbolts to punish the hubris.

But then Apollo intervened and convinced his father to spare Periphas because he (Apollo) had been greatly honoured by the king. So he then came to Phene and Periphas's house, and found them conversing together. He turned Periphas into an eagle immediately. Phene, not wanting to be separated from her husband, asked to be changed into a bird as well. Her wish was fulfilled and she was transformed into a phene (φήνη), a kind of vulture (perhaps a lammergeier). By decree of Zeus, that vulture became a good omen for mankind.

== Sources ==
Antoninus Liberalis, who recorded the tale, did not mention Phene's name, only the bird she transformed into, and simply referred to her as Periphas's wife. Her name comes from an earlier Roman writer, Ovid, who only mentions her in passing along with Periphas. Ovid describes her as 'most just Phene'. Aristotle claimed that phenai brought up the eagle's young. It is not clear who the earlier source is for this tale, but several elements in it (the wife, the direct punishment, the lack of a local aition) point to Boios rather than Nicander.

== See also ==
- Orpheus
- Dido
- Laodamia of Phylace

== Bibliography ==
- Antoninus Liberalis, The Metamorphoses of Antoninus Liberalis translated by Francis Celoria (Routledge 1992). Online version at the Topos Text Project.
- Beekes, Robert S. P. (2010). Lucien van Beek (ed.). Etymological Dictionary of Greek. Leiden Indo-European Etymological Dictionary Series. Vol. ΙΙ. Leiden, the Netherlands: Brill Publications. ISBN 978-90-04-17419-1.
- Celoria, Francis (1992). The Metamorphoses of Antoninus Liberalis: A Translation with Commentary. Routledge. ISBN 9780415068963.
- Forbes Irving, Paul M. C. (1990). Metamorphosis in Greek Myths. Clarendon Press. ISBN 0-19-814730-9.
- Liddell, Henry George; Scott, Robert (1940). A Greek-English Lexicon, revised and augmented throughout by Sir Henry Stuart Jones with the assistance of Roderick McKenzie. Oxford: Clarendon Press. Online version at Perseus.tufts project.
- Ovid (1916). Metamorphoses. Loeb Classical Library 42. Vol. I: Books 1-8. Translated by Frank Justus Miller, revised by G. P. Goold. Cambridge, MA: Harvard University Press.
- Smith, William (1873). A Dictionary of Greek and Roman Biography and Mythology. London: John Murray, printed by Spottiswoode and Co., New-Street Square and Parliament Street.
