= Mideia =

In Greek mythology, Mideia (Ancient Greek: Μιδεία) or Midea (Μιδέα) may refer to the following women:

- Midea, a Phrygian slave who bore Licymnius by Electryon.
- Midea, the nymph mother of Aspledon by Poseidon. The town Lebadea was believed to have previously been named Mideia after her.
- Midea, one of the Danaïdes. She married (and killed) Antimachus, son of Aegyptus.
- Midea, daughter of Aloeus and eponym of a city in Argos.
