= John Caskey =

American archaeologist and classical scholar

John Langdon Caskey (1908–1981) was an American archaeologist and classical scholar. He directed the American School of Classical Studies in Athens from 1949 to 1959, and was head of the Classics department at the University of Cincinnati from 1959 to 1979. His career focused on excavations at the ancient settlements of Troy, Lerna, and Keos. Until their marriage ended, he worked with his spouse Elizabeth Caskey who went to excavate on her own after they parted.

Caskey was an elected member of the American Philosophical Society and the American Academy of Arts and Sciences. He was awarded the Gold Medal for Distinguished Archaeological Achievement by the Archaeological Institute of America in 1980.
