= Macareus (son of Aeolus) =

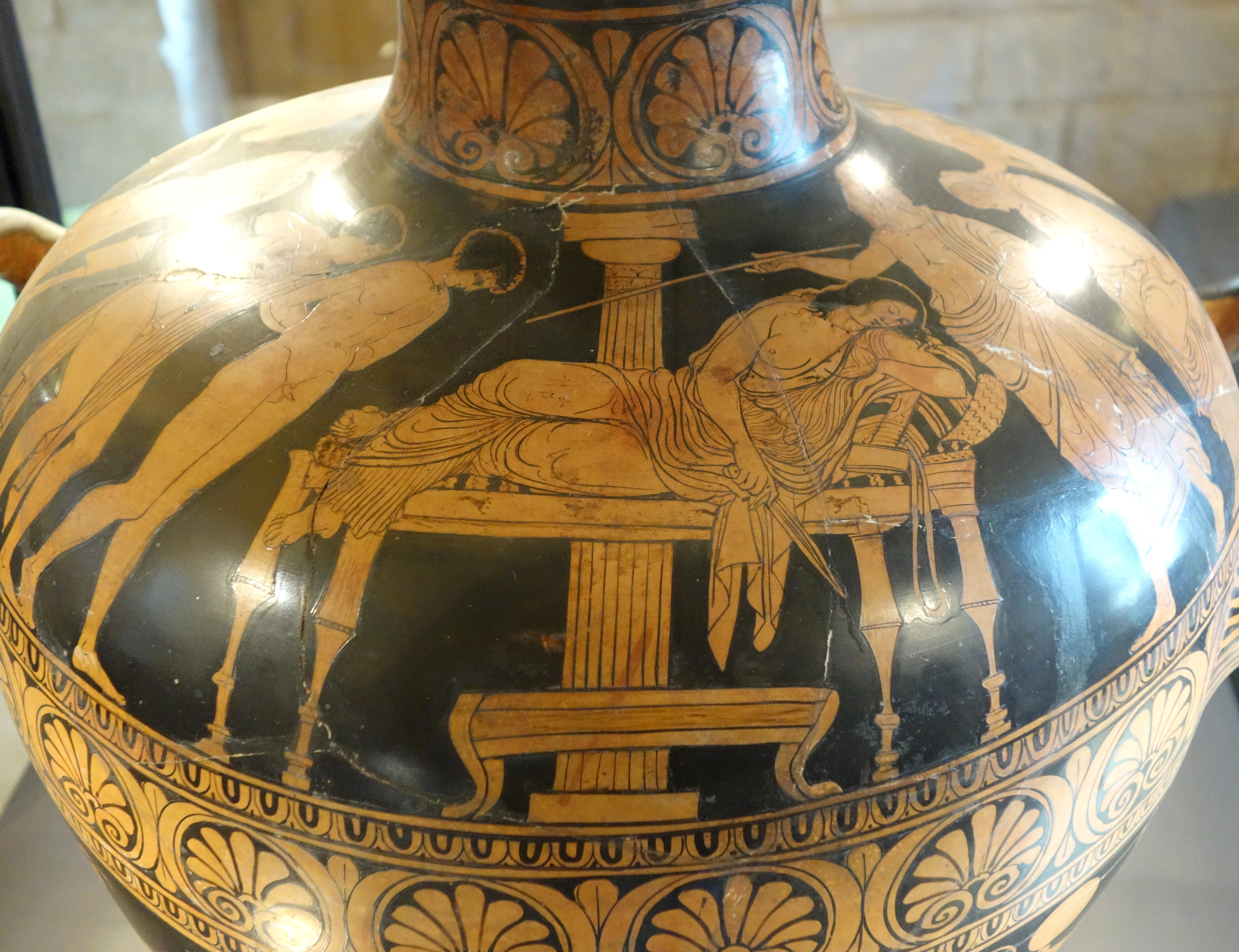
Lucanian red-figure hydria with the death of Canace, Macareus stands on the left; c. 415–410 BCE, Bari, Museo archeologico di S. Scholastica.

Macareus (/məˈkæriəs, -ˈkɑːrjuːs/; Ancient Greek: Μακαρεύς Makareus 'happy') or Macar (/ˈmeɪkər/; Ancient Greek: Μάκαρ Makar) was, in Greek mythology, the son of Aeolus, though sources disagree as to which bearer of this name was his father: it could either be Aeolus the lord of the winds, or Aeolus the king of Tyrrhenia. His mother was, at least in the latter case, Amphithea.

== Mythology ==
Macareus and his sister Canace fell in love with each other and had a child together. Canace was ordered to kill herself and the baby exposed by Aeolus after he had discovered this, and Macareus killed himself.

Macareus, son of Aeolus, is also given as the father of Amphissa or Issa, who was seduced by Apollo in disguise of a shepherd. Ancient sources do not clarify whether she was the child of Macareus by Canace, or a different child by another unknown consort. In Ovid's account the child of Canace apparently doesn't survive.
