= Minyans =

Autochthonous group inhabiting the Aegan region according Greek mythology

In Greek mythology, the Minyans or Minyae (Greek: Μινύες, Minyes) were a group of legendary people who were the inhabitants of the city Orchomenus in Boeotia, and who were also associated with Thessaly. They were named after their eponymous ancestor, Minyas.

In archaeology, the term "Minyans" has been applied to the Minyan ware excavated from Orchomenus, and is used to refer to an autochthonous group of Proto-Greek speakers inhabiting the Aegean region, though the degree to which the material culture in the prehistory of the area can be securely linked to the legendary people or language-based ethnicity has been subjected to debate and repeated revision.

John L. Caskey's interpretation of his archaeological excavations conducted in the 1950s linked the ethno-linguistic "Proto-Greeks" to the bearers of the Minyan (or Middle Helladic) culture. More recent scholars have questioned or amended his dating and doubted the linking of material culture to linguistic ethnicity.

== Classical Greek uses of "Minyans" ==
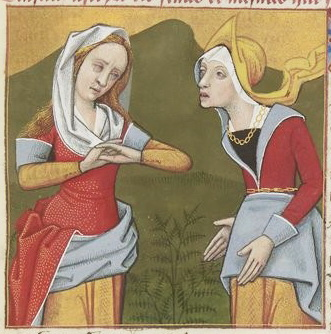
Wives of the Minyans in Boccaccio's De mulieribus claris

Greeks did not always clearly distinguish the Minyans from the Pelasgian cultures that had preceded them. Greek mythographers gave the Minyans an eponymous founder, Minyas, perhaps as legendary as Pelasgus (the founding father of the Pelasgians), which was a broader category of pre-Greek Aegean peoples. These Minyans were associated with Boeotian Orchomenus, as when Pausanias relates that "Teos used to be inhabited by Minyans of Orchomenus, who came to it with Athamas" and may have represented a ruling dynasty or a tribe later located in Boeotia.

Herodotus asserts several times that Pelasgians dwelt in the distant past with the Athenians in Attica, and that those Pelasgians driven from Attica in turn drove the Minyans out of Lemnos. The same historian also states that Minyans from Amyklai settled on the island of Thera in 800 BC.

Heracles, the hero whose exploits always celebrate the new Olympian order over the old traditions, came to Thebes, one of the ancient Mycenaean cities of Greece, and found that the Greeks were paying tribute of 100 cattle (a hecatomb) each year to Erginus, king of the Minyans. Heracles attacked a group of emissaries from the Minyans, and cut off their ears, noses, and hands. He then tied them around their necks and told them to take those for tribute to Erginus. Erginus made war on Thebes, but Heracles defeated the Minyans with his fellow Thebans after arming them with weapons that had been dedicated in temples. Erginus was killed and the Minyans were forced to pay double the previous tribute to the Thebans. Heracles was also credited with the burning of the palace at Orchomenus: "Then appearing unawares before the city of the Orchomenians and slipping in at their gates he burned the palace of the Minyans and razed the city to the ground."

The Argonauts were sometimes referred to as "Minyans" because Jason's mother came from that line, and several of his cousins joined in the adventure.

== Archaeology ==
=== Terminology ===
Before World War II, archaeologists sometimes applied the term "Minyans" differently, to indicate the very first wave of Proto-Greek speakers in the 2nd millennium BCE, among the early Bronze Age cultures sometimes identified with the beginning of Middle Helladic culture. Gray "Minyan ware" is an archaeologist's term for a particular style of Aegean pottery associated with the Middle Helladic period (ca. 2100–1550 BC). More recently, however, archaeologists and palaeontologists find the term "Minyan" to be questionable: "To call the makers of Minyan ware themselves 'Minyans' is reprehensible", remarked F. H. Stubbings. "Deriving ethnic names from pottery styles is one of the most deplorable habits in archaeology," F. J. Tritsch asserted in 1974. "We cheerfully speak of the 'Minyans' when we mean a population that uses pottery we call 'Minyan'," although he was mistaken in saying that the Greeks themselves never mention the 'Minyans' as a tribe or as a people.

=== Excavations ===
When John L. Caskey of the American School of Classical Studies at Athens outlined the results of his excavations at Lerna from 1952 up until 1958, he stated that the hallmarks of Middle Helladic culture (i.e. Gray Minyan ware and the fast potter's wheel) may have originated from Early Helladic III. Caskey also stated that Lerna (along with settlements at Tiryns, Asine in the Argolid, Agios Kosmas near Athens, and perhaps Corinth) was destroyed at the end of Early Helladic II. He suggested that the invaders of Early Helladic II settlements may have been Greeks speaking a prototype of the later Greek language. However, there is evidence of destruction at the end of the Early Helladic III period at Korakou (near Corinth) and Eutresis in Boeotia. Nevertheless, Caskey found the Middle Helladic people to be the direct ancestors of the Myceneans and later Greeks. (Note: According to Hood: "In an article on 'The Early Helladic Period in the Argolid' (Hesperia 29 (1960), 285 ff.), J. Caskey outlines some of the more important results of his excavations at Lerna from 1952–1958: The settlement here (including the palatial 'House of the Tiles') was destroyed by fire, apparently by invaders, at the end of Early Helladic II (Lerna III). The Early Helladic III settlement (Lerna IV) belonged to these invaders. It was from this Early Helladic III horizon that the embossed bone plaque and the clay anchor ornaments came (Hesperia 23 (1954), 22 pl. 9 g; 25 (1956), pl. 47 1-p; 26. (1957), pl. 42 e). It seems that the Middle Helladic period (Lerna V) began without any violent break, although it was marked by the appearance of new features, such as matt-painted pottery and the custom of burial inside the settlement. What is most important is the fact that certain features, which have hitherto been regarded as hallmarks of Middle Helladic, notably Gray Minyan ware and the use of the fast potter's wheel, had their origins in Early Helladic III. Caskey notes that the settlements at Tiryns and Asine in the Argolid, Ayios Kosmas near Athens, and perhaps Corinth, were all apparently destroyed at the end of Early Helladic II like Lerna. It is suggested that the invaders responsible for the destruction of these Early Helladic II settlements may have spoken a prototype of the later Greek language-may, that is, in a general sense have been the Greeks. There is, however, evidence for another destruction at the knd of the Early Helladic III period at Korakou (near Corinth) and Eutresis in Boeotia.") (Note: Caskey concludes: "Elements that have been taken exclusively as marks of the Middle Bronze Age, gray ware of Minyan character and the potter's wheel for example, are now seen to have origins in the chronological period of Early Helladic III. K. Miiller was unable to find a clear break between Early Helladic and Middle Helladic at Tiryns. Destruction of Asine, Zygouries, and Aghios Kosmas at the end of Early Helladic III is no longer attested if the relative dating outlined above is valid. There was indeed a layer of ashes over debris of E.H. III at Korakou and, correspondingly, at Eutresis; elsewhere the evidence of disaster at this time is exceedingly meager. It would be premature, and not within the scope of this paper, to discuss the questions of race and migration that are implicit in the proposals here advanced. Belief that the Middle Helladic people were ancestors of the "Mycenaeans," and hence of the later Greeks, is not affected. The question is, rather, whether the people of Early Helladic III may not have been closely akin to the Middle Helladics and thus also of direct or indirect parentage to the Mycenaean Greeks. Pre-Greek place names, the significance of which has been carefully considered by Blegen and others," would seem in any case to belong with the cultural stage which we here call Early Helladic II.")

Although scholars today agree that the Mycenean Greeks descend from the "Minyans" of the Middle Helladic period, they question Caskey's suggestion that (proto-Greek) Indo-European invaders destroyed Early Helladic II settlements throughout Greece. (Note: According to Dietrich: "Such features include the destruction of older settlements, like Eutresis and Central Greece, the foundation of new settlements, the expansion of cist-grave burials, and the "systematization of the megaron-type of houses". At the same time the so-called Grey Minyan Ware began to appear throughout Greece, and this distinctive type of pottery was naturally coupled with the arrival from the north of invading Indo-European tribes together with their culture and religion. But no single item on this list is entirely novel, in the sense that it possessed no forerunners in previous periods, so that inevitably some doubt attaches to the theory of a mainland invasion by an Indo-European or any other race at the beginning of Middle Helladic...It can be said, therefore, that there are no convincing archaeological grounds for supposing an invasion of Greece in Early Helladic III. It is possible, of course, that migratory movements into this region left no recognizable archaeological traces; but this is a dangerous and unworkable argument. It seems best then to abandon the belief in a large scale incursion accompanied by a clear and sudden cultural break.") In fact, the layers of destruction Caskey found at Lerna and Tiryns were ultimately attributed to fire. Moreover, there are indications of Early Helladic II culture being directly succeeded by Early Helladic III culture. (Note: According to the lecture notes of Jeremy B. Rutter, Chairman of the Classics Department at Dartmouth College: "At Lerna and Tiryns in the Argolid, this cultural assemblage is found stratified directly above settlements of the Korakou (EH IIA) culture which had been destroyed by fire. Here and elsewhere in the Argolid and Corinthia, there is no intervening "Lefkandi I" (EH IIB) cultural stage. In Laconia and Messenia in the southern Peloponnese, there is no evidence for either the "Lefkandi I" or the Tiryns cultures (except for a very late EH III assemblage recently published from the basal levels at Nichoria and from the Deriziotis Aloni site near Ano Englianos), despite the fact that these areas have been quite thoroughly explored. Rather, an early Middle Helladic cultural assemblage appears to succeed the Korakou culture either directly or after a period of abandonment of undetermined duration at sites such as Ayios Stephanos (Laconia) and Voïdhokoilia (Messenia). At Kolonna on Aegina, remains of the Tiryns culture are stratified immediately above a late phase of the EH II period whose architecture is comparable to that of Lerna III of the Korakou culture (a probably fortified settlement within which is the "White House", a 20 x 9 m. version of the "Corridor House" type best represented by the House of the Tiles at Lerna) but whose pottery includes a few pieces typical of the "Lefkandi I" assemblage of central Greece alongside a mass of vases characteristic of the EH IIA Korakou culture.") Overall, this indicates that the progenitors and founders of "Minyan culture" were an autochthonous group. (Note: According to Korrés: "The Proto-Greeks buried inside the pithoi of the MH tumulus were of Mediterranean-Aegean origin, as is indicated by the burial customs. They were autochthonous, not immigrated from the northern Balkans, as has been supported by those believing in the theory of the arrival in waves of Kurgan peoples. No burial-pithoi are known from regions to the north of Leucas, which confirms A. Häusler's conclusion that there is no evidence for the arrival of Kurgan people anywhere in Greece.")

== See also ==
- Graïke
- Graia
- Ogyges
- Pelasgians
- Pre-Greek substrate
- Chloris
- Persephone
