= List of minor planets: 463001–464000 =

The following is a partial list of minor planets, running from minor-planet number 463001 through 464000, inclusive. The primary data for this and other partial lists is based on JPL's "Small-Body Orbital Elements" and data available from the Minor Planet Center. Critical list information is also provided by the MPC, unless otherwise specified from Lowell Observatory. A detailed description of the table's columns and additional sources are given on the main page including a complete list of every page in this series, and a statistical break-up on the dynamical classification of minor planets.

Also see the summary list of all named bodies in numerical and alphabetical order, and the corresponding naming citations for the number range of this particular list. New namings may only be added to this list after official publication, as the preannouncement of names is condemned by the Working Group for Small Bodies Nomenclature of the International Astronomical Union.

Near-Earth obj.	MBA (inner)	MBA (outer)	Centaur
Mars-crosser	MBA (middle)	Jupiter trojan	Trans-Neptunian obj.
Unclassified

== 463001–463100 ==
Designation			Discovery			Properties		Ref
Permanent	Provisional	Named after	Date	Site	Discoverer(s)	Category	Diam.	Ref
463001	2011 FF_{119}	—	March 8, 2005	Mount Lemmon	Mount Lemmon Survey	VER	2.8 km	MPC · JPL
463002	2011 FL_{134}	—	September 6, 2008	Mount Lemmon	Mount Lemmon Survey	·	1.6 km	MPC · JPL
463003	2011 FZ_{134}	—	September 26, 2008	Kitt Peak	Spacewatch	·	2.0 km	MPC · JPL
463004	2011 FT_{139}	—	November 21, 2009	Catalina	CSS	·	1.7 km	MPC · JPL
463005	2011 FB_{149}	—	September 26, 2008	Kitt Peak	Spacewatch	·	3.0 km	MPC · JPL
463006	2011 FZ_{150}	—	February 1, 2006	Catalina	CSS	BRA	1.9 km	MPC · JPL
463007	2011 FV_{151}	—	October 11, 2004	Kitt Peak	Spacewatch	H	520 m	MPC · JPL
463008	2011 FA_{158}	—	April 13, 2002	Kitt Peak	Spacewatch	·	2.2 km	MPC · JPL
463009	2011 GE_{10}	—	March 11, 2011	Mount Lemmon	Mount Lemmon Survey	·	2.1 km	MPC · JPL
463010	2011 GX_{12}	—	September 27, 2008	Mount Lemmon	Mount Lemmon Survey	VER	1.9 km	MPC · JPL
463011	2011 GT_{14}	—	September 4, 2007	Catalina	CSS	·	2.7 km	MPC · JPL
463012	2011 GV_{17}	—	May 24, 2001	Apache Point	SDSS	·	2.1 km	MPC · JPL
463013	2011 GZ_{27}	—	April 2, 2011	Mount Lemmon	Mount Lemmon Survey	·	390 m	MPC · JPL
463014	2011 GO_{29}	—	September 2, 2008	Kitt Peak	Spacewatch	·	1.8 km	MPC · JPL
463015	2011 GU_{33}	—	August 10, 2007	Kitt Peak	Spacewatch	·	2.0 km	MPC · JPL
463016	2011 GB_{37}	—	January 7, 2010	Kitt Peak	Spacewatch	·	2.9 km	MPC · JPL
463017	2011 GV_{38}	—	March 2, 2006	Mount Lemmon	Mount Lemmon Survey	·	1.9 km	MPC · JPL
463018	2011 GJ_{49}	—	March 17, 2010	WISE	WISE	·	3.2 km	MPC · JPL
463019	2011 GB_{59}	—	September 11, 2007	Catalina	CSS	·	3.3 km	MPC · JPL
463020	2011 GN_{62}	—	February 25, 2011	Mount Lemmon	Mount Lemmon Survey	·	2.7 km	MPC · JPL
463021	2011 GP_{62}	—	October 1, 2008	Mount Lemmon	Mount Lemmon Survey	·	2.6 km	MPC · JPL
463022	2011 GE_{63}	—	April 12, 2011	Catalina	CSS	·	3.0 km	MPC · JPL
463023	2011 GR_{63}	—	January 10, 2010	Mount Lemmon	Mount Lemmon Survey	·	2.4 km	MPC · JPL
463024	2011 GL_{65}	—	May 25, 2006	Mount Lemmon	Mount Lemmon Survey	H	400 m	MPC · JPL
463025	2011 GK_{68}	—	May 8, 2006	Kitt Peak	Spacewatch	·	1.9 km	MPC · JPL
463026	2011 GT_{73}	—	March 26, 2011	Kitt Peak	Spacewatch	·	2.8 km	MPC · JPL
463027	2011 GQ_{74}	—	September 14, 2007	Mount Lemmon	Mount Lemmon Survey	·	1.6 km	MPC · JPL
463028	2011 GM_{76}	—	March 26, 2011	Mount Lemmon	Mount Lemmon Survey	·	3.0 km	MPC · JPL
463029	2011 GR_{84}	—	April 6, 2011	Kitt Peak	Spacewatch	HYG	2.7 km	MPC · JPL
463030	2011 HV_{1}	—	September 7, 2008	Mount Lemmon	Mount Lemmon Survey	·	2.4 km	MPC · JPL
463031	2011 HW_{2}	—	April 13, 2011	Mount Lemmon	Mount Lemmon Survey	·	2.5 km	MPC · JPL
463032	2011 HH_{8}	—	April 28, 2011	Kitt Peak	Spacewatch	H	610 m	MPC · JPL
463033	2011 HW_{8}	—	November 9, 2008	Mount Lemmon	Mount Lemmon Survey	·	3.2 km	MPC · JPL
463034	2011 HR_{9}	—	April 10, 2010	WISE	WISE	LIX	3.5 km	MPC · JPL
463035	2011 HW_{11}	—	April 22, 2011	Kitt Peak	Spacewatch	·	3.3 km	MPC · JPL
463036	2011 HY_{12}	—	April 23, 2011	Kitt Peak	Spacewatch	·	2.8 km	MPC · JPL
463037	2011 HK_{14}	—	February 9, 2005	Mount Lemmon	Mount Lemmon Survey	·	2.0 km	MPC · JPL
463038	2011 HE_{19}	—	March 4, 2005	Mount Lemmon	Mount Lemmon Survey	·	2.8 km	MPC · JPL
463039	2011 HJ_{26}	—	September 22, 2008	Mount Lemmon	Mount Lemmon Survey	EOS	1.8 km	MPC · JPL
463040	2011 HZ_{28}	—	January 13, 2010	Mount Lemmon	Mount Lemmon Survey	·	3.6 km	MPC · JPL
463041	2011 HF_{31}	—	March 24, 2011	Kitt Peak	Spacewatch	·	2.5 km	MPC · JPL
463042	2011 HX_{33}	—	April 28, 2010	WISE	WISE	·	3.4 km	MPC · JPL
463043	2011 HN_{35}	—	April 25, 2010	WISE	WISE	·	3.6 km	MPC · JPL
463044	2011 HB_{36}	—	April 28, 2011	Socorro	LINEAR	H	680 m	MPC · JPL
463045	2011 HW_{38}	—	November 1, 2008	Mount Lemmon	Mount Lemmon Survey	·	2.8 km	MPC · JPL
463046	2011 HS_{39}	—	April 23, 2011	Kitt Peak	Spacewatch	H	490 m	MPC · JPL
463047	2011 HW_{39}	—	March 28, 2011	Catalina	CSS	·	2.3 km	MPC · JPL
463048	2011 HZ_{39}	—	May 22, 2006	Kitt Peak	Spacewatch	·	2.0 km	MPC · JPL
463049	2011 HY_{40}	—	January 7, 2010	Kitt Peak	Spacewatch	·	2.6 km	MPC · JPL
463050	2011 HC_{44}	—	April 1, 2011	Kitt Peak	Spacewatch	·	3.1 km	MPC · JPL
463051	2011 HF_{45}	—	February 14, 2010	Mount Lemmon	Mount Lemmon Survey	·	2.5 km	MPC · JPL
463052	2011 HK_{52}	—	February 17, 2010	Kitt Peak	Spacewatch	·	3.8 km	MPC · JPL
463053	2011 HC_{54}	—	May 11, 2010	WISE	WISE	·	4.3 km	MPC · JPL
463054	2011 HN_{54}	—	May 25, 2006	Mount Lemmon	Mount Lemmon Survey	·	1.7 km	MPC · JPL
463055	2011 HC_{55}	—	May 20, 2006	Kitt Peak	Spacewatch	·	2.9 km	MPC · JPL
463056	2011 HN_{60}	—	April 23, 2011	Kitt Peak	Spacewatch	·	5.2 km	MPC · JPL
463057	2011 HM_{63}	—	April 21, 2006	Kitt Peak	Spacewatch	·	1.9 km	MPC · JPL
463058	2011 HC_{64}	—	October 6, 2008	Mount Lemmon	Mount Lemmon Survey	EOS	1.7 km	MPC · JPL
463059	2011 HB_{65}	—	October 26, 2009	Kitt Peak	Spacewatch	·	1.9 km	MPC · JPL
463060	2011 HQ_{86}	—	February 9, 2005	Kitt Peak	Spacewatch	·	1.9 km	MPC · JPL
463061	2011 HV_{87}	—	February 25, 2011	Mount Lemmon	Mount Lemmon Survey	·	2.0 km	MPC · JPL
463062	2011 HZ_{88}	—	March 9, 2005	Mount Lemmon	Mount Lemmon Survey	EOS	1.6 km	MPC · JPL
463063	2011 HE_{90}	—	March 13, 2010	WISE	WISE	·	1.9 km	MPC · JPL
463064	2011 HZ_{91}	—	March 2, 2011	Mount Lemmon	Mount Lemmon Survey	·	2.7 km	MPC · JPL
463065	2011 HO_{95}	—	February 13, 2004	Kitt Peak	Spacewatch	·	3.3 km	MPC · JPL
463066	2011 HD_{97}	—	April 13, 2011	Kitt Peak	Spacewatch	·	2.6 km	MPC · JPL
463067	2011 JM_{3}	—	May 5, 2011	Catalina	CSS	H	680 m	MPC · JPL
463068	2011 JK_{7}	—	September 22, 2008	Kitt Peak	Spacewatch	·	2.5 km	MPC · JPL
463069	2011 JS_{12}	—	November 1, 2007	Mount Lemmon	Mount Lemmon Survey	·	4.0 km	MPC · JPL
463070	2011 JE_{15}	—	April 20, 2006	Kitt Peak	Spacewatch	·	2.0 km	MPC · JPL
463071	2011 JY_{30}	—	April 10, 2005	Kitt Peak	Spacewatch	·	3.0 km	MPC · JPL
463072	2011 JK_{31}	—	September 25, 2008	Mount Lemmon	Mount Lemmon Survey	VER	2.7 km	MPC · JPL
463073	2011 JL_{31}	—	April 28, 2011	Kitt Peak	Spacewatch	VER	3.2 km	MPC · JPL
463074	2011 JT_{31}	—	April 16, 2010	WISE	WISE	·	2.9 km	MPC · JPL
463075	2011 KF_{31}	—	May 27, 2000	Socorro	LINEAR	·	3.0 km	MPC · JPL
463076	2011 KD_{37}	—	April 16, 2010	WISE	WISE	·	3.3 km	MPC · JPL
463077	2011 LP_{14}	—	October 9, 2007	Mount Lemmon	Mount Lemmon Survey	T_{j} (2.97)	4.1 km	MPC · JPL
463078	2011 LW_{17}	—	May 6, 2010	WISE	WISE	·	2.8 km	MPC · JPL
463079	2011 LS_{23}	—	April 10, 2005	Mount Lemmon	Mount Lemmon Survey	·	2.5 km	MPC · JPL
463080	2011 OG_{10}	—	June 12, 2011	Mount Lemmon	Mount Lemmon Survey	H	650 m	MPC · JPL
463081	2011 OA_{31}	—	May 4, 2010	Kitt Peak	Spacewatch	·	4.8 km	MPC · JPL
463082	2011 PD_{1}	—	August 4, 2011	Siding Spring	SSS	H	590 m	MPC · JPL
463083	2011 QT_{12}	—	August 24, 2011	XuYi	PMO NEO Survey Program	H	650 m	MPC · JPL
463084	2011 SU_{90}	—	September 12, 2004	Kitt Peak	Spacewatch	·	530 m	MPC · JPL
463085	2011 SA_{175}	—	December 1, 2008	Kitt Peak	Spacewatch	·	470 m	MPC · JPL
463086	2011 SP_{178}	—	September 26, 2011	Kitt Peak	Spacewatch	·	590 m	MPC · JPL
463087	2011 SH_{182}	—	March 20, 2002	Kitt Peak	Deep Ecliptic Survey	·	780 m	MPC · JPL
463088	2011 SR_{191}	—	September 24, 2011	Mount Lemmon	Mount Lemmon Survey	3:2	5.4 km	MPC · JPL
463089	2011 SZ_{216}	—	March 2, 2009	Kitt Peak	Spacewatch	·	790 m	MPC · JPL
463090	2011 SF_{223}	—	May 9, 2010	Mount Lemmon	Mount Lemmon Survey	·	740 m	MPC · JPL
463091	2011 SV_{273}	—	November 3, 2004	Anderson Mesa	LONEOS	·	1.1 km	MPC · JPL
463092	2011 TD_{17}	—	October 10, 2001	Palomar	NEAT	·	570 m	MPC · JPL
463093	2011 UW_{8}	—	October 18, 2011	Mount Lemmon	Mount Lemmon Survey	·	810 m	MPC · JPL
463094	2011 UX_{16}	—	December 1, 2008	Mount Lemmon	Mount Lemmon Survey	·	730 m	MPC · JPL
463095	2011 UK_{18}	—	October 19, 2011	Kitt Peak	Spacewatch	·	600 m	MPC · JPL
463096	2011 UH_{22}	—	November 4, 2004	Kitt Peak	Spacewatch	·	850 m	MPC · JPL
463097	2011 UT_{24}	—	December 15, 2004	Kitt Peak	Spacewatch	·	760 m	MPC · JPL
463098	2011 UC_{28}	—	January 17, 2009	Kitt Peak	Spacewatch	·	520 m	MPC · JPL
463099	2011 UW_{30}	—	October 18, 2011	Mount Lemmon	Mount Lemmon Survey	·	730 m	MPC · JPL
463100	2011 UV_{45}	—	September 29, 2011	Mount Lemmon	Mount Lemmon Survey	·	730 m	MPC · JPL

== 463101–463200 ==
back to top

Designation			Discovery			Properties		Ref
Permanent	Provisional	Named after	Date	Site	Discoverer(s)	Category	Diam.	Ref
463101	2011 UU_{46}	—	December 7, 2008	Mount Lemmon	Mount Lemmon Survey	·	640 m	MPC · JPL
463102	2011 UG_{62}	—	September 27, 2000	Kitt Peak	Spacewatch	·	800 m	MPC · JPL
463103	2011 UP_{66}	—	December 31, 2008	Catalina	CSS	·	680 m	MPC · JPL
463104	2011 UN_{67}	—	September 20, 2011	Kitt Peak	Spacewatch	·	520 m	MPC · JPL
463105	2011 UV_{88}	—	August 25, 2001	Kitt Peak	Spacewatch	·	700 m	MPC · JPL
463106	2011 UU_{96}	—	November 4, 2004	Kitt Peak	Spacewatch	·	550 m	MPC · JPL
463107	2011 UD_{117}	—	October 14, 2001	Kitt Peak	Spacewatch	·	500 m	MPC · JPL
463108	2011 UX_{119}	—	November 20, 2004	Kitt Peak	Spacewatch	·	700 m	MPC · JPL
463109	2011 UP_{127}	—	October 20, 2011	Kitt Peak	Spacewatch	·	730 m	MPC · JPL
463110	2011 UN_{153}	—	October 22, 2011	Kitt Peak	Spacewatch	(2076)	650 m	MPC · JPL
463111	2011 UY_{154}	—	October 23, 2011	Kitt Peak	Spacewatch	·	710 m	MPC · JPL
463112	2011 UN_{157}	—	December 30, 2008	Mount Lemmon	Mount Lemmon Survey	·	620 m	MPC · JPL
463113	2011 UE_{159}	—	January 2, 2009	Kitt Peak	Spacewatch	·	670 m	MPC · JPL
463114	2011 UB_{203}	—	February 2, 2009	Kitt Peak	Spacewatch	·	520 m	MPC · JPL
463115	2011 UM_{247}	—	September 24, 2011	Mount Lemmon	Mount Lemmon Survey	·	790 m	MPC · JPL
463116	2011 UR_{251}	—	November 3, 2004	Kitt Peak	Spacewatch	·	540 m	MPC · JPL
463117	2011 UU_{260}	—	October 9, 2004	Kitt Peak	Spacewatch	·	540 m	MPC · JPL
463118	2011 UD_{263}	—	October 21, 2011	Mount Lemmon	Mount Lemmon Survey	NYS	890 m	MPC · JPL
463119	2011 UX_{264}	—	September 11, 2001	Socorro	LINEAR	·	630 m	MPC · JPL
463120	2011 UL_{278}	—	October 25, 2011	Kitt Peak	Spacewatch	·	2.2 km	MPC · JPL
463121	2011 UJ_{280}	—	February 1, 2009	Kitt Peak	Spacewatch	·	810 m	MPC · JPL
463122	2011 UP_{303}	—	September 23, 2011	Mount Lemmon	Mount Lemmon Survey	·	520 m	MPC · JPL
463123	2011 UE_{336}	—	September 27, 2008	Mount Lemmon	Mount Lemmon Survey	·	950 m	MPC · JPL
463124	2011 UR_{356}	—	October 20, 2011	Kitt Peak	Spacewatch	·	530 m	MPC · JPL
463125	2011 UL_{394}	—	January 29, 2009	Kitt Peak	Spacewatch	·	640 m	MPC · JPL
463126	2011 VB_{2}	—	March 10, 1999	Kitt Peak	Spacewatch	·	590 m	MPC · JPL
463127	2011 VM_{6}	—	September 17, 2004	Kitt Peak	Spacewatch	(2076)	570 m	MPC · JPL
463128	2011 VV_{13}	—	October 20, 2011	Mount Lemmon	Mount Lemmon Survey	V	550 m	MPC · JPL
463129	2011 VF_{14}	—	October 29, 2011	Kitt Peak	Spacewatch	·	620 m	MPC · JPL
463130	2011 WP_{10}	—	January 31, 2009	Mount Lemmon	Mount Lemmon Survey	·	580 m	MPC · JPL
463131	2011 WX_{13}	—	February 20, 2009	Mount Lemmon	Mount Lemmon Survey	·	640 m	MPC · JPL
463132	2011 WS_{44}	—	November 23, 2011	Mount Lemmon	Mount Lemmon Survey	MAS	550 m	MPC · JPL
463133	2011 WG_{50}	—	January 13, 2005	Socorro	LINEAR	·	1.7 km	MPC · JPL
463134	2011 WJ_{55}	—	January 18, 2009	Kitt Peak	Spacewatch	·	560 m	MPC · JPL
463135	2011 WM_{65}	—	November 16, 2011	Kitt Peak	Spacewatch	·	970 m	MPC · JPL
463136	2011 WQ_{88}	—	December 10, 2004	Kitt Peak	Spacewatch	·	670 m	MPC · JPL
463137	2011 WZ_{90}	—	December 20, 2004	Mount Lemmon	Mount Lemmon Survey	·	1.1 km	MPC · JPL
463138	2011 WZ_{108}	—	December 11, 2004	Kitt Peak	Spacewatch	·	930 m	MPC · JPL
463139	2011 WS_{142}	—	November 23, 2011	Kitt Peak	Spacewatch	·	770 m	MPC · JPL
463140	2011 YP_{12}	—	January 15, 2005	Kitt Peak	Spacewatch	·	850 m	MPC · JPL
463141	2011 YT_{20}	—	December 27, 2011	Mount Lemmon	Mount Lemmon Survey	·	920 m	MPC · JPL
463142	2011 YM_{23}	—	October 15, 2007	Kitt Peak	Spacewatch	·	880 m	MPC · JPL
463143	2011 YK_{26}	—	December 25, 2011	Kitt Peak	Spacewatch	·	1.4 km	MPC · JPL
463144	2011 YP_{30}	—	December 25, 2011	Mount Lemmon	Mount Lemmon Survey	·	880 m	MPC · JPL
463145	2011 YR_{37}	—	December 26, 2011	Kitt Peak	Spacewatch	V	530 m	MPC · JPL
463146	2011 YO_{41}	—	November 2, 2007	Kitt Peak	Spacewatch	·	950 m	MPC · JPL
463147	2011 YV_{45}	—	December 27, 2011	Kitt Peak	Spacewatch	·	1.2 km	MPC · JPL
463148	2011 YD_{58}	—	November 28, 2011	Mount Lemmon	Mount Lemmon Survey	·	760 m	MPC · JPL
463149	2011 YK_{61}	—	March 19, 2009	Kitt Peak	Spacewatch	·	920 m	MPC · JPL
463150	2011 YE_{70}	—	November 18, 2007	Mount Lemmon	Mount Lemmon Survey	·	1.0 km	MPC · JPL
463151	2011 YD_{72}	—	February 14, 2005	Kitt Peak	Spacewatch	·	950 m	MPC · JPL
463152	2011 YX_{73}	—	November 26, 2003	Kitt Peak	Spacewatch	·	1 km	MPC · JPL
463153	2012 AA_{2}	—	December 24, 2011	Mount Lemmon	Mount Lemmon Survey	·	1.1 km	MPC · JPL
463154	2012 AR_{2}	—	October 9, 2007	Kitt Peak	Spacewatch	NYS	850 m	MPC · JPL
463155	2012 AY_{6}	—	February 4, 2009	Mount Lemmon	Mount Lemmon Survey	PHO	1.0 km	MPC · JPL
463156	2012 AC_{22}	—	December 27, 2011	Kitt Peak	Spacewatch	·	720 m	MPC · JPL
463157	2012 AR_{22}	—	November 26, 2011	Mount Lemmon	Mount Lemmon Survey	·	900 m	MPC · JPL
463158	2012 BG_{3}	—	October 15, 2007	Kitt Peak	Spacewatch	·	790 m	MPC · JPL
463159	2012 BU_{3}	—	March 8, 2005	Mount Lemmon	Mount Lemmon Survey	·	990 m	MPC · JPL
463160	2012 BZ_{4}	—	December 25, 2011	Mount Lemmon	Mount Lemmon Survey	·	1 km	MPC · JPL
463161	2012 BP_{11}	—	December 27, 2011	Mount Lemmon	Mount Lemmon Survey	NYS	1.2 km	MPC · JPL
463162	2012 BX_{14}	—	January 18, 2012	Kitt Peak	Spacewatch	·	1.0 km	MPC · JPL
463163	2012 BJ_{19}	—	March 24, 2009	Mount Lemmon	Mount Lemmon Survey	·	1.1 km	MPC · JPL
463164	2012 BP_{19}	—	December 29, 2011	Mount Lemmon	Mount Lemmon Survey	·	1.5 km	MPC · JPL
463165	2012 BE_{28}	—	January 21, 2012	Haleakala	Pan-STARRS 1	NYS	1.0 km	MPC · JPL
463166	2012 BN_{40}	—	October 10, 2007	Catalina	CSS	·	1.0 km	MPC · JPL
463167	2012 BG_{47}	—	December 30, 2007	Mount Lemmon	Mount Lemmon Survey	·	1.1 km	MPC · JPL
463168	2012 BY_{51}	—	November 24, 2003	Kitt Peak	Spacewatch	·	950 m	MPC · JPL
463169	2012 BR_{52}	—	January 21, 2012	Kitt Peak	Spacewatch	·	840 m	MPC · JPL
463170	2012 BU_{52}	—	January 21, 2012	Kitt Peak	Spacewatch	·	1.2 km	MPC · JPL
463171	2012 BW_{70}	—	January 21, 2012	Kitt Peak	Spacewatch	·	940 m	MPC · JPL
463172	2012 BA_{71}	—	October 12, 2007	Kitt Peak	Spacewatch	MAS	500 m	MPC · JPL
463173	2012 BN_{76}	—	February 9, 2008	Mount Lemmon	Mount Lemmon Survey	PHO	1.0 km	MPC · JPL
463174	2012 BU_{76}	—	February 12, 2008	Catalina	CSS	·	2.4 km	MPC · JPL
463175	2012 BE_{82}	—	November 15, 2007	Mount Lemmon	Mount Lemmon Survey	V	540 m	MPC · JPL
463176	2012 BM_{93}	—	November 7, 2007	Kitt Peak	Spacewatch	·	780 m	MPC · JPL
463177	2012 BK_{94}	—	January 27, 2012	Mount Lemmon	Mount Lemmon Survey	·	1.1 km	MPC · JPL
463178	2012 BM_{102}	—	November 6, 2007	Kitt Peak	Spacewatch	·	1.0 km	MPC · JPL
463179	2012 BG_{105}	—	December 4, 2007	Kitt Peak	Spacewatch	·	750 m	MPC · JPL
463180	2012 BS_{106}	—	December 5, 2007	Mount Lemmon	Mount Lemmon Survey	NYS	900 m	MPC · JPL
463181	2012 BE_{107}	—	December 31, 2007	Mount Lemmon	Mount Lemmon Survey	·	1.0 km	MPC · JPL
463182	2012 BZ_{107}	—	January 21, 2012	Kitt Peak	Spacewatch	PHO	1.1 km	MPC · JPL
463183	2012 BL_{109}	—	December 5, 2007	Kitt Peak	Spacewatch	MAS	530 m	MPC · JPL
463184	2012 BX_{113}	—	November 2, 2007	Kitt Peak	Spacewatch	MAS	550 m	MPC · JPL
463185	2012 BC_{117}	—	December 15, 2007	Kitt Peak	Spacewatch	·	1.2 km	MPC · JPL
463186	2012 BQ_{119}	—	January 10, 2008	Kitt Peak	Spacewatch	·	670 m	MPC · JPL
463187	2012 BC_{120}	—	October 29, 2003	Kitt Peak	Spacewatch	·	980 m	MPC · JPL
463188	2012 BQ_{120}	—	February 18, 2008	Catalina	CSS	·	2.0 km	MPC · JPL
463189	2012 BX_{120}	—	January 29, 2012	Catalina	CSS	·	1.4 km	MPC · JPL
463190	2012 BL_{122}	—	January 30, 2012	Kitt Peak	Spacewatch	·	1.1 km	MPC · JPL
463191	2012 BA_{126}	—	January 20, 2012	Kitt Peak	Spacewatch	V	730 m	MPC · JPL
463192	2012 BB_{128}	—	August 12, 2006	Palomar	NEAT	·	800 m	MPC · JPL
463193	2012 BD_{130}	—	January 13, 2008	Kitt Peak	Spacewatch	·	1 km	MPC · JPL
463194	2012 BA_{132}	—	January 21, 2012	Catalina	CSS	·	1.7 km	MPC · JPL
463195	2012 BV_{140}	—	February 3, 2009	Kitt Peak	Spacewatch	·	780 m	MPC · JPL
463196	2012 BB_{152}	—	August 19, 2006	Kitt Peak	Spacewatch	·	1.5 km	MPC · JPL
463197	2012 BC_{152}	—	April 2, 2005	Mount Lemmon	Mount Lemmon Survey	NYS	990 m	MPC · JPL
463198	2012 CO_{8}	—	March 31, 2009	Mount Lemmon	Mount Lemmon Survey	·	1.3 km	MPC · JPL
463199	2012 CL_{9}	—	January 26, 2012	Mount Lemmon	Mount Lemmon Survey	·	870 m	MPC · JPL
463200	2012 CP_{15}	—	December 30, 2007	Mount Lemmon	Mount Lemmon Survey	·	930 m	MPC · JPL

== 463201–463300 ==
back to top

Designation			Discovery			Properties		Ref
Permanent	Provisional	Named after	Date	Site	Discoverer(s)	Category	Diam.	Ref
463201	2012 CH_{18}	—	March 11, 2005	Mount Lemmon	Mount Lemmon Survey	·	970 m	MPC · JPL
463202	2012 CG_{25}	—	September 21, 2003	Palomar	NEAT	·	790 m	MPC · JPL
463203	2012 CO_{26}	—	January 26, 2012	Mount Lemmon	Mount Lemmon Survey	·	1.3 km	MPC · JPL
463204	2012 CO_{34}	—	April 2, 2009	Kitt Peak	Spacewatch	(2076)	740 m	MPC · JPL
463205	2012 CZ_{39}	—	October 18, 2003	Kitt Peak	Spacewatch	NYS	1.1 km	MPC · JPL
463206	2012 CJ_{42}	—	October 16, 2006	Kitt Peak	Spacewatch	·	1.1 km	MPC · JPL
463207	2012 CQ_{43}	—	February 9, 2005	Mount Lemmon	Mount Lemmon Survey	·	860 m	MPC · JPL
463208	2012 CH_{47}	—	February 13, 2012	Kitt Peak	Spacewatch	·	1.4 km	MPC · JPL
463209	2012 CJ_{47}	—	February 8, 2008	Mount Lemmon	Mount Lemmon Survey	·	1.5 km	MPC · JPL
463210	2012 CA_{50}	—	December 17, 2007	Kitt Peak	Spacewatch	·	1.6 km	MPC · JPL
463211	2012 CW_{50}	—	December 19, 2007	Kitt Peak	Spacewatch	·	910 m	MPC · JPL
463212	2012 DY_{5}	—	July 26, 2006	Palomar	NEAT	·	1.3 km	MPC · JPL
463213	2012 DX_{7}	—	May 10, 2005	Kitt Peak	Spacewatch	NYS	920 m	MPC · JPL
463214	2012 DD_{18}	—	February 11, 2012	Mount Lemmon	Mount Lemmon Survey	·	940 m	MPC · JPL
463215	2012 DY_{28}	—	February 22, 2012	Kitt Peak	Spacewatch	·	1.3 km	MPC · JPL
463216	2012 DU_{30}	—	February 23, 2012	Catalina	CSS	AMO	770 m	MPC · JPL
463217	2012 DQ_{34}	—	December 16, 2007	Mount Lemmon	Mount Lemmon Survey	V	760 m	MPC · JPL
463218	2012 DW_{34}	—	February 9, 2008	Kitt Peak	Spacewatch	·	880 m	MPC · JPL
463219	2012 DN_{39}	—	February 23, 2012	Kitt Peak	Spacewatch	·	1.5 km	MPC · JPL
463220	2012 DK_{45}	—	February 28, 2008	Mount Lemmon	Mount Lemmon Survey	·	970 m	MPC · JPL
463221	2012 DH_{47}	—	December 16, 2007	Mount Lemmon	Mount Lemmon Survey	·	1.1 km	MPC · JPL
463222	2012 DA_{58}	—	February 10, 2008	Kitt Peak	Spacewatch	·	1.1 km	MPC · JPL
463223	2012 DG_{58}	—	February 22, 2012	Kitt Peak	Spacewatch	·	1.2 km	MPC · JPL
463224	2012 DG_{62}	—	February 22, 2012	Catalina	CSS	·	1.5 km	MPC · JPL
463225	2012 DW_{81}	—	December 30, 2007	Kitt Peak	Spacewatch	MAS	660 m	MPC · JPL
463226	2012 DV_{82}	—	February 21, 2012	Kitt Peak	Spacewatch	·	1.7 km	MPC · JPL
463227	2012 DK_{83}	—	February 23, 2012	Mount Lemmon	Mount Lemmon Survey	NYS	1.1 km	MPC · JPL
463228	2012 DA_{90}	—	January 18, 2012	Kitt Peak	Spacewatch	·	1.3 km	MPC · JPL
463229	2012 DV_{92}	—	January 19, 2008	Kitt Peak	Spacewatch	·	960 m	MPC · JPL
463230	2012 DE_{94}	—	January 21, 2012	Kitt Peak	Spacewatch	·	1.3 km	MPC · JPL
463231	2012 DX_{94}	—	December 4, 2007	Kitt Peak	Spacewatch	NYS	1.1 km	MPC · JPL
463232	2012 DF_{96}	—	March 1, 2008	Kitt Peak	Spacewatch	·	1.2 km	MPC · JPL
463233	2012 EH_{3}	—	March 19, 2001	Socorro	LINEAR	PHO	1.0 km	MPC · JPL
463234	2012 EL_{4}	—	February 22, 2012	Kitt Peak	Spacewatch	·	1.1 km	MPC · JPL
463235	2012 EP_{6}	—	January 19, 2004	Kitt Peak	Spacewatch	NYS	860 m	MPC · JPL
463236	2012 EJ_{9}	—	March 14, 2012	Kitt Peak	Spacewatch	·	1.0 km	MPC · JPL
463237	2012 ES_{11}	—	March 8, 2008	Kitt Peak	Spacewatch	·	1.7 km	MPC · JPL
463238	2012 EO_{16}	—	January 10, 2008	Mount Lemmon	Mount Lemmon Survey	·	1.2 km	MPC · JPL
463239	2012 ED_{17}	—	March 30, 2008	Catalina	CSS	·	1.1 km	MPC · JPL
463240	2012 FC	—	May 14, 2008	Kitt Peak	Spacewatch	·	1.6 km	MPC · JPL
463241	2012 FJ_{5}	—	October 13, 2010	Mount Lemmon	Mount Lemmon Survey	·	1.0 km	MPC · JPL
463242	2012 FK_{13}	—	September 29, 2005	Mount Lemmon	Mount Lemmon Survey	·	1.4 km	MPC · JPL
463243	2012 FV_{17}	—	September 17, 2006	Kitt Peak	Spacewatch	(5)	920 m	MPC · JPL
463244	2012 FX_{28}	—	March 28, 2008	Mount Lemmon	Mount Lemmon Survey	·	930 m	MPC · JPL
463245	2012 FE_{36}	—	March 2, 2008	Mount Lemmon	Mount Lemmon Survey	·	840 m	MPC · JPL
463246	2012 FO_{36}	—	February 22, 2012	Kitt Peak	Spacewatch	·	1.9 km	MPC · JPL
463247	2012 FH_{39}	—	March 1, 2008	Kitt Peak	Spacewatch	·	1.5 km	MPC · JPL
463248	2012 FK_{43}	—	February 26, 2012	Mount Lemmon	Mount Lemmon Survey	·	1.5 km	MPC · JPL
463249	2012 FM_{47}	—	August 28, 2009	Kitt Peak	Spacewatch	·	1.4 km	MPC · JPL
463250	2012 FH_{50}	—	March 10, 2008	Mount Lemmon	Mount Lemmon Survey	·	1.3 km	MPC · JPL
463251	2012 FQ_{58}	—	March 31, 2008	Mount Lemmon	Mount Lemmon Survey	EUN	900 m	MPC · JPL
463252	2012 FJ_{59}	—	March 13, 2008	Kitt Peak	Spacewatch	·	810 m	MPC · JPL
463253	2012 FR_{66}	—	November 6, 2010	Mount Lemmon	Mount Lemmon Survey	·	1.1 km	MPC · JPL
463254	2012 FB_{69}	—	May 5, 2008	Mount Lemmon	Mount Lemmon Survey	·	1.3 km	MPC · JPL
463255	2012 FT_{75}	—	April 14, 2008	Kitt Peak	Spacewatch	·	1.5 km	MPC · JPL
463256	2012 FU_{80}	—	March 13, 2008	Kitt Peak	Spacewatch	·	1.5 km	MPC · JPL
463257	2012 GG_{1}	—	April 2, 2012	Haleakala	Pan-STARRS 1	AMO	700 m	MPC · JPL
463258	2012 GJ_{1}	—	January 3, 2011	Mount Lemmon	Mount Lemmon Survey	·	1.9 km	MPC · JPL
463259	2012 GL_{1}	—	April 10, 2012	Kitt Peak	Spacewatch	·	1.5 km	MPC · JPL
463260	2012 GB_{2}	—	March 4, 2012	Mount Lemmon	Mount Lemmon Survey	EUN	1.1 km	MPC · JPL
463261	2012 GT_{3}	—	September 16, 2009	Mount Lemmon	Mount Lemmon Survey	·	1.9 km	MPC · JPL
463262	2012 GE_{7}	—	July 15, 2004	Siding Spring	SSS	·	1.3 km	MPC · JPL
463263	2012 GO_{7}	—	October 20, 1993	Kitt Peak	Spacewatch	·	1.5 km	MPC · JPL
463264	2012 GQ_{7}	—	May 28, 2008	Mount Lemmon	Mount Lemmon Survey	·	1.2 km	MPC · JPL
463265	2012 GX_{9}	—	January 30, 2008	Mount Lemmon	Mount Lemmon Survey	·	920 m	MPC · JPL
463266	2012 GP_{13}	—	March 27, 2012	Mount Lemmon	Mount Lemmon Survey	·	2.3 km	MPC · JPL
463267	2012 GS_{13}	—	February 9, 2002	Kitt Peak	Spacewatch	·	2.4 km	MPC · JPL
463268	2012 GT_{13}	—	January 11, 2011	Kitt Peak	Spacewatch	·	2.9 km	MPC · JPL
463269	2012 GT_{23}	—	October 21, 1995	Kitt Peak	Spacewatch	·	1.3 km	MPC · JPL
463270	2012 GG_{25}	—	October 10, 2004	Kitt Peak	Spacewatch	·	1.5 km	MPC · JPL
463271	2012 GU_{25}	—	April 11, 2008	Kitt Peak	Spacewatch	·	1.0 km	MPC · JPL
463272	2012 GT_{34}	—	January 19, 2012	Mount Lemmon	Mount Lemmon Survey	MAR	1.6 km	MPC · JPL
463273	2012 GU_{37}	—	November 11, 2009	Kitt Peak	Spacewatch	JUN	1.0 km	MPC · JPL
463274	2012 GK_{38}	—	October 14, 2009	Mount Lemmon	Mount Lemmon Survey	·	1.8 km	MPC · JPL
463275	2012 GS_{38}	—	December 24, 2005	Kitt Peak	Spacewatch	·	2.0 km	MPC · JPL
463276	2012 GW_{38}	—	December 6, 2010	Mount Lemmon	Mount Lemmon Survey	·	2.0 km	MPC · JPL
463277	2012 HW_{7}	—	April 13, 2012	Kitt Peak	Spacewatch	EOS	2.5 km	MPC · JPL
463278	2012 HS_{9}	—	December 10, 2001	Kitt Peak	Spacewatch	·	2.0 km	MPC · JPL
463279	2012 HM_{11}	—	January 2, 2012	Mount Lemmon	Mount Lemmon Survey	·	1.3 km	MPC · JPL
463280	2012 HZ_{11}	—	September 7, 2008	Catalina	CSS	·	1.9 km	MPC · JPL
463281	2012 HN_{14}	—	March 27, 2012	Mount Lemmon	Mount Lemmon Survey	·	1.5 km	MPC · JPL
463282	2012 HR_{15}	—	April 22, 2012	Catalina	CSS	T_{j} (2.92) · APO +1km	1.5 km	MPC · JPL
463283	2012 HS_{16}	—	March 12, 2007	Mount Lemmon	Mount Lemmon Survey	EUN	1.2 km	MPC · JPL
463284	2012 HY_{19}	—	October 15, 2009	Kitt Peak	Spacewatch	·	1.9 km	MPC · JPL
463285	2012 HY_{21}	—	March 27, 2012	Mount Lemmon	Mount Lemmon Survey	MAR	1.3 km	MPC · JPL
463286	2012 HH_{27}	—	April 20, 2012	Kitt Peak	Spacewatch	·	1.7 km	MPC · JPL
463287	2012 HS_{27}	—	September 22, 2009	Mount Lemmon	Mount Lemmon Survey	·	1.4 km	MPC · JPL
463288	2012 HP_{28}	—	January 27, 2007	Mount Lemmon	Mount Lemmon Survey	JUN	930 m	MPC · JPL
463289	2012 HN_{31}	—	March 14, 2007	Mount Lemmon	Mount Lemmon Survey	·	1.7 km	MPC · JPL
463290	2012 HE_{32}	—	October 8, 2004	Kitt Peak	Spacewatch	·	1.3 km	MPC · JPL
463291	2012 HG_{32}	—	April 25, 2012	Kitt Peak	Spacewatch	EOS	2.2 km	MPC · JPL
463292	2012 HR_{33}	—	April 1, 2012	Mount Lemmon	Mount Lemmon Survey	·	1.4 km	MPC · JPL
463293	2012 HO_{40}	—	December 7, 2002	Desert Eagle	W. K. Y. Yeung	·	2.5 km	MPC · JPL
463294	2012 HS_{47}	—	March 19, 2007	Mount Lemmon	Mount Lemmon Survey	NAE	3.0 km	MPC · JPL
463295	2012 HL_{48}	—	December 27, 2006	Mount Lemmon	Mount Lemmon Survey	·	1.4 km	MPC · JPL
463296	2012 HM_{59}	—	May 3, 2008	Mount Lemmon	Mount Lemmon Survey	·	1.4 km	MPC · JPL
463297	2012 HV_{66}	—	September 17, 2009	Kitt Peak	Spacewatch	EUN	1.2 km	MPC · JPL
463298	2012 HX_{70}	—	January 4, 2011	Mount Lemmon	Mount Lemmon Survey	·	1.2 km	MPC · JPL
463299	2012 HQ_{74}	—	September 3, 2010	Mount Lemmon	Mount Lemmon Survey	·	1.6 km	MPC · JPL
463300	2012 HE_{79}	—	May 29, 2008	Mount Lemmon	Mount Lemmon Survey	·	1.9 km	MPC · JPL

== 463301–463400 ==
back to top

Designation			Discovery			Properties		Ref
Permanent	Provisional	Named after	Date	Site	Discoverer(s)	Category	Diam.	Ref
463301	2012 HU_{79}	—	March 26, 2003	Palomar	NEAT	·	1.3 km	MPC · JPL
463302	2012 HS_{80}	—	April 29, 2012	Kitt Peak	Spacewatch	·	1.3 km	MPC · JPL
463303	2012 HY_{82}	—	January 10, 2011	Mount Lemmon	Mount Lemmon Survey	·	2.6 km	MPC · JPL
463304	2012 JA_{7}	—	April 29, 2012	Kitt Peak	Spacewatch	·	1.1 km	MPC · JPL
463305	2012 JE_{9}	—	October 22, 2003	Palomar	NEAT	EOS	2.1 km	MPC · JPL
463306	2012 JF_{11}	—	March 14, 2007	Kitt Peak	Spacewatch	·	2.3 km	MPC · JPL
463307	2012 JD_{20}	—	October 25, 2005	Kitt Peak	Spacewatch	·	1.6 km	MPC · JPL
463308	2012 JK_{20}	—	October 1, 2005	Mount Lemmon	Mount Lemmon Survey	·	1.4 km	MPC · JPL
463309	2012 JO_{22}	—	September 6, 2008	Catalina	CSS	·	2.7 km	MPC · JPL
463310	2012 JU_{24}	—	October 30, 2005	Kitt Peak	Spacewatch	·	1.5 km	MPC · JPL
463311	2012 JO_{26}	—	January 2, 2011	Mount Lemmon	Mount Lemmon Survey	EUN	1.4 km	MPC · JPL
463312	2012 JT_{26}	—	May 14, 2012	Mount Lemmon	Mount Lemmon Survey	·	1.1 km	MPC · JPL
463313	2012 JZ_{27}	—	December 20, 2009	Catalina	CSS	·	3.8 km	MPC · JPL
463314	2012 JD_{30}	—	April 28, 2012	Mount Lemmon	Mount Lemmon Survey	GEF	1.1 km	MPC · JPL
463315	2012 JG_{34}	—	December 27, 2006	Mount Lemmon	Mount Lemmon Survey	·	1.2 km	MPC · JPL
463316	2012 JB_{51}	—	April 24, 2008	Kitt Peak	Spacewatch	·	990 m	MPC · JPL
463317	2012 JK_{51}	—	September 15, 2009	Kitt Peak	Spacewatch	·	1.4 km	MPC · JPL
463318	2012 JQ_{52}	—	March 23, 2003	Apache Point	SDSS	·	1.1 km	MPC · JPL
463319	2012 JA_{55}	—	October 25, 2005	Mount Lemmon	Mount Lemmon Survey	·	1.5 km	MPC · JPL
463320	2012 JF_{60}	—	October 14, 2009	Mount Lemmon	Mount Lemmon Survey	·	2.6 km	MPC · JPL
463321	2012 KZ_{9}	—	May 1, 2012	Mount Lemmon	Mount Lemmon Survey	·	1.7 km	MPC · JPL
463322	2012 KD_{21}	—	May 14, 2008	Mount Lemmon	Mount Lemmon Survey	·	1.0 km	MPC · JPL
463323	2012 KP_{25}	—	March 29, 2012	Kitt Peak	Spacewatch	·	1.1 km	MPC · JPL
463324	2012 KJ_{28}	—	March 29, 2012	Kitt Peak	Spacewatch	MRX	850 m	MPC · JPL
463325	2012 KR_{31}	—	April 20, 2012	Mount Lemmon	Mount Lemmon Survey	·	1.2 km	MPC · JPL
463326	2012 KS_{34}	—	October 25, 2005	Kitt Peak	Spacewatch	·	1.2 km	MPC · JPL
463327	2012 KP_{42}	—	January 18, 1999	Kitt Peak	Spacewatch	·	1.6 km	MPC · JPL
463328	2012 KB_{43}	—	November 30, 2010	Mount Lemmon	Mount Lemmon Survey	ADE	1.7 km	MPC · JPL
463329	2012 KT_{45}	—	August 26, 2008	Socorro	LINEAR	·	2.4 km	MPC · JPL
463330	2012 KE_{46}	—	May 19, 2012	Catalina	CSS	·	2.1 km	MPC · JPL
463331	2012 KA_{48}	—	October 2, 2003	Kitt Peak	Spacewatch	·	2.6 km	MPC · JPL
463332	2012 KC_{49}	—	January 28, 2007	Kitt Peak	Spacewatch	·	1.2 km	MPC · JPL
463333	2012 KM_{50}	—	May 20, 2012	Mount Lemmon	Mount Lemmon Survey	EUN	1.3 km	MPC · JPL
463334	2012 LO_{8}	—	May 30, 2008	Mount Lemmon	Mount Lemmon Survey	·	1.7 km	MPC · JPL
463335	2012 LO_{17}	—	May 19, 2012	Mount Lemmon	Mount Lemmon Survey	·	1.7 km	MPC · JPL
463336	2012 MF_{3}	—	May 27, 2012	Mount Lemmon	Mount Lemmon Survey	·	2.9 km	MPC · JPL
463337	2012 MH_{5}	—	March 28, 2010	WISE	WISE	·	4.3 km	MPC · JPL
463338	2012 NC_{1}	—	June 14, 2012	Mount Lemmon	Mount Lemmon Survey	·	3.5 km	MPC · JPL
463339	2012 OM_{2}	—	April 1, 2011	Mount Lemmon	Mount Lemmon Survey	·	3.0 km	MPC · JPL
463340	2012 PR_{8}	—	September 19, 2003	Kitt Peak	Spacewatch	·	1.9 km	MPC · JPL
463341	2012 PX_{13}	—	August 17, 2006	Palomar	NEAT	·	3.6 km	MPC · JPL
463342	2012 PS_{21}	—	March 12, 2005	Mount Lemmon	Mount Lemmon Survey	EOS	2.0 km	MPC · JPL
463343	2012 PA_{35}	—	August 11, 2012	Siding Spring	SSS	·	3.9 km	MPC · JPL
463344	2012 PR_{39}	—	August 10, 2012	Kitt Peak	Spacewatch	·	3.5 km	MPC · JPL
463345	2012 PM_{42}	—	October 7, 2007	Mount Lemmon	Mount Lemmon Survey	THM	2.1 km	MPC · JPL
463346	2012 QT_{10}	—	September 14, 2007	Mount Lemmon	Mount Lemmon Survey	THM	1.9 km	MPC · JPL
463347	2012 QT_{18}	—	March 9, 2011	Kitt Peak	Spacewatch	·	3.6 km	MPC · JPL
463348	2012 QL_{21}	—	March 12, 2011	Mount Lemmon	Mount Lemmon Survey	THB	3.9 km	MPC · JPL
463349	2012 QM_{36}	—	August 22, 2006	Palomar	NEAT	·	3.2 km	MPC · JPL
463350	2012 QK_{43}	—	October 8, 2007	Catalina	CSS	·	3.0 km	MPC · JPL
463351	2012 QY_{47}	—	April 10, 2005	Kitt Peak	Spacewatch	·	3.0 km	MPC · JPL
463352	2012 RF_{8}	—	October 16, 2007	Catalina	CSS	H	450 m	MPC · JPL
463353	2012 RC_{13}	—	March 4, 2005	Kitt Peak	Spacewatch	·	2.2 km	MPC · JPL
463354	2012 RG_{25}	—	July 29, 2006	Siding Spring	SSS	·	4.1 km	MPC · JPL
463355	2012 RJ_{26}	—	April 26, 2006	Cerro Tololo	Deep Ecliptic Survey	·	1.6 km	MPC · JPL
463356	2012 RR_{26}	—	October 12, 2007	Mount Lemmon	Mount Lemmon Survey	·	2.8 km	MPC · JPL
463357	2012 SH_{22}	—	May 19, 2005	Mount Lemmon	Mount Lemmon Survey	·	3.1 km	MPC · JPL
463358	2012 ST_{40}	—	October 2, 2006	Mount Lemmon	Mount Lemmon Survey	SYL · CYB	3.4 km	MPC · JPL
463359	2012 SO_{56}	—	September 14, 2012	Catalina	CSS	H	470 m	MPC · JPL
463360	2012 TU	—	October 4, 2012	Haleakala	Pan-STARRS 1	AMO	260 m	MPC · JPL
463361	2012 TT_{14}	—	September 13, 2007	Catalina	CSS	H	380 m	MPC · JPL
463362	2012 TB_{30}	—	September 15, 2012	ESA OGS	ESA OGS	·	3.0 km	MPC · JPL
463363	2012 TR_{44}	—	April 12, 2005	Mount Lemmon	Mount Lemmon Survey	·	3.5 km	MPC · JPL
463364	2012 TR_{105}	—	June 28, 2006	Siding Spring	SSS	·	3.0 km	MPC · JPL
463365	2012 TU_{132}	—	May 22, 2010	WISE	WISE	·	4.5 km	MPC · JPL
463366	2012 TX_{159}	—	April 22, 2011	Kitt Peak	Spacewatch	·	2.0 km	MPC · JPL
463367	2012 UQ_{115}	—	October 17, 2006	Kitt Peak	Spacewatch	·	3.2 km	MPC · JPL
463368 Eurytus	2012 VU_{85}	Eurytus	November 14, 2012	Mount Graham	K. Černis, Boyle, R. P.	centaur	190 km	MPC · JPL
463369	2012 WV_{35}	—	November 19, 2004	Catalina	CSS	H	600 m	MPC · JPL
463370	2012 XW_{45}	—	October 21, 2012	Haleakala	Pan-STARRS 1	·	3.3 km	MPC · JPL
463371	2012 XT_{54}	—	April 26, 2003	Kitt Peak	Spacewatch	H	580 m	MPC · JPL
463372	2013 AT	—	January 11, 2008	Mount Lemmon	Mount Lemmon Survey	H	580 m	MPC · JPL
463373	2013 AH_{78}	—	November 4, 2007	Mount Lemmon	Mount Lemmon Survey	H	480 m	MPC · JPL
463374	2013 AC_{94}	—	June 5, 2011	Mount Lemmon	Mount Lemmon Survey	H	630 m	MPC · JPL
463375	2013 AX_{96}	—	December 13, 2004	Campo Imperatore	CINEOS	H	520 m	MPC · JPL
463376	2013 AT_{105}	—	January 10, 2013	Catalina	CSS	H	580 m	MPC · JPL
463377	2013 BH_{16}	—	January 16, 2008	Kitt Peak	Spacewatch	H	610 m	MPC · JPL
463378	2013 BK_{25}	—	January 18, 2013	Mount Lemmon	Mount Lemmon Survey	·	2.7 km	MPC · JPL
463379	2013 BJ_{45}	—	June 29, 2003	Socorro	LINEAR	H	590 m	MPC · JPL
463380	2013 BY_{45}	—	April 6, 2010	Mount Lemmon	Mount Lemmon Survey	AMO · slow	560 m	MPC · JPL
463381	2013 BM_{62}	—	January 9, 2013	Kitt Peak	Spacewatch	·	1.5 km	MPC · JPL
463382	2013 BE_{64}	—	January 18, 2013	Kitt Peak	Spacewatch	·	1.0 km	MPC · JPL
463383	2013 CK_{23}	—	May 7, 2005	Catalina	CSS	H	550 m	MPC · JPL
463384	2013 CM_{33}	—	January 17, 2013	Catalina	CSS	H	650 m	MPC · JPL
463385	2013 CT_{35}	—	September 20, 2006	Anderson Mesa	LONEOS	H	600 m	MPC · JPL
463386	2013 CC_{55}	—	August 29, 1995	Kitt Peak	Spacewatch	H	540 m	MPC · JPL
463387	2013 CT_{82}	—	February 8, 2013	Haleakala	Pan-STARRS 1	APO · PHA	730 m	MPC · JPL
463388	2013 CL_{181}	—	February 11, 2013	Catalina	CSS	H	470 m	MPC · JPL
463389	2013 ED_{5}	—	August 3, 2011	Haleakala	Pan-STARRS 1	H	480 m	MPC · JPL
463390	2013 EX_{23}	—	March 8, 2013	Haleakala	Pan-STARRS 1	H	510 m	MPC · JPL
463391	2013 EA_{115}	—	March 2, 2006	Kitt Peak	Spacewatch	·	660 m	MPC · JPL
463392	2013 FF_{25}	—	March 12, 2013	Kitt Peak	Spacewatch	·	770 m	MPC · JPL
463393	2013 GN_{28}	—	December 4, 2008	Mount Lemmon	Mount Lemmon Survey	·	660 m	MPC · JPL
463394	2013 GV_{28}	—	December 3, 2008	Mount Lemmon	Mount Lemmon Survey	·	550 m	MPC · JPL
463395	2013 GH_{34}	—	September 14, 2006	Kitt Peak	Spacewatch	H	420 m	MPC · JPL
463396	2013 GS_{34}	—	September 10, 2007	Pic du Midi	Sogorb, P.	·	640 m	MPC · JPL
463397	2013 GU_{41}	—	October 7, 2004	Socorro	LINEAR	·	660 m	MPC · JPL
463398	2013 GD_{79}	—	November 18, 2008	Kitt Peak	Spacewatch	·	710 m	MPC · JPL
463399	2013 GD_{89}	—	March 24, 2003	Kitt Peak	Spacewatch	·	680 m	MPC · JPL
463400	2013 GP_{109}	—	May 16, 2010	WISE	WISE	·	740 m	MPC · JPL

== 463401–463500 ==
back to top

Designation			Discovery			Properties		Ref
Permanent	Provisional	Named after	Date	Site	Discoverer(s)	Category	Diam.	Ref
463401	2013 GL_{123}	—	April 11, 2013	Mount Lemmon	Mount Lemmon Survey	V	590 m	MPC · JPL
463402	2013 GP_{135}	—	October 24, 2011	Kitt Peak	Spacewatch	·	530 m	MPC · JPL
463403	2013 HG_{10}	—	March 13, 2013	Kitt Peak	Spacewatch	PHO	770 m	MPC · JPL
463404	2013 HU_{11}	—	October 17, 2003	Socorro	LINEAR	PHO	1.8 km	MPC · JPL
463405	2013 HF_{15}	—	February 16, 2013	Mount Lemmon	Mount Lemmon Survey	·	880 m	MPC · JPL
463406	2013 HU_{17}	—	April 18, 2013	Kitt Peak	Spacewatch	·	680 m	MPC · JPL
463407	2013 HX_{36}	—	August 10, 2010	XuYi	PMO NEO Survey Program	·	1.0 km	MPC · JPL
463408	2013 HX_{38}	—	September 23, 2011	Kitt Peak	Spacewatch	·	590 m	MPC · JPL
463409	2013 HK_{43}	—	January 31, 2006	Kitt Peak	Spacewatch	·	490 m	MPC · JPL
463410	2013 HJ_{44}	—	October 18, 2011	Kitt Peak	Spacewatch	·	630 m	MPC · JPL
463411	2013 HF_{60}	—	December 31, 2008	Kitt Peak	Spacewatch	·	710 m	MPC · JPL
463412	2013 HY_{67}	—	September 24, 2007	Kitt Peak	Spacewatch	·	630 m	MPC · JPL
463413	2013 HJ_{73}	—	September 13, 2007	Mount Lemmon	Mount Lemmon Survey	·	690 m	MPC · JPL
463414	2013 HS_{78}	—	November 19, 2008	Kitt Peak	Spacewatch	·	670 m	MPC · JPL
463415	2013 HV_{85}	—	October 5, 2004	Tucson	R. A. Tucker	·	690 m	MPC · JPL
463416	2013 HT_{86}	—	September 15, 2007	Mount Lemmon	Mount Lemmon Survey	·	540 m	MPC · JPL
463417	2013 HO_{89}	—	September 19, 1998	Apache Point	SDSS	·	800 m	MPC · JPL
463418	2013 HU_{111}	—	February 1, 2009	Kitt Peak	Spacewatch	·	570 m	MPC · JPL
463419	2013 HQ_{118}	—	October 21, 2011	Mount Lemmon	Mount Lemmon Survey	·	760 m	MPC · JPL
463420	2013 HD_{128}	—	October 22, 2008	Kitt Peak	Spacewatch	·	910 m	MPC · JPL
463421	2013 JH_{6}	—	March 27, 2003	Campo Imperatore	CINEOS	·	540 m	MPC · JPL
463422	2013 JG_{13}	—	February 5, 2009	Kitt Peak	Spacewatch	(883)	920 m	MPC · JPL
463423	2013 JL_{25}	—	October 11, 2007	Lulin	LUSS	·	1.4 km	MPC · JPL
463424	2013 JF_{41}	—	September 25, 2001	Socorro	LINEAR	·	1.6 km	MPC · JPL
463425	2013 JH_{46}	—	September 4, 2000	Anderson Mesa	LONEOS	·	1.9 km	MPC · JPL
463426	2013 KB_{1}	—	December 29, 2005	Kitt Peak	Spacewatch	·	520 m	MPC · JPL
463427	2013 KB_{14}	—	February 3, 2009	Kitt Peak	Spacewatch	·	700 m	MPC · JPL
463428	2013 KY_{16}	—	October 19, 2007	Mount Lemmon	Mount Lemmon Survey	·	660 m	MPC · JPL
463429	2013 LV_{12}	—	November 22, 2006	Mount Lemmon	Mount Lemmon Survey	·	1.8 km	MPC · JPL
463430	2013 LL_{16}	—	October 15, 2007	Mount Lemmon	Mount Lemmon Survey	·	1.1 km	MPC · JPL
463431	2013 LJ_{22}	—	June 3, 2013	Kitt Peak	Spacewatch	·	1.9 km	MPC · JPL
463432	2013 LJ_{23}	—	December 21, 2008	Kitt Peak	Spacewatch	·	770 m	MPC · JPL
463433	2013 LV_{25}	—	January 27, 2012	Mount Lemmon	Mount Lemmon Survey	·	2.7 km	MPC · JPL
463434	2013 LC_{35}	—	February 20, 2006	Kitt Peak	Spacewatch	·	540 m	MPC · JPL
463435	2013 LF_{35}	—	October 1, 2010	Kitt Peak	Spacewatch	·	1.5 km	MPC · JPL
463436	2013 MN_{4}	—	October 10, 2002	Apache Point	SDSS	NYS	1.1 km	MPC · JPL
463437	2013 MO_{4}	—	May 27, 2009	Mount Lemmon	Mount Lemmon Survey	·	1.3 km	MPC · JPL
463438	2013 ML_{5}	—	May 3, 2006	Mount Lemmon	Mount Lemmon Survey	·	530 m	MPC · JPL
463439	2013 MQ_{5}	—	October 31, 2006	Mount Lemmon	Mount Lemmon Survey	·	1.2 km	MPC · JPL
463440	2013 MR_{5}	—	March 8, 2005	Kitt Peak	Spacewatch	·	1.1 km	MPC · JPL
463441	2013 MR_{9}	—	April 2, 2006	Mount Lemmon	Mount Lemmon Survey	·	650 m	MPC · JPL
463442	2013 NW_{7}	—	March 29, 2008	Catalina	CSS	·	1.8 km	MPC · JPL
463443	2013 NS_{10}	—	August 17, 2009	Kitt Peak	Spacewatch	ADE	1.5 km	MPC · JPL
463444	2013 NE_{12}	—	March 8, 2005	Mount Lemmon	Mount Lemmon Survey	NYS	1.1 km	MPC · JPL
463445	2013 NN_{13}	—	October 27, 2008	Mount Lemmon	Mount Lemmon Survey	HYG	2.9 km	MPC · JPL
463446	2013 NQ_{19}	—	February 13, 2011	Mount Lemmon	Mount Lemmon Survey	·	2.0 km	MPC · JPL
463447	2013 NX_{19}	—	December 13, 2006	Kitt Peak	Spacewatch	ADE	2.1 km	MPC · JPL
463448	2013 NA_{20}	—	February 28, 2010	WISE	WISE	·	2.1 km	MPC · JPL
463449	2013 NE_{20}	—	September 18, 2003	Kitt Peak	Spacewatch	·	610 m	MPC · JPL
463450	2013 OJ_{4}	—	May 19, 2006	Mount Lemmon	Mount Lemmon Survey	·	580 m	MPC · JPL
463451	2013 OB_{5}	—	March 29, 2009	Kitt Peak	Spacewatch	·	640 m	MPC · JPL
463452	2013 OU_{7}	—	February 21, 2007	Mount Lemmon	Mount Lemmon Survey	·	1.8 km	MPC · JPL
463453	2013 OQ_{9}	—	October 4, 2006	Mount Lemmon	Mount Lemmon Survey	·	1.4 km	MPC · JPL
463454	2013 PB_{1}	—	December 18, 2007	Mount Lemmon	Mount Lemmon Survey	·	1.4 km	MPC · JPL
463455	2013 PS_{3}	—	February 27, 2010	WISE	WISE	·	3.3 km	MPC · JPL
463456	2013 PV_{3}	—	October 19, 2006	Mount Lemmon	Mount Lemmon Survey	·	1.2 km	MPC · JPL
463457	2013 PX_{10}	—	September 28, 2009	Kitt Peak	Spacewatch	·	2.0 km	MPC · JPL
463458	2013 PP_{15}	—	October 10, 2008	Mount Lemmon	Mount Lemmon Survey	·	2.7 km	MPC · JPL
463459	2013 PR_{15}	—	November 21, 2003	Kitt Peak	Spacewatch	EOS	1.8 km	MPC · JPL
463460	2013 PN_{16}	—	December 21, 2006	Mount Lemmon	Mount Lemmon Survey	·	1.6 km	MPC · JPL
463461	2013 PS_{19}	—	February 19, 2012	Kitt Peak	Spacewatch	(5)	1.3 km	MPC · JPL
463462	2013 PV_{20}	—	October 31, 2008	Catalina	CSS	·	4.2 km	MPC · JPL
463463	2013 PV_{24}	—	June 7, 2013	Mount Lemmon	Mount Lemmon Survey	·	2.6 km	MPC · JPL
463464	2013 PC_{25}	—	March 3, 2005	Kitt Peak	Spacewatch	·	1.5 km	MPC · JPL
463465	2013 PA_{29}	—	December 25, 2005	Kitt Peak	Spacewatch	·	1.9 km	MPC · JPL
463466	2013 PY_{29}	—	April 15, 2007	Kitt Peak	Spacewatch	·	1.6 km	MPC · JPL
463467	2013 PX_{30}	—	February 10, 2008	Kitt Peak	Spacewatch	NYS	1.2 km	MPC · JPL
463468	2013 PB_{31}	—	January 3, 2011	Mount Lemmon	Mount Lemmon Survey	·	1.6 km	MPC · JPL
463469	2013 PR_{32}	—	June 13, 2004	Kitt Peak	Spacewatch	·	1.3 km	MPC · JPL
463470	2013 PP_{35}	—	August 15, 2004	Campo Imperatore	CINEOS	·	1.6 km	MPC · JPL
463471	2013 PS_{35}	—	September 8, 1996	Kitt Peak	Spacewatch	·	1.3 km	MPC · JPL
463472	2013 PO_{40}	—	September 16, 2003	Kitt Peak	Spacewatch	·	1.6 km	MPC · JPL
463473	2013 PA_{43}	—	January 26, 2010	WISE	WISE	·	3.0 km	MPC · JPL
463474	2013 PD_{50}	—	August 31, 2005	Anderson Mesa	LONEOS	·	1.1 km	MPC · JPL
463475	2013 PW_{52}	—	May 17, 2012	Kitt Peak	Spacewatch	·	4.0 km	MPC · JPL
463476	2013 PQ_{57}	—	September 17, 2009	Mount Lemmon	Mount Lemmon Survey	·	1.5 km	MPC · JPL
463477	2013 PX_{57}	—	July 27, 2009	Kitt Peak	Spacewatch	·	1.3 km	MPC · JPL
463478	2013 PE_{65}	—	September 7, 2004	Kitt Peak	Spacewatch	·	1.6 km	MPC · JPL
463479	2013 PH_{66}	—	October 8, 2008	Mount Lemmon	Mount Lemmon Survey	EOS	1.7 km	MPC · JPL
463480	2013 PC_{74}	—	January 19, 2012	Kitt Peak	Spacewatch	·	1.3 km	MPC · JPL
463481	2013 QK_{5}	—	April 22, 2012	Kitt Peak	Spacewatch	·	1.8 km	MPC · JPL
463482	2013 QR_{12}	—	May 3, 2010	WISE	WISE	·	3.5 km	MPC · JPL
463483	2013 QV_{13}	—	October 1, 2008	Mount Lemmon	Mount Lemmon Survey	·	2.8 km	MPC · JPL
463484	2013 QG_{14}	—	January 5, 2010	Kitt Peak	Spacewatch	VER	3.2 km	MPC · JPL
463485	2013 QW_{23}	—	September 19, 2009	Kitt Peak	Spacewatch	·	1.6 km	MPC · JPL
463486	2013 QN_{26}	—	April 5, 2005	Mount Lemmon	Mount Lemmon Survey	MAS	860 m	MPC · JPL
463487	2013 QE_{29}	—	September 13, 2005	Kitt Peak	Spacewatch	·	910 m	MPC · JPL
463488	2013 QG_{29}	—	February 12, 2008	Kitt Peak	Spacewatch	NYS	990 m	MPC · JPL
463489	2013 QF_{30}	—	July 11, 2004	Socorro	LINEAR	·	2.3 km	MPC · JPL
463490	2013 QG_{30}	—	January 17, 2007	Kitt Peak	Spacewatch	·	1.9 km	MPC · JPL
463491	2013 QH_{37}	—	October 19, 2003	Apache Point	SDSS	·	1.6 km	MPC · JPL
463492	2013 QD_{38}	—	September 18, 2009	Catalina	CSS	·	1.7 km	MPC · JPL
463493	2013 QV_{41}	—	September 22, 2009	Kitt Peak	Spacewatch	·	1.6 km	MPC · JPL
463494	2013 QM_{42}	—	January 8, 2010	Kitt Peak	Spacewatch	THM	2.3 km	MPC · JPL
463495	2013 QX_{48}	—	March 10, 2008	Kitt Peak	Spacewatch	·	880 m	MPC · JPL
463496	2013 QN_{50}	—	February 16, 2010	Mount Lemmon	Mount Lemmon Survey	·	2.7 km	MPC · JPL
463497	2013 QW_{53}	—	March 25, 2012	Mount Lemmon	Mount Lemmon Survey	·	1.7 km	MPC · JPL
463498	2013 QO_{54}	—	April 6, 2010	WISE	WISE	·	4.7 km	MPC · JPL
463499	2013 QA_{55}	—	April 20, 2009	Mount Lemmon	Mount Lemmon Survey	NYS	990 m	MPC · JPL
463500	2013 QH_{55}	—	November 9, 2009	Mount Lemmon	Mount Lemmon Survey	·	1.8 km	MPC · JPL

== 463501–463600 ==
back to top

Designation			Discovery			Properties		Ref
Permanent	Provisional	Named after	Date	Site	Discoverer(s)	Category	Diam.	Ref
463501	2013 QA_{57}	—	May 9, 2005	Kitt Peak	Spacewatch	V	700 m	MPC · JPL
463502	2013 QG_{57}	—	February 7, 2008	Kitt Peak	Spacewatch	·	1.2 km	MPC · JPL
463503	2013 QA_{58}	—	September 15, 2009	Kitt Peak	Spacewatch	·	1.4 km	MPC · JPL
463504	2013 QL_{58}	—	July 30, 2013	Kitt Peak	Spacewatch	·	1.1 km	MPC · JPL
463505	2013 QC_{59}	—	September 19, 2008	Kitt Peak	Spacewatch	EOS	1.6 km	MPC · JPL
463506	2013 QT_{59}	—	April 22, 2012	Kitt Peak	Spacewatch	EOS	1.9 km	MPC · JPL
463507	2013 QU_{59}	—	February 13, 2008	Mount Lemmon	Mount Lemmon Survey	·	1.0 km	MPC · JPL
463508	2013 QN_{60}	—	March 4, 2011	Catalina	CSS	EOS	1.9 km	MPC · JPL
463509	2013 QE_{61}	—	September 23, 2009	Mount Lemmon	Mount Lemmon Survey	·	1.4 km	MPC · JPL
463510	2013 QS_{61}	—	September 29, 2003	Kitt Peak	Spacewatch	·	740 m	MPC · JPL
463511	2013 QZ_{62}	—	March 1, 2008	Kitt Peak	Spacewatch	·	1.7 km	MPC · JPL
463512	2013 QN_{64}	—	February 21, 2012	Kitt Peak	Spacewatch	·	1.3 km	MPC · JPL
463513	2013 QK_{66}	—	September 7, 2008	Mount Lemmon	Mount Lemmon Survey	EOS	1.4 km	MPC · JPL
463514	2013 QT_{67}	—	February 23, 2007	Mount Lemmon	Mount Lemmon Survey	·	1.8 km	MPC · JPL
463515	2013 QB_{68}	—	July 30, 2013	Kitt Peak	Spacewatch	MAR	830 m	MPC · JPL
463516	2013 QT_{68}	—	February 26, 2011	Mount Lemmon	Mount Lemmon Survey	·	2.1 km	MPC · JPL
463517	2013 QB_{71}	—	October 28, 2005	Kitt Peak	Spacewatch	·	1.1 km	MPC · JPL
463518	2013 QC_{71}	—	September 29, 2003	Kitt Peak	Spacewatch	·	650 m	MPC · JPL
463519	2013 QL_{73}	—	November 17, 2009	Mount Lemmon	Mount Lemmon Survey	AGN	950 m	MPC · JPL
463520	2013 QX_{75}	—	January 5, 2006	Mount Lemmon	Mount Lemmon Survey	NEM	2.2 km	MPC · JPL
463521	2013 QZ_{88}	—	September 28, 2003	Apache Point	SDSS	·	2.2 km	MPC · JPL
463522	2013 QU_{90}	—	October 6, 2008	Mount Lemmon	Mount Lemmon Survey	·	2.4 km	MPC · JPL
463523	2013 QD_{92}	—	October 9, 2008	Mount Lemmon	Mount Lemmon Survey	VER	2.5 km	MPC · JPL
463524	2013 QK_{95}	—	July 11, 2004	Palomar	NEAT	·	2.3 km	MPC · JPL
463525	2013 RM_{1}	—	January 31, 2003	Palomar	NEAT	·	1.3 km	MPC · JPL
463526	2013 RP_{1}	—	March 28, 2012	Mount Lemmon	Mount Lemmon Survey	·	1.5 km	MPC · JPL
463527	2013 RH_{2}	—	November 15, 1995	Kitt Peak	Spacewatch	·	2.0 km	MPC · JPL
463528	2013 RX_{10}	—	September 11, 2004	Kitt Peak	Spacewatch	WIT	920 m	MPC · JPL
463529	2013 RC_{15}	—	October 17, 2010	Mount Lemmon	Mount Lemmon Survey	·	1.3 km	MPC · JPL
463530	2013 RP_{15}	—	January 12, 2011	Mount Lemmon	Mount Lemmon Survey	·	1.6 km	MPC · JPL
463531	2013 RT_{17}	—	July 28, 2013	Kitt Peak	Spacewatch	·	1.3 km	MPC · JPL
463532	2013 RW_{21}	—	September 12, 2007	Mount Lemmon	Mount Lemmon Survey	·	2.9 km	MPC · JPL
463533	2013 RS_{22}	—	May 29, 2008	Mount Lemmon	Mount Lemmon Survey	·	1.4 km	MPC · JPL
463534	2013 RQ_{23}	—	March 13, 2007	Mount Lemmon	Mount Lemmon Survey	·	1.9 km	MPC · JPL
463535	2013 RJ_{24}	—	March 6, 2011	Mount Lemmon	Mount Lemmon Survey	·	2.4 km	MPC · JPL
463536	2013 RB_{28}	—	November 23, 2009	Mount Lemmon	Mount Lemmon Survey	·	1.4 km	MPC · JPL
463537	2013 RU_{29}	—	January 25, 2011	Mount Lemmon	Mount Lemmon Survey	·	1.3 km	MPC · JPL
463538	2013 RV_{32}	—	August 9, 2004	Socorro	LINEAR	·	1.8 km	MPC · JPL
463539	2013 RZ_{33}	—	May 11, 2008	Kitt Peak	Spacewatch	·	1.4 km	MPC · JPL
463540	2013 RM_{39}	—	March 12, 2003	Kitt Peak	Spacewatch	·	1.6 km	MPC · JPL
463541	2013 RW_{40}	—	April 26, 2010	WISE	WISE	·	4.6 km	MPC · JPL
463542	2013 RH_{44}	—	June 21, 2007	Mount Lemmon	Mount Lemmon Survey	·	3.5 km	MPC · JPL
463543	2013 RJ_{44}	—	October 29, 2008	Kitt Peak	Spacewatch	·	3.9 km	MPC · JPL
463544	2013 RM_{44}	—	August 30, 2008	Socorro	LINEAR	·	2.5 km	MPC · JPL
463545	2013 RA_{45}	—	September 11, 2004	Socorro	LINEAR	·	2.2 km	MPC · JPL
463546	2013 RL_{48}	—	September 6, 2008	Mount Lemmon	Mount Lemmon Survey	KOR	1.1 km	MPC · JPL
463547	2013 RN_{48}	—	September 3, 2008	Kitt Peak	Spacewatch	·	1.5 km	MPC · JPL
463548	2013 RU_{48}	—	October 4, 2004	Kitt Peak	Spacewatch	·	1.8 km	MPC · JPL
463549	2013 RM_{49}	—	July 30, 2009	Catalina	CSS	·	1.3 km	MPC · JPL
463550	2013 RA_{50}	—	April 7, 2003	Kitt Peak	Spacewatch	·	1.8 km	MPC · JPL
463551	2013 RH_{50}	—	October 31, 2006	Mount Lemmon	Mount Lemmon Survey	·	1.4 km	MPC · JPL
463552	2013 RX_{50}	—	September 18, 2009	Kitt Peak	Spacewatch	MAR	840 m	MPC · JPL
463553	2013 RD_{51}	—	April 8, 2003	Kitt Peak	Spacewatch	·	1.7 km	MPC · JPL
463554	2013 RL_{53}	—	September 29, 2008	Mount Lemmon	Mount Lemmon Survey	EOS	1.7 km	MPC · JPL
463555	2013 RZ_{54}	—	November 1, 2006	Mount Lemmon	Mount Lemmon Survey	·	1.3 km	MPC · JPL
463556	2013 RF_{58}	—	December 21, 2005	Kitt Peak	Spacewatch	·	1.9 km	MPC · JPL
463557	2013 RG_{58}	—	August 23, 2004	Kitt Peak	Spacewatch	·	1.6 km	MPC · JPL
463558	2013 RZ_{58}	—	March 2, 2005	Kitt Peak	Spacewatch	EOS	1.7 km	MPC · JPL
463559	2013 RU_{59}	—	September 10, 2013	Haleakala	Pan-STARRS 1	·	4.1 km	MPC · JPL
463560	2013 RZ_{60}	—	January 16, 2011	Mount Lemmon	Mount Lemmon Survey	·	2.2 km	MPC · JPL
463561	2013 RY_{65}	—	March 10, 2011	Kitt Peak	Spacewatch	EOS	1.6 km	MPC · JPL
463562	2013 RE_{68}	—	October 7, 2004	Kitt Peak	Spacewatch	·	1.9 km	MPC · JPL
463563	2013 RJ_{71}	—	September 25, 2008	Mount Lemmon	Mount Lemmon Survey	·	1.8 km	MPC · JPL
463564	2013 RC_{75}	—	February 23, 2012	Mount Lemmon	Mount Lemmon Survey	NYS	1.2 km	MPC · JPL
463565	2013 RT_{75}	—	September 13, 2002	Palomar	NEAT	·	2.5 km	MPC · JPL
463566	2013 RE_{76}	—	March 4, 2005	Mount Lemmon	Mount Lemmon Survey	·	3.6 km	MPC · JPL
463567	2013 RS_{78}	—	March 6, 2011	Mount Lemmon	Mount Lemmon Survey	·	2.1 km	MPC · JPL
463568	2013 RN_{79}	—	September 15, 2009	Kitt Peak	Spacewatch	·	1.3 km	MPC · JPL
463569	2013 RS_{79}	—	August 21, 2009	Socorro	LINEAR	PHO	990 m	MPC · JPL
463570	2013 RH_{80}	—	October 24, 2008	Kitt Peak	Spacewatch	·	2.6 km	MPC · JPL
463571	2013 RW_{82}	—	February 8, 2011	Mount Lemmon	Mount Lemmon Survey	T_{j} (2.93)	3.4 km	MPC · JPL
463572	2013 RH_{88}	—	September 23, 2008	Kitt Peak	Spacewatch	·	1.6 km	MPC · JPL
463573	2013 RK_{90}	—	February 9, 2005	Kitt Peak	Spacewatch	·	3.3 km	MPC · JPL
463574	2013 RN_{92}	—	April 5, 2005	Mount Lemmon	Mount Lemmon Survey	·	2.8 km	MPC · JPL
463575	2013 RK_{94}	—	September 9, 2007	Kitt Peak	Spacewatch	·	3.2 km	MPC · JPL
463576	2013 SZ_{13}	—	October 28, 2008	Kitt Peak	Spacewatch	·	2.5 km	MPC · JPL
463577	2013 SH_{14}	—	September 3, 2013	Mount Lemmon	Mount Lemmon Survey	·	2.0 km	MPC · JPL
463578	2013 SL_{14}	—	March 13, 2012	Mount Lemmon	Mount Lemmon Survey	·	1.3 km	MPC · JPL
463579	2013 SZ_{15}	—	September 24, 2008	Kitt Peak	Spacewatch	·	2.4 km	MPC · JPL
463580	2013 ST_{17}	—	October 15, 2004	Mount Lemmon	Mount Lemmon Survey	·	1.8 km	MPC · JPL
463581	2013 SX_{18}	—	March 13, 2007	Kitt Peak	Spacewatch	·	1.9 km	MPC · JPL
463582	2013 SL_{21}	—	May 18, 2010	WISE	WISE	T_{j} (2.99)	3.4 km	MPC · JPL
463583	2013 SB_{22}	—	September 16, 2009	Kitt Peak	Spacewatch	ADE	1.7 km	MPC · JPL
463584	2013 SD_{23}	—	March 26, 2007	Kitt Peak	Spacewatch	GEF	1.2 km	MPC · JPL
463585	2013 SD_{30}	—	April 6, 2008	Kitt Peak	Spacewatch	JUN	960 m	MPC · JPL
463586	2013 SG_{30}	—	May 7, 2010	WISE	WISE	·	3.4 km	MPC · JPL
463587	2013 SZ_{31}	—	October 21, 2008	Mount Lemmon	Mount Lemmon Survey	·	2.4 km	MPC · JPL
463588	2013 SG_{33}	—	December 16, 2009	Mount Lemmon	Mount Lemmon Survey	·	3.5 km	MPC · JPL
463589	2013 SR_{34}	—	September 25, 2008	Kitt Peak	Spacewatch	EOS	1.5 km	MPC · JPL
463590	2013 SS_{34}	—	March 17, 2005	Mount Lemmon	Mount Lemmon Survey	·	2.6 km	MPC · JPL
463591	2013 SE_{35}	—	October 2, 2008	Kitt Peak	Spacewatch	·	1.8 km	MPC · JPL
463592	2013 ST_{35}	—	September 1, 2013	Mount Lemmon	Mount Lemmon Survey	·	3.3 km	MPC · JPL
463593	2013 SY_{36}	—	September 7, 2008	Mount Lemmon	Mount Lemmon Survey	·	3.0 km	MPC · JPL
463594	2013 SP_{38}	—	January 15, 2005	Kitt Peak	Spacewatch	·	1.6 km	MPC · JPL
463595	2013 SB_{39}	—	September 13, 2013	Mount Lemmon	Mount Lemmon Survey	·	1.7 km	MPC · JPL
463596	2013 SJ_{40}	—	September 26, 2009	Catalina	CSS	·	1.7 km	MPC · JPL
463597	2013 SM_{40}	—	October 26, 2001	Palomar	NEAT	·	1.5 km	MPC · JPL
463598	2013 SP_{44}	—	September 23, 2008	Kitt Peak	Spacewatch	·	2.5 km	MPC · JPL
463599	2013 SC_{47}	—	June 12, 2005	Kitt Peak	Spacewatch	·	1.1 km	MPC · JPL
463600	2013 SP_{48}	—	October 1, 2002	Haleakala	NEAT	·	2.8 km	MPC · JPL

== 463601–463700 ==
back to top

Designation			Discovery			Properties		Ref
Permanent	Provisional	Named after	Date	Site	Discoverer(s)	Category	Diam.	Ref
463601	2013 SP_{50}	—	September 3, 2007	Catalina	CSS	·	3.2 km	MPC · JPL
463602	2013 SZ_{51}	—	November 20, 2008	Kitt Peak	Spacewatch	·	2.9 km	MPC · JPL
463603	2013 SA_{58}	—	October 21, 2008	Mount Lemmon	Mount Lemmon Survey	·	2.8 km	MPC · JPL
463604	2013 SQ_{60}	—	October 3, 2002	Palomar	NEAT	·	3.1 km	MPC · JPL
463605	2013 SN_{61}	—	October 6, 1996	Kitt Peak	Spacewatch	HYG	2.6 km	MPC · JPL
463606	2013 SS_{61}	—	January 21, 2010	WISE	WISE	·	3.0 km	MPC · JPL
463607	2013 SS_{67}	—	April 24, 2003	Kitt Peak	Spacewatch	·	2.2 km	MPC · JPL
463608	2013 SO_{72}	—	October 7, 2005	Kitt Peak	Spacewatch	·	910 m	MPC · JPL
463609	2013 SG_{73}	—	January 31, 2006	Kitt Peak	Spacewatch	KOR	1.3 km	MPC · JPL
463610	2013 SL_{76}	—	September 12, 2013	Catalina	CSS	·	2.9 km	MPC · JPL
463611	2013 SR_{76}	—	October 11, 2004	Palomar	NEAT	·	2.4 km	MPC · JPL
463612	2013 SZ_{79}	—	September 30, 1995	Kitt Peak	Spacewatch	·	1.6 km	MPC · JPL
463613	2013 SA_{85}	—	April 11, 2003	Kitt Peak	Spacewatch	·	1.9 km	MPC · JPL
463614	2013 SF_{86}	—	September 3, 2013	Kitt Peak	Spacewatch	·	2.6 km	MPC · JPL
463615	2013 TQ_{8}	—	May 11, 2005	Palomar	NEAT	·	1.2 km	MPC · JPL
463616	2013 TS_{8}	—	September 17, 2009	Kitt Peak	Spacewatch	EUN	1.1 km	MPC · JPL
463617	2013 TD_{9}	—	October 26, 2009	Mount Lemmon	Mount Lemmon Survey	MAR	1.1 km	MPC · JPL
463618	2013 TD_{13}	—	September 4, 2013	Mount Lemmon	Mount Lemmon Survey	·	2.8 km	MPC · JPL
463619	2013 TJ_{13}	—	September 26, 2008	Kitt Peak	Spacewatch	·	1.9 km	MPC · JPL
463620	2013 TQ_{13}	—	March 16, 2005	Kitt Peak	Spacewatch	·	3.1 km	MPC · JPL
463621	2013 TZ_{20}	—	September 12, 2007	Mount Lemmon	Mount Lemmon Survey	·	2.9 km	MPC · JPL
463622	2013 TO_{23}	—	November 13, 2002	Palomar	NEAT	·	3.9 km	MPC · JPL
463623	2013 TX_{24}	—	March 15, 2007	Kitt Peak	Spacewatch	·	2.1 km	MPC · JPL
463624	2013 TY_{27}	—	March 23, 2003	Kitt Peak	Spacewatch	·	1.3 km	MPC · JPL
463625	2013 TE_{30}	—	April 22, 2007	Mount Lemmon	Mount Lemmon Survey	GEF	1.4 km	MPC · JPL
463626	2013 TD_{33}	—	March 14, 2007	Mount Lemmon	Mount Lemmon Survey	·	3.0 km	MPC · JPL
463627	2013 TQ_{33}	—	November 30, 2003	Kitt Peak	Spacewatch	·	1.1 km	MPC · JPL
463628	2013 TN_{36}	—	September 20, 2006	Anderson Mesa	LONEOS	·	1.0 km	MPC · JPL
463629	2013 TP_{36}	—	March 16, 2007	Kitt Peak	Spacewatch	·	2.0 km	MPC · JPL
463630	2013 TD_{51}	—	May 27, 2010	WISE	WISE	·	3.6 km	MPC · JPL
463631	2013 TK_{52}	—	October 26, 2008	Kitt Peak	Spacewatch	·	2.8 km	MPC · JPL
463632	2013 TW_{67}	—	May 28, 2008	Desert Eagle	W. K. Y. Yeung	·	1.7 km	MPC · JPL
463633	2013 TZ_{87}	—	March 8, 2005	Mount Lemmon	Mount Lemmon Survey	·	2.6 km	MPC · JPL
463634	2013 TE_{89}	—	October 28, 2008	Kitt Peak	Spacewatch	EOS	2.1 km	MPC · JPL
463635	2013 TG_{102}	—	October 20, 2008	Kitt Peak	Spacewatch	·	2.7 km	MPC · JPL
463636	2013 TH_{106}	—	October 23, 2008	Kitt Peak	Spacewatch	·	1.5 km	MPC · JPL
463637	2013 TR_{107}	—	April 16, 2005	Kitt Peak	Spacewatch	·	3.3 km	MPC · JPL
463638	2013 TA_{110}	—	January 28, 2011	Mount Lemmon	Mount Lemmon Survey	·	1.5 km	MPC · JPL
463639	2013 TC_{112}	—	September 30, 1991	Kitt Peak	Spacewatch	·	1.9 km	MPC · JPL
463640	2013 TH_{113}	—	May 29, 2008	Mount Lemmon	Mount Lemmon Survey	·	1.5 km	MPC · JPL
463641	2013 TA_{114}	—	November 4, 2002	Kitt Peak	Spacewatch	EOS	1.9 km	MPC · JPL
463642	2013 TD_{115}	—	June 1, 2010	WISE	WISE	·	3.6 km	MPC · JPL
463643	2013 TD_{126}	—	April 30, 2012	Mount Lemmon	Mount Lemmon Survey	·	1.4 km	MPC · JPL
463644	2013 TO_{130}	—	September 21, 2009	Mount Lemmon	Mount Lemmon Survey	·	2.0 km	MPC · JPL
463645	2013 TE_{132}	—	December 1, 2008	Mount Lemmon	Mount Lemmon Survey	VER	3.1 km	MPC · JPL
463646	2013 TG_{134}	—	April 29, 2012	Mount Lemmon	Mount Lemmon Survey	·	1.5 km	MPC · JPL
463647	2013 TG_{136}	—	November 9, 2009	Mount Lemmon	Mount Lemmon Survey	·	2.0 km	MPC · JPL
463648	2013 TD_{140}	—	March 10, 2011	Kitt Peak	Spacewatch	KOR	1.3 km	MPC · JPL
463649	2013 TO_{143}	—	October 27, 2008	Mount Lemmon	Mount Lemmon Survey	·	3.5 km	MPC · JPL
463650	2013 TP_{144}	—	October 10, 2002	Apache Point	SDSS	·	4.7 km	MPC · JPL
463651	2013 TX_{144}	—	March 20, 2010	Mount Lemmon	Mount Lemmon Survey	·	4.1 km	MPC · JPL
463652	2013 TG_{145}	—	August 28, 2013	Mount Lemmon	Mount Lemmon Survey	·	2.3 km	MPC · JPL
463653	2013 TP_{146}	—	August 29, 2006	Kitt Peak	Spacewatch	·	920 m	MPC · JPL
463654	2013 US_{6}	—	September 13, 2013	Mount Lemmon	Mount Lemmon Survey	·	3.4 km	MPC · JPL
463655	2013 UH_{13}	—	August 24, 1998	Socorro	LINEAR	·	1.5 km	MPC · JPL
463656	2013 VA_{7}	—	July 28, 2008	Mount Lemmon	Mount Lemmon Survey	·	2.8 km	MPC · JPL
463657	2013 WA_{24}	—	September 15, 2002	Palomar	NEAT	EOS	1.8 km	MPC · JPL
463658	2013 WR_{35}	—	October 29, 2003	Kitt Peak	Spacewatch	·	2.4 km	MPC · JPL
463659	2013 WC_{67}	—	July 21, 2012	Siding Spring	SSS	·	2.5 km	MPC · JPL
463660	2013 WB_{89}	—	December 4, 2008	Kitt Peak	Spacewatch	·	3.0 km	MPC · JPL
463661	2013 WC_{108}	—	October 7, 2008	Mount Lemmon	Mount Lemmon Survey	·	3.4 km	MPC · JPL
463662	2013 YO_{24}	—	May 18, 2010	WISE	WISE	·	3.6 km	MPC · JPL
463663	2014 HY_{123}	—	December 13, 2013	Mount Lemmon	Mount Lemmon Survey	centaur	30 km	MPC · JPL
463664	2014 JY_{24}	—	May 4, 2014	Mount Lemmon	Mount Lemmon Survey	APO	870 m	MPC · JPL
463665	2014 LC_{16}	—	October 15, 2004	Mount Lemmon	Mount Lemmon Survey	·	700 m	MPC · JPL
463666	2014 LH_{26}	—	February 24, 2009	Kitt Peak	Spacewatch	·	500 m	MPC · JPL
463667	2014 LG_{27}	—	September 28, 1997	Kitt Peak	Spacewatch	H	310 m	MPC · JPL
463668	2014 MV_{51}	—	July 25, 2006	Mount Lemmon	Mount Lemmon Survey	·	1.6 km	MPC · JPL
463669	2014 NB_{41}	—	February 3, 2008	Kitt Peak	Spacewatch	H	420 m	MPC · JPL
463670	2014 NL_{46}	—	August 26, 2009	Catalina	CSS	H	490 m	MPC · JPL
463671	2014 OJ_{2}	—	October 27, 2011	Catalina	CSS	·	620 m	MPC · JPL
463672	2014 OR_{32}	—	September 4, 2008	Kitt Peak	Spacewatch	·	580 m	MPC · JPL
463673	2014 OM_{45}	—	August 31, 2000	Kitt Peak	Spacewatch	·	560 m	MPC · JPL
463674	2014 OC_{84}	—	August 22, 2004	Kitt Peak	Spacewatch	·	700 m	MPC · JPL
463675	2014 OX_{85}	—	September 17, 2010	Catalina	CSS	·	1.4 km	MPC · JPL
463676	2014 OJ_{91}	—	September 10, 2007	Catalina	CSS	·	850 m	MPC · JPL
463677	2014 OY_{97}	—	December 29, 2008	Mount Lemmon	Mount Lemmon Survey	V	520 m	MPC · JPL
463678	2014 OP_{98}	—	October 7, 2010	Catalina	CSS	·	1.2 km	MPC · JPL
463679	2014 OS_{118}	—	October 9, 2005	Kitt Peak	Spacewatch	·	770 m	MPC · JPL
463680	2014 OX_{126}	—	October 24, 1995	Kitt Peak	Spacewatch	·	950 m	MPC · JPL
463681	2014 OJ_{187}	—	November 15, 2007	Mount Lemmon	Mount Lemmon Survey	·	1.3 km	MPC · JPL
463682	2014 OQ_{187}	—	July 29, 2005	Palomar	NEAT	·	1.9 km	MPC · JPL
463683	2014 OQ_{188}	—	October 4, 2006	Mount Lemmon	Mount Lemmon Survey	(5)	1.0 km	MPC · JPL
463684	2014 OU_{188}	—	September 7, 1999	Kitt Peak	Spacewatch	NYS	1.2 km	MPC · JPL
463685	2014 OY_{190}	—	September 18, 2001	Kitt Peak	Spacewatch	·	1.5 km	MPC · JPL
463686	2014 OA_{192}	—	October 28, 2005	Mount Lemmon	Mount Lemmon Survey	·	1.8 km	MPC · JPL
463687	2014 OE_{198}	—	January 15, 2008	Kitt Peak	Spacewatch	NYS	1 km	MPC · JPL
463688	2014 OV_{230}	—	July 4, 2010	Mount Lemmon	Mount Lemmon Survey	·	1.4 km	MPC · JPL
463689	2014 OS_{244}	—	November 17, 2006	Mount Lemmon	Mount Lemmon Survey	·	2.2 km	MPC · JPL
463690	2014 OG_{295}	—	August 19, 2006	Kitt Peak	Spacewatch	·	1.2 km	MPC · JPL
463691	2014 OJ_{296}	—	February 1, 2012	Mount Lemmon	Mount Lemmon Survey	V	570 m	MPC · JPL
463692	2014 OQ_{296}	—	September 9, 2007	Mount Lemmon	Mount Lemmon Survey	·	910 m	MPC · JPL
463693	2014 ON_{298}	—	November 25, 2006	Mount Lemmon	Mount Lemmon Survey	·	1.1 km	MPC · JPL
463694	2014 OY_{360}	—	October 22, 2003	Kitt Peak	Spacewatch	·	1.1 km	MPC · JPL
463695	2014 OS_{383}	—	February 3, 2008	Kitt Peak	Spacewatch	H	380 m	MPC · JPL
463696	2014 PO_{5}	—	September 15, 2006	Kitt Peak	Spacewatch	(5)	980 m	MPC · JPL
463697	2014 PA_{15}	—	January 13, 2013	Catalina	CSS	H	550 m	MPC · JPL
463698	2014 PU_{23}	—	September 23, 2003	Palomar	NEAT	·	1.1 km	MPC · JPL
463699	2014 PD_{30}	—	December 27, 2002	Socorro	LINEAR	·	1.4 km	MPC · JPL
463700	2014 PP_{30}	—	November 5, 2007	Kitt Peak	Spacewatch	MAS	560 m	MPC · JPL

== 463701–463800 ==
back to top

Designation			Discovery			Properties		Ref
Permanent	Provisional	Named after	Date	Site	Discoverer(s)	Category	Diam.	Ref
463701	2014 PY_{37}	—	October 20, 2003	Socorro	LINEAR	NYS	1.2 km	MPC · JPL
463702	2014 PU_{41}	—	February 3, 2009	Kitt Peak	Spacewatch	·	760 m	MPC · JPL
463703	2014 PL_{65}	—	September 23, 2006	Siding Spring	SSS	·	1.5 km	MPC · JPL
463704	2014 QW_{22}	—	September 30, 2003	Kitt Peak	Spacewatch	·	1.5 km	MPC · JPL
463705	2014 QM_{101}	—	December 28, 2005	Mount Lemmon	Mount Lemmon Survey	·	530 m	MPC · JPL
463706	2014 QJ_{135}	—	September 3, 2010	Mount Lemmon	Mount Lemmon Survey	EUN	900 m	MPC · JPL
463707	2014 QQ_{151}	—	December 11, 2001	Socorro	LINEAR	·	2.1 km	MPC · JPL
463708	2014 QC_{167}	—	September 27, 2005	Palomar	NEAT	·	1.5 km	MPC · JPL
463709	2014 QW_{167}	—	September 19, 2001	Apache Point	SDSS	EUN	1.1 km	MPC · JPL
463710	2014 QF_{168}	—	April 30, 2008	Mount Lemmon	Mount Lemmon Survey	·	2.6 km	MPC · JPL
463711	2014 QO_{171}	—	August 29, 2006	Kitt Peak	Spacewatch	·	1.1 km	MPC · JPL
463712	2014 QM_{176}	—	August 6, 2010	WISE	WISE	·	1.5 km	MPC · JPL
463713	2014 QO_{176}	—	February 27, 2009	Kitt Peak	Spacewatch	·	560 m	MPC · JPL
463714	2014 QN_{179}	—	February 26, 2009	Kitt Peak	Spacewatch	·	690 m	MPC · JPL
463715	2014 QK_{205}	—	October 19, 2003	Kitt Peak	Spacewatch	·	2.7 km	MPC · JPL
463716	2014 QP_{211}	—	January 26, 2006	Mount Lemmon	Mount Lemmon Survey	·	520 m	MPC · JPL
463717	2014 QP_{213}	—	March 14, 1999	Kitt Peak	Spacewatch	·	1.3 km	MPC · JPL
463718	2014 QV_{225}	—	September 4, 2010	Mount Lemmon	Mount Lemmon Survey	·	820 m	MPC · JPL
463719	2014 QY_{233}	—	September 28, 2006	Kitt Peak	Spacewatch	·	990 m	MPC · JPL
463720	2014 QK_{235}	—	March 1, 2009	Kitt Peak	Spacewatch	·	800 m	MPC · JPL
463721	2014 QW_{260}	—	October 10, 2002	Apache Point	SDSS	·	1.5 km	MPC · JPL
463722	2014 QY_{267}	—	November 8, 2007	Mount Lemmon	Mount Lemmon Survey	NYS	1.2 km	MPC · JPL
463723	2014 QW_{284}	—	December 20, 2000	Kitt Peak	Spacewatch	PHO	830 m	MPC · JPL
463724	2014 QR_{292}	—	September 25, 2006	Catalina	CSS	MAR	1.4 km	MPC · JPL
463725	2014 QL_{297}	—	May 4, 2010	Kitt Peak	Spacewatch	·	950 m	MPC · JPL
463726	2014 QA_{307}	—	March 2, 2006	Kitt Peak	Spacewatch	V	580 m	MPC · JPL
463727	2014 QK_{316}	—	November 29, 2000	Socorro	LINEAR	·	1.1 km	MPC · JPL
463728	2014 QE_{320}	—	January 16, 2005	Kitt Peak	Spacewatch	·	710 m	MPC · JPL
463729	2014 QX_{322}	—	September 11, 2007	Mount Lemmon	Mount Lemmon Survey	·	570 m	MPC · JPL
463730	2014 QW_{329}	—	April 27, 2012	Kitt Peak	Spacewatch	·	3.3 km	MPC · JPL
463731	2014 QQ_{330}	—	October 2, 2000	Anderson Mesa	LONEOS	·	740 m	MPC · JPL
463732	2014 QE_{348}	—	December 15, 2004	Kitt Peak	Spacewatch	·	1.1 km	MPC · JPL
463733	2014 QH_{354}	—	February 21, 2009	Kitt Peak	Spacewatch	·	1.2 km	MPC · JPL
463734	2014 QJ_{354}	—	January 27, 2006	Mount Lemmon	Mount Lemmon Survey	·	800 m	MPC · JPL
463735	2014 QA_{355}	—	September 11, 2007	Mount Lemmon	Mount Lemmon Survey	V	420 m	MPC · JPL
463736	2014 QQ_{368}	—	August 25, 2014	Haleakala	Pan-STARRS 1	·	1.4 km	MPC · JPL
463737	2014 QU_{373}	—	January 31, 2009	Mount Lemmon	Mount Lemmon Survey	V	550 m	MPC · JPL
463738	2014 QL_{378}	—	February 26, 2009	Catalina	CSS	·	730 m	MPC · JPL
463739	2014 QP_{385}	—	August 11, 2007	Anderson Mesa	LONEOS	·	640 m	MPC · JPL
463740	2014 QA_{396}	—	February 1, 2009	Kitt Peak	Spacewatch	·	660 m	MPC · JPL
463741	2014 QP_{397}	—	October 8, 2007	Mount Lemmon	Mount Lemmon Survey	·	730 m	MPC · JPL
463742	2014 QU_{398}	—	September 30, 2006	Mount Lemmon	Mount Lemmon Survey	H	380 m	MPC · JPL
463743	2014 QY_{400}	—	February 22, 2009	Kitt Peak	Spacewatch	V	660 m	MPC · JPL
463744	2014 QK_{410}	—	August 19, 2006	Kitt Peak	Spacewatch	·	820 m	MPC · JPL
463745	2014 QT_{423}	—	October 15, 2004	Mount Lemmon	Mount Lemmon Survey	·	1.0 km	MPC · JPL
463746	2014 QD_{424}	—	April 22, 2007	Kitt Peak	Spacewatch	·	750 m	MPC · JPL
463747	2014 QF_{432}	—	September 30, 2005	Mount Lemmon	Mount Lemmon Survey	·	1.5 km	MPC · JPL
463748	2014 QO_{432}	—	December 2, 2010	Mount Lemmon	Mount Lemmon Survey	(5)	1.4 km	MPC · JPL
463749	2014 RV_{12}	—	July 26, 2011	Siding Spring	SSS	H	770 m	MPC · JPL
463750	2014 RB_{26}	—	October 18, 2003	Kitt Peak	Spacewatch	·	840 m	MPC · JPL
463751	2014 RL_{29}	—	September 14, 1999	Socorro	LINEAR	PHO	810 m	MPC · JPL
463752	2014 RJ_{32}	—	December 5, 2007	Mount Lemmon	Mount Lemmon Survey	MAS	600 m	MPC · JPL
463753	2014 RW_{35}	—	November 5, 2007	Kitt Peak	Spacewatch	·	930 m	MPC · JPL
463754	2014 RX_{48}	—	September 30, 2005	Mount Lemmon	Mount Lemmon Survey	·	1.6 km	MPC · JPL
463755	2014 RR_{60}	—	September 25, 2006	Kitt Peak	Spacewatch	H	390 m	MPC · JPL
463756	2014 RP_{61}	—	January 17, 2007	Kitt Peak	Spacewatch	·	2.7 km	MPC · JPL
463757	2014 ST	—	April 10, 2010	WISE	WISE	·	2.7 km	MPC · JPL
463758	2014 SC_{5}	—	October 28, 2005	Catalina	CSS	·	1.7 km	MPC · JPL
463759	2014 SD_{24}	—	January 17, 2005	Kitt Peak	Spacewatch	NYS	1.1 km	MPC · JPL
463760	2014 SM_{92}	—	March 9, 2006	Kitt Peak	Spacewatch	·	580 m	MPC · JPL
463761	2014 SA_{96}	—	January 4, 2011	Mount Lemmon	Mount Lemmon Survey	·	1.4 km	MPC · JPL
463762	2014 SL_{96}	—	November 10, 2004	Kitt Peak	Spacewatch	·	660 m	MPC · JPL
463763	2014 SG_{98}	—	April 22, 2009	Mount Lemmon	Mount Lemmon Survey	NYS	1.0 km	MPC · JPL
463764	2014 SZ_{108}	—	October 11, 2007	Mount Lemmon	Mount Lemmon Survey	·	790 m	MPC · JPL
463765	2014 SU_{111}	—	December 15, 2006	Kitt Peak	Spacewatch	MIS	2.0 km	MPC · JPL
463766	2014 SX_{139}	—	February 28, 2008	Mount Lemmon	Mount Lemmon Survey	·	820 m	MPC · JPL
463767	2014 SK_{154}	—	September 16, 2009	Kitt Peak	Spacewatch	·	2.0 km	MPC · JPL
463768	2014 SK_{158}	—	September 22, 2009	Mount Lemmon	Mount Lemmon Survey	HOF	2.6 km	MPC · JPL
463769	2014 SW_{163}	—	October 4, 2007	Catalina	CSS	V	730 m	MPC · JPL
463770	2014 SX_{179}	—	October 17, 2010	Mount Lemmon	Mount Lemmon Survey	·	1.4 km	MPC · JPL
463771	2014 ST_{180}	—	March 13, 2012	Mount Lemmon	Mount Lemmon Survey	·	2.0 km	MPC · JPL
463772	2014 SK_{183}	—	March 6, 2008	Mount Lemmon	Mount Lemmon Survey	(5)	1.3 km	MPC · JPL
463773	2014 SW_{188}	—	March 23, 2006	Kitt Peak	Spacewatch	·	680 m	MPC · JPL
463774	2014 SN_{191}	—	December 14, 2001	Kitt Peak	Spacewatch	·	690 m	MPC · JPL
463775	2014 SO_{205}	—	January 31, 2009	Mount Lemmon	Mount Lemmon Survey	·	620 m	MPC · JPL
463776	2014 SB_{207}	—	April 7, 2008	Mount Lemmon	Mount Lemmon Survey	·	1.9 km	MPC · JPL
463777	2014 SY_{208}	—	January 29, 2011	Kitt Peak	Spacewatch	TEL	1.4 km	MPC · JPL
463778	2014 SC_{213}	—	February 8, 2007	Mount Lemmon	Mount Lemmon Survey	·	2.0 km	MPC · JPL
463779	2014 SL_{218}	—	April 5, 2003	Kitt Peak	Spacewatch	EUN	1.3 km	MPC · JPL
463780	2014 SD_{221}	—	August 6, 2005	Palomar	NEAT	·	2.1 km	MPC · JPL
463781	2014 SM_{222}	—	October 29, 2010	Mount Lemmon	Mount Lemmon Survey	·	1.4 km	MPC · JPL
463782	2014 SV_{227}	—	August 28, 2000	Cerro Tololo	Deep Ecliptic Survey	·	650 m	MPC · JPL
463783	2014 SS_{228}	—	September 1, 2010	Mount Lemmon	Mount Lemmon Survey	NYS	980 m	MPC · JPL
463784	2014 SZ_{231}	—	September 28, 2003	Socorro	LINEAR	·	3.0 km	MPC · JPL
463785	2014 SR_{232}	—	September 28, 2003	Kitt Peak	Spacewatch	THM	1.8 km	MPC · JPL
463786	2014 SP_{235}	—	March 12, 2003	Palomar	NEAT	·	1.4 km	MPC · JPL
463787	2014 SP_{253}	—	December 26, 2006	Kitt Peak	Spacewatch	·	2.0 km	MPC · JPL
463788	2014 SW_{254}	—	December 5, 2007	Kitt Peak	Spacewatch	·	1.1 km	MPC · JPL
463789	2014 SG_{258}	—	April 24, 2003	Kitt Peak	Spacewatch	GEF	1.3 km	MPC · JPL
463790	2014 SP_{266}	—	September 22, 2003	Palomar	NEAT	·	4.0 km	MPC · JPL
463791	2014 SF_{280}	—	November 9, 2009	Catalina	CSS	·	1.2 km	MPC · JPL
463792	2014 SE_{286}	—	November 24, 2006	Mount Lemmon	Mount Lemmon Survey	·	2.4 km	MPC · JPL
463793	2014 SL_{291}	—	December 24, 2006	Mount Lemmon	Mount Lemmon Survey	MRX	900 m	MPC · JPL
463794	2014 SQ_{291}	—	January 14, 2002	Kitt Peak	Spacewatch	·	1.8 km	MPC · JPL
463795	2014 SE_{292}	—	March 29, 2012	Mount Lemmon	Mount Lemmon Survey	ADE	1.8 km	MPC · JPL
463796	2014 SG_{300}	—	October 7, 2005	Kitt Peak	Spacewatch	·	1.5 km	MPC · JPL
463797	2014 SM_{301}	—	November 10, 2005	Catalina	CSS	·	2.5 km	MPC · JPL
463798	2014 SN_{304}	—	September 30, 2005	Catalina	CSS	MRX	1.1 km	MPC · JPL
463799	2014 SD_{309}	—	October 31, 2010	Kitt Peak	Spacewatch	(5)	920 m	MPC · JPL
463800	2014 SV_{320}	—	September 28, 2006	Mount Lemmon	Mount Lemmon Survey	·	1.3 km	MPC · JPL

== 463801–463900 ==
back to top

Designation			Discovery			Properties		Ref
Permanent	Provisional	Named after	Date	Site	Discoverer(s)	Category	Diam.	Ref
463801	2014 SM_{326}	—	February 14, 2005	Kitt Peak	Spacewatch	·	870 m	MPC · JPL
463802	2014 SG_{328}	—	November 23, 2009	Mount Lemmon	Mount Lemmon Survey	EOS	1.8 km	MPC · JPL
463803	2014 SC_{333}	—	February 22, 2007	Catalina	CSS	·	2.6 km	MPC · JPL
463804	2014 SV_{333}	—	March 16, 2007	Mount Lemmon	Mount Lemmon Survey	·	1.8 km	MPC · JPL
463805	2014 SY_{335}	—	April 6, 2008	Mount Lemmon	Mount Lemmon Survey	·	1.2 km	MPC · JPL
463806	2014 SN_{336}	—	March 10, 2008	Kitt Peak	Spacewatch	·	1.4 km	MPC · JPL
463807	2014 SS_{336}	—	March 31, 2008	Mount Lemmon	Mount Lemmon Survey	·	1.3 km	MPC · JPL
463808	2014 SD_{339}	—	March 29, 2008	Kitt Peak	Spacewatch	·	1.5 km	MPC · JPL
463809	2014 SF_{341}	—	September 25, 2005	Kitt Peak	Spacewatch	·	1.5 km	MPC · JPL
463810	2014 SG_{343}	—	December 16, 2007	Kitt Peak	Spacewatch	·	1.4 km	MPC · JPL
463811	2014 SP_{346}	—	October 29, 2005	Kitt Peak	Spacewatch	·	1.7 km	MPC · JPL
463812	2014 TM_{3}	—	March 10, 2002	Kitt Peak	Spacewatch	V	580 m	MPC · JPL
463813	2014 TS_{4}	—	March 27, 2010	WISE	WISE	·	2.2 km	MPC · JPL
463814	2014 TZ_{4}	—	April 6, 2008	Kitt Peak	Spacewatch	·	1.3 km	MPC · JPL
463815	2014 TO_{5}	—	October 24, 2005	Kitt Peak	Spacewatch	·	1.7 km	MPC · JPL
463816	2014 TW_{15}	—	November 2, 2006	Mount Lemmon	Mount Lemmon Survey	(5)	1.1 km	MPC · JPL
463817	2014 TY_{20}	—	September 11, 2010	Mount Lemmon	Mount Lemmon Survey	·	960 m	MPC · JPL
463818	2014 TX_{22}	—	March 10, 2011	Mount Lemmon	Mount Lemmon Survey	·	2.4 km	MPC · JPL
463819	2014 TV_{30}	—	March 28, 2012	Mount Lemmon	Mount Lemmon Survey	·	2.3 km	MPC · JPL
463820	2014 TD_{34}	—	November 20, 2006	Mount Lemmon	Mount Lemmon Survey	H	710 m	MPC · JPL
463821	2014 TW_{41}	—	October 13, 2010	Mount Lemmon	Mount Lemmon Survey	·	900 m	MPC · JPL
463822	2014 TN_{44}	—	October 2, 2003	Kitt Peak	Spacewatch	THM	2.3 km	MPC · JPL
463823	2014 TK_{47}	—	September 29, 2003	Kitt Peak	Spacewatch	·	3.5 km	MPC · JPL
463824	2014 TQ_{49}	—	September 19, 2009	Mount Lemmon	Mount Lemmon Survey	DOR	2.2 km	MPC · JPL
463825	2014 TM_{50}	—	October 13, 2006	Kitt Peak	Spacewatch	·	1.1 km	MPC · JPL
463826	2014 TF_{53}	—	December 5, 2010	Mount Lemmon	Mount Lemmon Survey	(5)	1.2 km	MPC · JPL
463827	2014 TA_{54}	—	October 3, 2006	Mount Lemmon	Mount Lemmon Survey	PHO	1.0 km	MPC · JPL
463828	2014 TD_{55}	—	February 28, 2008	Mount Lemmon	Mount Lemmon Survey	·	1.1 km	MPC · JPL
463829	2014 TU_{55}	—	October 20, 2003	Kitt Peak	Spacewatch	·	2.4 km	MPC · JPL
463830	2014 TK_{59}	—	March 2, 2011	Kitt Peak	Spacewatch	·	2.2 km	MPC · JPL
463831	2014 TB_{61}	—	October 28, 2005	Kitt Peak	Spacewatch	HOF	2.3 km	MPC · JPL
463832	2014 TN_{61}	—	February 23, 2012	Catalina	CSS	PHO	1.1 km	MPC · JPL
463833	2014 TD_{62}	—	September 20, 2001	Kitt Peak	Spacewatch	JUN	970 m	MPC · JPL
463834	2014 TM_{62}	—	January 28, 2007	Mount Lemmon	Mount Lemmon Survey	·	1.8 km	MPC · JPL
463835	2014 TW_{67}	—	October 29, 2010	Mount Lemmon	Mount Lemmon Survey	·	1.3 km	MPC · JPL
463836	2014 TZ_{68}	—	August 6, 2005	Palomar	NEAT	·	1.3 km	MPC · JPL
463837	2014 TO_{70}	—	April 7, 2008	Kitt Peak	Spacewatch	·	1.2 km	MPC · JPL
463838	2014 TX_{73}	—	November 8, 1997	Caussols	ODAS	·	1.7 km	MPC · JPL
463839	2014 TX_{74}	—	December 8, 2005	Kitt Peak	Spacewatch	·	2.0 km	MPC · JPL
463840	2014 TB_{75}	—	September 26, 2003	Apache Point	SDSS	·	2.1 km	MPC · JPL
463841	2014 TY_{75}	—	September 1, 2005	Kitt Peak	Spacewatch	·	1.4 km	MPC · JPL
463842	2014 TN_{79}	—	January 18, 2008	Mount Lemmon	Mount Lemmon Survey	·	1.3 km	MPC · JPL
463843	2014 TP_{81}	—	January 28, 2011	Catalina	CSS	·	2.4 km	MPC · JPL
463844	2014 TV_{84}	—	May 29, 2006	Kitt Peak	Spacewatch	·	3.3 km	MPC · JPL
463845	2014 UK_{1}	—	November 9, 2009	Kitt Peak	Spacewatch	·	1.8 km	MPC · JPL
463846	2014 UL_{1}	—	September 18, 2003	Kitt Peak	Spacewatch	·	1.9 km	MPC · JPL
463847	2014 UU_{1}	—	September 20, 2003	Kitt Peak	Spacewatch	EOS	1.6 km	MPC · JPL
463848	2014 UB_{5}	—	December 23, 2006	Mount Lemmon	Mount Lemmon Survey	·	1.8 km	MPC · JPL
463849	2014 UU_{8}	—	October 26, 2005	Kitt Peak	Spacewatch	·	1.9 km	MPC · JPL
463850	2014 UO_{12}	—	March 17, 2001	Kitt Peak	Spacewatch	EOS	2.2 km	MPC · JPL
463851	2014 UP_{12}	—	November 12, 2005	Kitt Peak	Spacewatch	HOF	2.7 km	MPC · JPL
463852	2014 US_{12}	—	March 2, 2006	Mount Lemmon	Mount Lemmon Survey	·	3.4 km	MPC · JPL
463853	2014 UZ_{12}	—	June 9, 2012	Mount Lemmon	Mount Lemmon Survey	·	2.3 km	MPC · JPL
463854	2014 UL_{13}	—	October 22, 2009	Mount Lemmon	Mount Lemmon Survey	·	2.2 km	MPC · JPL
463855	2014 UX_{15}	—	October 8, 2007	Catalina	CSS	·	800 m	MPC · JPL
463856	2014 UN_{17}	—	February 5, 2011	Catalina	CSS	EOS	2.0 km	MPC · JPL
463857	2014 UO_{18}	—	January 13, 2008	Mount Lemmon	Mount Lemmon Survey	CLA	1.5 km	MPC · JPL
463858	2014 UT_{19}	—	March 22, 2012	Mount Lemmon	Mount Lemmon Survey	·	1.5 km	MPC · JPL
463859	2014 UV_{19}	—	February 8, 2002	Kitt Peak	Spacewatch	·	880 m	MPC · JPL
463860	2014 UL_{20}	—	November 17, 2006	Kitt Peak	Spacewatch	·	1.3 km	MPC · JPL
463861	2014 UC_{22}	—	November 23, 2009	Mount Lemmon	Mount Lemmon Survey	·	2.4 km	MPC · JPL
463862	2014 UD_{22}	—	November 16, 2009	Mount Lemmon	Mount Lemmon Survey	·	2.2 km	MPC · JPL
463863	2014 UH_{23}	—	October 11, 2007	Catalina	CSS	·	730 m	MPC · JPL
463864	2014 UP_{23}	—	December 18, 2001	Socorro	LINEAR	·	2.3 km	MPC · JPL
463865	2014 UX_{23}	—	November 7, 2010	Mount Lemmon	Mount Lemmon Survey	·	1.7 km	MPC · JPL
463866	2014 US_{28}	—	January 10, 2011	Mount Lemmon	Mount Lemmon Survey	EOS	2.4 km	MPC · JPL
463867	2014 UR_{30}	—	October 29, 2005	Kitt Peak	Spacewatch	NEM	2.0 km	MPC · JPL
463868	2014 US_{31}	—	July 29, 2008	Mount Lemmon	Mount Lemmon Survey	·	1.6 km	MPC · JPL
463869	2014 UT_{32}	—	July 17, 2004	Cerro Tololo	Deep Ecliptic Survey	HOF	2.3 km	MPC · JPL
463870	2014 UK_{41}	—	October 5, 2005	Kitt Peak	Spacewatch	·	1.7 km	MPC · JPL
463871	2014 UT_{41}	—	December 7, 2005	Kitt Peak	Spacewatch	·	1.7 km	MPC · JPL
463872	2014 UN_{42}	—	April 28, 2006	Cerro Tololo	Deep Ecliptic Survey	·	880 m	MPC · JPL
463873	2014 UX_{43}	—	January 26, 2006	Mount Lemmon	Mount Lemmon Survey	·	730 m	MPC · JPL
463874	2014 UM_{44}	—	March 5, 2008	Mount Lemmon	Mount Lemmon Survey	·	1.1 km	MPC · JPL
463875	2014 UO_{46}	—	October 1, 2005	Mount Lemmon	Mount Lemmon Survey	WIT	1.1 km	MPC · JPL
463876	2014 UG_{47}	—	October 23, 2003	Kitt Peak	Spacewatch	EOS	1.9 km	MPC · JPL
463877	2014 UD_{48}	—	November 18, 2009	Kitt Peak	Spacewatch	·	1.8 km	MPC · JPL
463878	2014 UP_{50}	—	September 20, 2003	Palomar	NEAT	·	2.0 km	MPC · JPL
463879	2014 UE_{51}	—	September 19, 2001	Kitt Peak	Spacewatch	·	1.2 km	MPC · JPL
463880	2014 UT_{51}	—	June 4, 2013	Mount Lemmon	Mount Lemmon Survey	·	980 m	MPC · JPL
463881	2014 UG_{53}	—	October 30, 2005	Kitt Peak	Spacewatch	·	1.7 km	MPC · JPL
463882	2014 UN_{53}	—	September 25, 2003	Palomar	NEAT	·	2.5 km	MPC · JPL
463883	2014 UQ_{65}	—	February 27, 2012	Catalina	CSS	·	1.5 km	MPC · JPL
463884	2014 UX_{66}	—	November 18, 2003	Kitt Peak	Spacewatch	·	2.5 km	MPC · JPL
463885	2014 UY_{76}	—	January 28, 2007	Kitt Peak	Spacewatch	·	1.4 km	MPC · JPL
463886	2014 UO_{84}	—	February 22, 2001	Nogales	P. R. Holvorcem, M. Schwartz	KOR	1.5 km	MPC · JPL
463887	2014 UJ_{85}	—	November 24, 2006	Kitt Peak	Spacewatch	·	1.1 km	MPC · JPL
463888	2014 UA_{89}	—	October 21, 2006	Kitt Peak	Spacewatch	·	1.3 km	MPC · JPL
463889	2014 UD_{90}	—	December 5, 2010	Kitt Peak	Spacewatch	·	1.6 km	MPC · JPL
463890	2014 UY_{91}	—	September 15, 1998	Kitt Peak	Spacewatch	·	610 m	MPC · JPL
463891	2014 UZ_{93}	—	August 10, 2010	Kitt Peak	Spacewatch	(5)	1.4 km	MPC · JPL
463892	2014 UB_{96}	—	August 31, 2005	Kitt Peak	Spacewatch	·	1.3 km	MPC · JPL
463893	2014 UY_{97}	—	May 23, 2012	Mount Lemmon	Mount Lemmon Survey	EOS	1.8 km	MPC · JPL
463894	2014 UA_{99}	—	October 14, 2007	Mount Lemmon	Mount Lemmon Survey	·	1.1 km	MPC · JPL
463895	2014 UW_{99}	—	October 24, 2001	Kitt Peak	Spacewatch	·	1.9 km	MPC · JPL
463896	2014 UM_{100}	—	October 14, 2001	Apache Point	SDSS	·	1.4 km	MPC · JPL
463897	2014 UK_{103}	—	February 25, 2007	Kitt Peak	Spacewatch	HOF	2.3 km	MPC · JPL
463898	2014 UH_{108}	—	March 29, 2009	Kitt Peak	Spacewatch	·	1.3 km	MPC · JPL
463899	2014 US_{108}	—	December 4, 2010	Mount Lemmon	Mount Lemmon Survey	·	2.0 km	MPC · JPL
463900	2014 UT_{108}	—	August 10, 2004	Campo Imperatore	CINEOS	AGN	1.1 km	MPC · JPL

== 463901–464000 ==
back to top

Designation			Discovery			Properties		Ref
Permanent	Provisional	Named after	Date	Site	Discoverer(s)	Category	Diam.	Ref
463901	2014 UM_{112}	—	May 4, 2008	Kitt Peak	Spacewatch	·	2.0 km	MPC · JPL
463902	2014 UB_{117}	—	November 29, 2011	Kitt Peak	Spacewatch	·	990 m	MPC · JPL
463903	2014 UD_{118}	—	September 18, 2010	Mount Lemmon	Mount Lemmon Survey	(5)	1.4 km	MPC · JPL
463904	2014 UN_{118}	—	November 8, 2010	Catalina	CSS	EUN	1.1 km	MPC · JPL
463905	2014 UR_{119}	—	October 4, 2007	Kitt Peak	Spacewatch	·	670 m	MPC · JPL
463906	2014 UR_{120}	—	April 17, 2005	Kitt Peak	Spacewatch	·	1.1 km	MPC · JPL
463907	2014 US_{120}	—	October 17, 2001	Kitt Peak	Spacewatch	·	1.4 km	MPC · JPL
463908	2014 UO_{121}	—	September 3, 2005	Palomar	NEAT	·	2.4 km	MPC · JPL
463909	2014 US_{124}	—	September 6, 2008	Mount Lemmon	Mount Lemmon Survey	·	2.2 km	MPC · JPL
463910	2014 UN_{126}	—	March 6, 2008	Kitt Peak	Spacewatch	·	1.4 km	MPC · JPL
463911	2014 UW_{130}	—	September 4, 2010	Kitt Peak	Spacewatch	·	1.1 km	MPC · JPL
463912	2014 UA_{132}	—	March 5, 2002	Kitt Peak	Spacewatch	DOR	1.6 km	MPC · JPL
463913	2014 UP_{132}	—	May 24, 2006	Kitt Peak	Spacewatch	NAE	3.3 km	MPC · JPL
463914	2014 UL_{135}	—	May 16, 2004	Siding Spring	SSS	·	1.9 km	MPC · JPL
463915	2014 UR_{136}	—	November 23, 1997	Kitt Peak	Spacewatch	·	1.1 km	MPC · JPL
463916	2014 UL_{137}	—	May 28, 2000	Socorro	LINEAR	·	1.7 km	MPC · JPL
463917	2014 UY_{138}	—	August 15, 2009	Catalina	CSS	·	2.1 km	MPC · JPL
463918	2014 UN_{142}	—	November 25, 2002	Palomar	NEAT	·	1.5 km	MPC · JPL
463919	2014 UN_{143}	—	October 14, 2010	Mount Lemmon	Mount Lemmon Survey	·	1.4 km	MPC · JPL
463920	2014 UU_{147}	—	February 22, 2003	Kitt Peak	Spacewatch	·	1.2 km	MPC · JPL
463921	2014 UD_{149}	—	April 7, 2013	Mount Lemmon	Mount Lemmon Survey	·	740 m	MPC · JPL
463922	2014 UR_{150}	—	November 19, 2003	Kitt Peak	Spacewatch	LIX	2.9 km	MPC · JPL
463923	2014 US_{153}	—	November 18, 2003	Kitt Peak	Spacewatch	·	1.2 km	MPC · JPL
463924	2014 UG_{156}	—	January 27, 2007	Mount Lemmon	Mount Lemmon Survey	AGN	1.3 km	MPC · JPL
463925	2014 UV_{157}	—	November 24, 2009	Kitt Peak	Spacewatch	·	2.2 km	MPC · JPL
463926	2014 UY_{162}	—	January 13, 2011	Mount Lemmon	Mount Lemmon Survey	NEM	1.6 km	MPC · JPL
463927	2014 UP_{163}	—	January 10, 2011	Catalina	CSS	·	2.7 km	MPC · JPL
463928	2014 UF_{167}	—	October 13, 2001	Socorro	LINEAR	·	1.6 km	MPC · JPL
463929	2014 UU_{169}	—	July 28, 2005	Palomar	NEAT	EUN	1.7 km	MPC · JPL
463930	2014 UA_{180}	—	December 20, 2004	Mount Lemmon	Mount Lemmon Survey	·	720 m	MPC · JPL
463931	2014 UB_{183}	—	August 18, 2009	Kitt Peak	Spacewatch	HOF	2.7 km	MPC · JPL
463932	2014 UB_{184}	—	March 28, 2012	Mount Lemmon	Mount Lemmon Survey	·	1.5 km	MPC · JPL
463933	2014 UE_{185}	—	January 13, 2005	Catalina	CSS	·	3.0 km	MPC · JPL
463934	2014 UJ_{187}	—	March 24, 2006	Mount Lemmon	Mount Lemmon Survey	·	4.2 km	MPC · JPL
463935	2014 UZ_{189}	—	December 8, 2010	Kitt Peak	Spacewatch	·	1.4 km	MPC · JPL
463936	2014 UV_{192}	—	July 27, 2005	Palomar	NEAT	·	1.7 km	MPC · JPL
463937	2014 UT_{193}	—	January 20, 2002	Kitt Peak	Spacewatch	·	2.1 km	MPC · JPL
463938	2014 UE_{195}	—	November 18, 2006	Mount Lemmon	Mount Lemmon Survey	·	1.4 km	MPC · JPL
463939	2014 UD_{197}	—	September 17, 2010	Mount Lemmon	Mount Lemmon Survey	·	1.2 km	MPC · JPL
463940	2014 UE_{198}	—	October 18, 2003	Kitt Peak	Spacewatch	·	2.7 km	MPC · JPL
463941	2014 UK_{198}	—	September 16, 2009	Kitt Peak	Spacewatch	·	1.5 km	MPC · JPL
463942	2014 UV_{201}	—	December 13, 2010	Mount Lemmon	Mount Lemmon Survey	·	1.5 km	MPC · JPL
463943	2014 UM_{203}	—	April 29, 2012	Kitt Peak	Spacewatch	·	2.0 km	MPC · JPL
463944	2014 UM_{204}	—	September 21, 2009	Mount Lemmon	Mount Lemmon Survey	·	1.6 km	MPC · JPL
463945	2014 UC_{208}	—	November 16, 2010	Mount Lemmon	Mount Lemmon Survey	·	1.5 km	MPC · JPL
463946	2014 UV_{209}	—	October 11, 2007	Kitt Peak	Spacewatch	V	540 m	MPC · JPL
463947	2014 UN_{214}	—	May 21, 2006	Kitt Peak	Spacewatch	·	3.3 km	MPC · JPL
463948	2014 UT_{214}	—	July 24, 2003	Palomar	NEAT	·	3.2 km	MPC · JPL
463949	2014 US_{215}	—	September 13, 2007	Mount Lemmon	Mount Lemmon Survey	·	800 m	MPC · JPL
463950	2014 VH	—	November 29, 2005	Kitt Peak	Spacewatch	·	2.3 km	MPC · JPL
463951	2014 VV	—	December 18, 2003	Socorro	LINEAR	THB	3.5 km	MPC · JPL
463952	2014 VX_{3}	—	March 21, 2012	Mount Lemmon	Mount Lemmon Survey	MAR	920 m	MPC · JPL
463953	2014 VQ_{5}	—	March 15, 2004	Kitt Peak	Spacewatch	·	1.1 km	MPC · JPL
463954	2014 VY_{5}	—	September 24, 2003	Haleakala	NEAT	NYS	960 m	MPC · JPL
463955	2014 VW_{7}	—	March 16, 2005	Mount Lemmon	Mount Lemmon Survey	·	1.1 km	MPC · JPL
463956	2014 VC_{9}	—	November 19, 2003	Kitt Peak	Spacewatch	NYS	1.2 km	MPC · JPL
463957	2014 VC_{12}	—	April 28, 2008	Mount Lemmon	Mount Lemmon Survey	·	2.4 km	MPC · JPL
463958	2014 VU_{13}	—	September 15, 2002	Palomar	NEAT	·	3.5 km	MPC · JPL
463959	2014 VE_{14}	—	October 20, 2003	Socorro	LINEAR	·	3.6 km	MPC · JPL
463960	2014 VS_{17}	—	April 26, 2006	Cerro Tololo	Deep Ecliptic Survey	·	2.1 km	MPC · JPL
463961	2014 VC_{22}	—	April 30, 2000	Kitt Peak	Spacewatch	·	3.3 km	MPC · JPL
463962	2014 VL_{23}	—	February 7, 2006	Kitt Peak	Spacewatch	EOS	2.3 km	MPC · JPL
463963	2014 VX_{24}	—	September 24, 2008	Mount Lemmon	Mount Lemmon Survey	VER	2.6 km	MPC · JPL
463964	2014 VY_{24}	—	September 28, 2003	Apache Point	SDSS	·	2.2 km	MPC · JPL
463965	2014 VA_{27}	—	November 21, 2005	Kitt Peak	Spacewatch	·	1.8 km	MPC · JPL
463966	2014 VN_{27}	—	September 23, 2008	Catalina	CSS	THB	3.7 km	MPC · JPL
463967	2014 VS_{31}	—	October 28, 2008	Mount Lemmon	Mount Lemmon Survey	VER	2.6 km	MPC · JPL
463968	2014 VQ_{32}	—	August 31, 2002	Anderson Mesa	LONEOS	NYS	1.5 km	MPC · JPL
463969	2014 WR	—	September 28, 2003	Kitt Peak	Spacewatch	·	2.3 km	MPC · JPL
463970	2014 WW_{2}	—	March 28, 2011	Catalina	CSS	·	3.2 km	MPC · JPL
463971	2014 WS_{3}	—	December 16, 2011	Mount Lemmon	Mount Lemmon Survey	·	780 m	MPC · JPL
463972	2014 WB_{5}	—	May 12, 2013	Mount Lemmon	Mount Lemmon Survey	·	1.7 km	MPC · JPL
463973	2014 WF_{5}	—	December 5, 2005	Kitt Peak	Spacewatch	AGN	1.2 km	MPC · JPL
463974	2014 WY_{9}	—	October 21, 2006	Kitt Peak	Spacewatch	·	1.2 km	MPC · JPL
463975	2014 WO_{16}	—	December 28, 2003	Socorro	LINEAR	·	3.4 km	MPC · JPL
463976	2014 WN_{17}	—	September 19, 2009	Kitt Peak	Spacewatch	·	1.8 km	MPC · JPL
463977	2014 WW_{20}	—	October 4, 2006	Mount Lemmon	Mount Lemmon Survey	·	1.3 km	MPC · JPL
463978	2014 WM_{26}	—	April 24, 2001	Kitt Peak	Spacewatch	·	1.5 km	MPC · JPL
463979	2014 WF_{35}	—	November 18, 2003	Kitt Peak	Spacewatch	·	2.6 km	MPC · JPL
463980	2014 WN_{40}	—	September 11, 2004	Kitt Peak	Spacewatch	·	580 m	MPC · JPL
463981	2014 WK_{41}	—	February 14, 2010	Catalina	CSS	·	3.0 km	MPC · JPL
463982	2014 WR_{41}	—	November 26, 2009	Mount Lemmon	Mount Lemmon Survey	·	1.6 km	MPC · JPL
463983	2014 WE_{42}	—	April 6, 2008	Kitt Peak	Spacewatch	·	1.3 km	MPC · JPL
463984	2014 WZ_{46}	—	February 23, 2012	Mount Lemmon	Mount Lemmon Survey	V	730 m	MPC · JPL
463985	2014 WU_{47}	—	January 31, 2006	Kitt Peak	Spacewatch	KOR	1.2 km	MPC · JPL
463986	2014 WN_{48}	—	November 16, 2009	Mount Lemmon	Mount Lemmon Survey	KOR	1.1 km	MPC · JPL
463987	2014 WC_{50}	—	October 1, 2005	Mount Lemmon	Mount Lemmon Survey	WIT	940 m	MPC · JPL
463988	2014 WE_{50}	—	January 26, 2006	Mount Lemmon	Mount Lemmon Survey	KOR	1.2 km	MPC · JPL
463989	2014 WH_{50}	—	December 27, 2006	Mount Lemmon	Mount Lemmon Survey	·	1.7 km	MPC · JPL
463990	2014 WZ_{50}	—	October 9, 1993	Kitt Peak	Spacewatch	·	1.2 km	MPC · JPL
463991	2014 WB_{51}	—	October 22, 2003	Kitt Peak	Spacewatch	·	2.6 km	MPC · JPL
463992	2014 WK_{51}	—	October 28, 2005	Mount Lemmon	Mount Lemmon Survey	·	1.6 km	MPC · JPL
463993	2014 WL_{51}	—	October 11, 2007	Kitt Peak	Spacewatch	·	730 m	MPC · JPL
463994	2014 WX_{57}	—	March 2, 2006	Kitt Peak	Spacewatch	·	2.0 km	MPC · JPL
463995	2014 WY_{59}	—	August 24, 2001	Kitt Peak	Spacewatch	·	1.1 km	MPC · JPL
463996	2014 WL_{61}	—	November 14, 2010	Mount Lemmon	Mount Lemmon Survey	·	1.3 km	MPC · JPL
463997	2014 WY_{65}	—	May 1, 2009	Mount Lemmon	Mount Lemmon Survey	·	1.1 km	MPC · JPL
463998	2014 WB_{67}	—	November 20, 2003	Socorro	LINEAR	·	2.7 km	MPC · JPL
463999	2014 WC_{67}	—	April 4, 2005	Kitt Peak	Spacewatch	·	3.1 km	MPC · JPL
464000	2014 WG_{69}	—	October 10, 2001	Kitt Peak	Spacewatch	·	2.1 km	MPC · JPL

back to top

== Meaning of names ==
As minor planet discoveries are confirmed, they are given a permanent number by the IAU's Minor Planet Center (MPC), and the discoverers can then submit names for them, following the IAU's naming conventions. The list below concerns those minor planets in the specified number-range that have received names, and explains the meanings of those names.

Official naming citations of newly named small Solar System bodies are approved and published in a bulletin by IAU's Working Group for Small Bodies Nomenclature (WGSBN). Before May 2021, citations were published in MPC's Minor Planet Circulars for many decades. Recent citations can also be found on the JPL Small-Body Database (SBDB). Until his death in 2016, German astronomer Lutz D. Schmadel compiled these citations into the Dictionary of Minor Planet Names (DMP) and regularly updated the collection.

Based on Paul Herget's The Names of the Minor Planets, Schmadel also researched the unclear origin of numerous asteroids, most of which had been named prior to World War II. This article incorporates text from this source, which is in the public domain: SBDB New namings may only be added to this list below after official publication as the preannouncement of names is condemned. The WGSBN publishes a comprehensive guideline for the naming rules of non-cometary small Solar System bodies.

Named minor planet	Provisional	This minor planet was named for...	Ref · Catalog
463368 Eurytus	2012 VU_{85}	Eurytus was a centaur in Greek mythology, known for taking part in the famous battle between the centaurs and the Lapiths.	IAU · 463368
