= Apheidas =

Set of mythological Greek characters

In Greek mythology, the name Apheidas (/əˈfaɪdəs/; Ancient Greek: Ἀφείδας or Ἀφείδαντα) may refer to:

- Apheidas, son of Arcas
- Apheidas, a Centaur who attended the wedding of Pirithous and Hippodamia.
- Apheidas, son of Polypemon, from Alybas. Odysseus at first introduces himself as Eperitus, son of this Apheidas, when he comes to see Laertes after having done away with the suitors of Penelope.
- Apheidas, one of the comrades of the Greek hero Odysseus. When the latter and 12 of his crew came into the port of Sicily, the Cyclops Polyphemus seized and confined them. The monster then slain Apheidas and five others namely: Antiphon, Euryleon, Kepheus, Stratios and Menetos, while the remaining six survived.
- Apheidas (king of Athens), son of Oxyntes. After a short reign of one year, his brother Thymoetes succeeded him on the throne.
- Apheidas, a king after whom a part of Molossians were named Apheidantes.

== Notes ==
Regnal titles
Preceded by Oxyntes	King of Athens	Succeeded by Thymoetes
