= Euryleon (mythology) =

Companion of Odysseus eaten by the Cyclops

In Greek mythology, Euryleon (Ancient Greek: Εύρυλέοντα) was one of the comrades of the Greek hero Odysseus.

== Mythology ==
When Odysseus and 12 of his crew came into the port of Sicily, the Cyclops Polyphemus seized and confined them. The monster then slain Euryleon and five others namely: Antiphon, Apheidas, Kepheus, Stratios and Menetos, while the remaining six survived.
