= Cepheus (mythology) =

Greek mythological characters

In Greek mythology, Cepheus (/ˈsiːfiəs, -fjuːs/; Ancient Greek: Κηφεύς Kepheús) may refer to the following personages:

- Cepheus, king of Ethiopia and father of Andromeda.
- Cepheus, king of Tegea in Arcadia and one of the Argonauts.
- Cepheus, one of the comrades of the Greek hero Odysseus. When the latter and 12 of his crew came into the port of Sicily, the Cyclops Polyphemus seized and confined them. The monster then killed Cepheus and five others namely: Antiphon, Euryleon, Apheidas, Stratios and Menetos, while the remaining six survived.
