= Antiphon (mythology) =

Companion of Odysseus

In Greek mythology, Antiphon (/ˈæntɪfɒn, -ən/; Ancient Greek: Άντιφόν) was one of the comrades of the Greek hero Odysseus.

== Mythology ==
When Odysseus and 12 of his crew came into the port of Sicily, the Cyclops Polyphemus seized and confined them. The monster then slew Antiphon and five others, namely: Euryleon, Apheidas, Kepheus, Stratios and Menetos, while the remaining six survived.
