= Stratius =

Greek mythological figures

In Greek mythology, Stratius or Stratios (/ˈsteɪʃiəs/; Ancient Greek: Στάτιος or Στράτιόν means 'of an army') may refer to three distinct figures:

- Stratius, an Orchomenian prince as the son of King Clymenus of the Minyans and possibly, Boudeia or Bouzyge, daughter of Lycus. He was the brother of Erginus, Arrhon, Pyleus, Azeus, Eurydice and Axia.
- Stratius, also known as Stratichus, son of King Nestor of Pylos.
- Stratius, one of the comrades of the Greek hero Odysseus. When the latter and 12 of his crew came into the port of Sicily, the Cyclops Polyphemus seized and confined them. The monster then slain Stratius and five others namely: Antiphon, Euryleon, Apheidas, Kepheus, and Menetos, while the remaining six survived.
- Stratius, one of the Suitors of Penelope who came from Zacynthus along with other 43 wooers. He, with the other suitors, was slain by Odysseus with the help of Eumaeus, Philoetius, and Telemachus.
