= Menetus (mythology) =

Greek mythological figures

In Greek mythology, Menetus or Menetos (Ancient Greek: Μένετον, lit. 'steadfast', 'patient', or 'long-suffering') may refer to the following personages:

- Menetus or Menetes father of Antianira (also called Laothoe) who became the mother of the Argonauts Echion and Eurytus.
- Menetos, one of the comrades of the Greek hero Odysseus. When the latter and 12 of his crew came into the port of Sicily, the Cyclops Polyphemus seized and confined them. The monster then slew Menetus and five others namely: Antiphon, Euryleon, Apheidas, Cepheus and Stratios, while the remaining six survived.

The name Menetus was derived from the verb meno (μένω), meaning to stay, abide, or wait.
