= Antianeira (daughter of Menetes) =

Greek mythical character, daughter of Menetus

In Greek mythology, Antianeira (Ancient Greek: Ἀντιανείρης), also called Laothoe, was a daughter of Menetes (Menetus)and mother of the Argonauts Eurytus and Echion, whom she bore to Hermes.
