= Laothoe =

Term in Greek mythology

In Greek mythology, Laothoe (Ancient Greek: Λαοθόη) can refer to the following women:

- Laothoe, consort of King Porthaon of Calydon and mother of Sterope, Stratonice and Eurythemiste.
- Laothoe or Antianeira, daughter of Menetus (Meretus), mother of the Argonauts Erytus (Eurytus) and Echion by Hermes.
- Laothoe, a Thespian princess as one of the 50 daughters of King Thespius and Megamede or by one of his many wives. When Heracles hunted and ultimately slayed the Cithaeronian lion, Laothoe with her other sisters, except for one, all laid with the hero in a night, a week or for 50 days as what their father strongly desired it to be. Laothoe bore Heracles a son, Antiphus.
- Laothoe, mother of Thestor by Idmon.
- Laothoe, a consort of Priam, king of Troy, and mother of Lycaon and sometimes Polydorus. Her father was Altes, king of the Leleges.
- Laothoe, wife of the Trojan elder Clytius.
