= Eurytus =

Set of mythological Greek characters

Eurytus, Eurytos (/ˈjʊərɪtəs/; Ancient Greek: Εὔρυτος) or Erytus (Ἔρυτος) is the name of several characters in Greek mythology, and of at least one historical figure.

== Mythological ==
- Eurytus, one of the Giants, sons of Gaia, killed by Dionysus during the Gigantomachy, the battle of the Giants versus the Olympian gods.
- Eurytus, a chieftain at the court of king Cepheus, and was killed by Perseus during the battle between the latter and Phineus.
- Eurytus, king of Caria and the father of Eidothea, who was one of the possible spouses of Miletus.
- Eurytus, a centaur present at the wedding of Pirithous and Hippodamia, and the one that caused the conflict between the Lapiths and the Centaurs by trying to carry the bride off. The most violent of the centaurs involved in the battle with the Lapiths, he was killed by Theseus.
- Eurytus, king of Oechalia, Thessaly, and father of Iole and Iphitus.
- Eurytus, father of Cleobule, mother by Tenthredon of Prothous, leader of the Magnesians during the Trojan War.
- Eurytus, son of Hippocoön was killed, along with his brothers, by Heracles.
- Eurytus or Erytus of Alope, son of Hermes and Antianeira (daughter of Menetus) or Laothoe, and brother of Echion. Together with the latter and stepbrother, Aethalides, they participated in the quest of the Argonauts. Erytus and his brother were described as “well skilled in craftiness” which signified the ability they possess as children of the thief-god. He was also counted as one of the hunters of the Calydonian Boar.
- Eurytus, son of Molione, by either Poseidon or Actor.
- Eurytus, an Elean prince as one of the children of King Augeas, who was killed by Heracles near Cleonae.
- Eurytus, the Greek leader of the Epeans (from Elis) and Taphians during the Trojan War, and an ally of Elephenor. He was killed by Telephus's son Eurypylus.
- Eurytus, father of Clonus. His son was known for having made the belt of Pallas.
- Eurytus, an alternate name for Eurypylus of Cyrene.

== Historical ==
- Eurytus of Sparta, a Spartan warrior, one of the Three Hundred sent to face the Persians at the Battle of Thermopylae in 480 BC.
- Eurytus (Pythagorean), a Pythagorean philosopher (fl. 400 BC).
