= Melaneus (mythology) =

Recurring name in Greek mythology

In Greek mythology, Melaneus (/ˈmɛlənˌjuːs/; Ancient Greek: Μελανεύς, romanized: Melaneús) may refer to the following personages:

- Melaneus, son of Apollo and husband of Oechalia.
- Melaneus, counted among the Ethiopian chiefs and was in the court of Cepheus at the time of the fight between Perseus and Phineus, and was killed during the same fight.
- Melaneus, an Indian, whose shape Hera took to warn Astraeis, and Indian captain during Dionysus' Indian War.
- Melaneus, joined, along with his father and brothers, Deriades against Dionysus in the Indian War. He was son of Aretus and Laobie and thus brother of Lycus, Myrsus, Glaucus and Periphas.
- Melaneus, a centaur mentioned by Ovid among many others who fought in the battle between the Lapiths and the centaurs.
- Melaneus, father of Autonous, the father of Anthus, Erodius, Schoenous, Acanthus and Acanthis by Hippodamia.
- Melaneus, a Trojan warrior and brother of Alcidamas. He was killed by Neoptolemus, Achilles' son, during the Trojan War.
- Melaneus, father of Amphimedon, one of the suitors of Penelope.
- Melaneus, one of Actaeon's dogs.
