= Harpe of Babylon =

Greek mythological figure

Harpe

In-universe information
- Gender: Female
- Title: Noblewoman
- Significant other: Clinis
- Children: Ortygius, Lycius, Harpasus, Artemiche
- Birthplace: Babylon

In Greek mythology, Harpe (Ancient Greek: Ἄρπη, romanized: Harpe, lit. 'snatcher') is a minor figure and the wife of a rich Babylonian man named Clinis, and the mother by him of Lycius, Ortygius, Harpasus and Artemiche. Her family venerated Apollo greatly, until they angered him gravely, thereupon he punished them all, but Poseidon spared Harpe by turning her into a bird.

== Mythology ==
One day her husband Clinis, having witnessed the Hyperboreans sacrifice donkeys to Apollo, meant to do the same. But Apollo forbid so, under the pain of death. Two of Harpe's children, Ortygius and his sister Artemiche persuaded their father to obey the god, while the other two Harparus and Lycius wanted to sacrifice the donkeys. Clinis ended up listening to Ortygius and Artemiche, but Harpasus with Lycius decided to proceed with the sacrifice anyway. Apollo turned the donkeys mad as punishment, who began to devour the family. They all cried for help. Poseidon felt sorry for Harpe and her son Harpasus, and transformed them both into birds. It is not clear what bird Harpe turned into, but given her name, it can be safely assumed it was a bird of prey.

== See also ==
- Aëtos
- Erodius
- Autonous

== Bibliography ==
- Antoninus Liberalis, The Metamorphoses of Antoninus Liberalis translated by Francis Celoria (Routledge 1992). Online version at the Topos Text Project.
- Celoria, Francis (1992). The Metamorphoses of Antoninus Liberalis: A Translation with a Commentary. Routledge. ISBN 0-415-06896-7.
