= Erodius (disambiguation) =

Erodius (Ancient Greek: Ἐροδιός, romanized: Erodios, lit. 'heron') is a figure in Greek mythology, the son of Autonous (son of Melaneus) and Hippodamia.

The following biological taxa are named after this character:

- Erodius (genus), a genus of beetles in the tribe Erodiini of family Tenebrionidae (darkling beetles)
- Erodius (subgenus), a subgenus within the above genus
