= Philaeus (mythology) =

Greek mythological figure

Megaletor

In-universe information
- Gender: Male
- Title: Prince
- Relatives: Munichus (father); Lelante (mother); Alcander, Megaletor (brothers); Hyperippe (sister)
- Birthplace: Molossia

In Greek mythology, Philaeus (Ancient Greek: Φιλαῖος, romanized: Philaîos) is a minor figure, a prince of the Molossians, who was transformed into a bird by the will of Zeus, the god of justice, in order to escape a fiery death.

== Family ==
Philaeus was one of the sons of the Molossian king Munichus by his wife Lelante. He had two brothers, Alcander and Megaletor, and a sister named Hyperippe.

== Mythology ==
The entire family was seen as just and righteous and therefore especially favored by the gods. One day raiders attacked them in the fields; the family ran off to their house and began to throw various objects at them in self-defense, whereupon the offenders set the house ablaze. The god of justice, Zeus would not let his favourites suffer such a cruel and undeserving death that he changed them all six of them into various birds in order to save them from the flames; Philaeus became a 'dog bird', an entirely unidentifiable avian creature.

== See also ==
- Artemiche
- Erodius
- Hippodamia

== Bibliography ==
- Antoninus Liberalis, The Metamorphoses of Antoninus Liberalis translated by Francis Celoria (Routledge 1992). Online version at the Topos Text Project.
- Celoria, Francis (1992). The Metamorphoses of Antoninus Liberalis: A Translation with a Commentary. Routledge. ISBN 0-415-06896-7.
- Ovid, Metamorphoses, Volume II: Books 9-15. Translated by Frank Justus Miller. Revised by G. P. Goold. Loeb Classical Library 43. Cambridge, MA: Harvard University Press, 1916.
