= Acanthus =

Acanthus (pl.: acanthus, rarely acanthuses in English, or acanthi in Latin), its feminine form acantha (plural: acanthae), the Latinised form of the ancient Greek word acanthos or akanthos, or the prefix acantho-, may refer to:

== Biology ==
- Acanthus (plant), a genus containing plants used for ornament and in traditional medicine
  - Acanthus (ornament), ornamental forms in architecture using the leaf shape
- Acanthus, an entomological term for a thornlike projection on an insect, typically a single-celled cuticular growth without tormogen (socket) or sensory cells

== Mythology ==
- Acantha, a supposed figure in Greek mythology associated with the Acanthus plant
- Acanthus, son of Autonous who received his name after the plant, which was common in his infertile homeland

== People ==
- Acanthus of Sparta, an ancient athlete
- Acanthus, the pen-name of the cartoonist Frank Hoar

== Places ==
- Acanthus, Ontario, a modern Canadian town
- Acanthus (Caria), a town of ancient Caria, near Bybassus
- Acanthus (Egypt), an ancient Egyptian city
- Akanthos (Greece), an ancient Greek city in Greek Macedonia
- Acantha, County Offaly, a townland in the civil parish of Durrow, barony of Ballycowan, Ireland

== Other uses ==
- Acanthus path, a fictional tradition of enchanters, magicians and witches in the game Mage: The Awakening

== See also ==
- List of commonly used taxonomic affixes
