= Acanthis =

Acanthis (not to be confused with Acanthus) may refer to:

- Acanthis (bird), a genus of birds known as the redpolls
- Acanthis (mythology), figure in Greek mythology
