= Harpasus =

Greek mythological figure

In-universe information
- Gender: Male
- Title: Nobleman
- Relatives: Clinis (father); Harpe (mother); Ortygius, Lycius (brothers); Artemiche (sister)
- Birthplace: Babylon

In Greek mythology, Harpasus (Ancient Greek: Ἄρπασος, romanized: Harpasos, lit. 'snatcher') is the son of Clinis by his wife Harpe, the brother of Lycius, Ortygius and Artemiche. His family venerated Apollo greatly, until they angered him gravely.

== Mythology ==
One day his father Clinis, having witnessed the Hyperboreans sacrifice donkeys to Apollo, meant to do the same. But Apollo forbid so, under the pain of death. Harpasus's siblings Ortygius and his sister Artemiche persuaded their father to obey the god, while Harparus himself and his other brother Lycius wanted to sacrifice the donkeys. Clinis ended up listening to Ortygius and Artemiche, but Harpasus with Lycius decided to proceed with the sacrifice anyway. Apollo turned the donkeys mad as punishment, who began to devour the family. They all cried for help. Poseidon felt sorry for Harpasus and his mother Harpe, and transformed them both into birds. It is not clear what bird Harpasus turned into, but given his name, it can be safely assumed it was a bird of prey.

== See also ==
- Aëtos
- Erodius
- Autonous

== Bibliography ==
- Antoninus Liberalis, The Metamorphoses of Antoninus Liberalis translated by Francis Celoria (Routledge 1992). Online version at the Topos Text Project.
- Celoria, Francis (1992). The Metamorphoses of Antoninus Liberalis: A Translation with a Commentary. Routledge. ISBN 0-415-06896-7.
