= Rhodanthe (mythology) =

Supposed character in Greek mythology

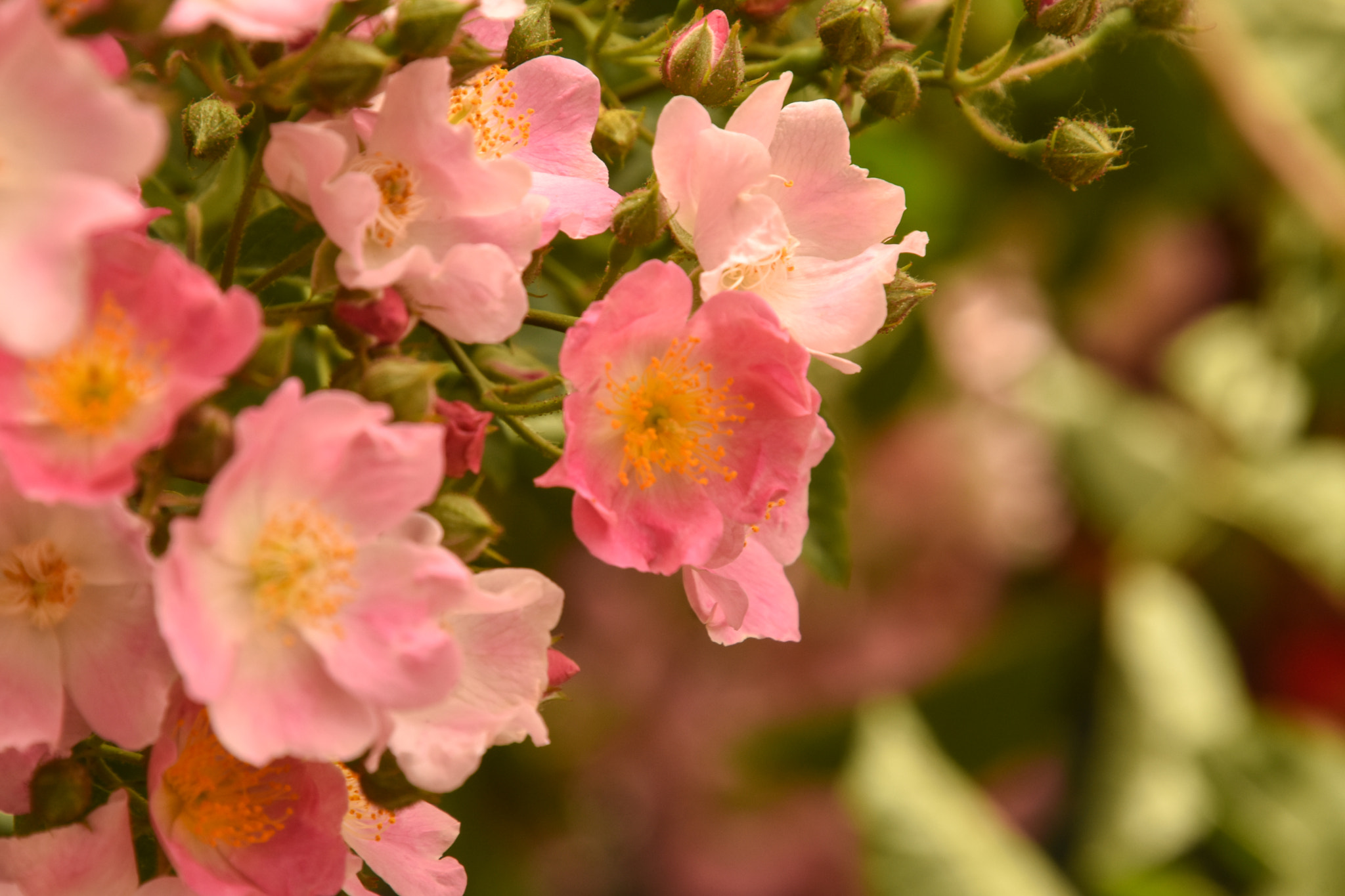
Pink roses in Athens, Greece.

Rhodanthe (/roʊˈdænθi/ roh-DAN-thee, Ancient Greek: Ῥοδάνθη, romanized: Rhodánthē, lit. 'rose flower') is the name of a supposed Corinthian queen in Greek mythology who attracted a great number of suitors due to her beauty. Her story however is not attested in any ancient Greek or Roman source, and is instead a case of pseudo-mythology.

== Etymology ==
Rhodanthe's name means "rose flower", a composite word made up by the Greek words ῥόδον meaning "rose", and ἄνθος meaning "flower, blossom". Rhodon is the origin the English word rose, and seems to have been borrowed into the Greek language from the East. The Latin borrowing 'rhodantha' suggests "she who is rose-coloured" or "who has red flowers."

== The tale ==
The myth goes that the queen of Corinth Rhodanthe was so beautiful no man who met her could resist to fall in love with her. Wishing to escape her countless and ardent suitors, she fled to a temple of Artemis/Diana where she took refuge. Three of the bolder suitors followed her there, and being smitten by her beauty, declared her to be the new goddess of the temple, and renounced Artemis. They were about to overturn the cult image of Artemis when the god Apollo intervened, and angered about the offence directed at his twin sister, metamorphosed all four involved. The three princes became a worm, a fly and a butterfly. Rhodanthe herself was transformed into a rosebush, owing to her name.

== Background ==
Over the years, this unsupported tale has been included in various mythology books and websites and passed as genuine ancient Greek lore, however none have also included a citation to an original source dating back to ancient Greece or Rome.

The myth is not found in any modern scholarly works noted for their completeness regarding ancient Greek mythology and folklore, such as the German encyclopedia Der Neue Pauly, which is considered to be an unparalleled masterpiece of classical German scholarship, the Dictionary of Greek and Roman Biography and Mythology by William Smith, which has been praised for its thorough and accurate entries that draw directly from ancient literary sources, or in Paul M. C. Forbes Irving's Metamorphosis in Greek Myths, a work specifically dealing with the themes of transformation in Greek mythology. Rhodanthe's story is similarly absent in the Lexicon Iconographicum Mythologiae Classicae, a work that has been praised for its breadth and quality,

The actual origin of the tale is French; the story was coined by Father René Rapin, a Jesuit and writer who lived in the seventeenth century. The tale has been described as "pleasing" and "ingenious," but is nonetheless not sourced in actual ancient Greek or Roman beliefs.

Nevertheless, the rose is featured in some genuine ancient Greek traditions. The rose was seen as the sacred flower of the goddess of love and desire, Aphrodite. Following the gruesome death of her beloved Adonis, it is said that she accidentally pricked herself on a white rose, which was then stained red by her blood. Alternatively, it was Adonis's red blood that became the rose, or Aphrodite's hot tears. Rhodanthe appears as a female given name in the romance novel Rhodanthe and Dosicles (Τὰ κατὰ Ῥοδάνθην καὶ Δοσικλέα), by the Byzantine author Theodore Prodromos (c. 1100 – c. 1165/70).

== See also ==
- Acantha
- Amethyste
- Orchis
- Rainbow crow

== Bibliography ==
- Beekes, Robert S. P. (2010). Lucien van Beek (ed.). Etymological Dictionary of Greek. Leiden Indo-European Etymological Dictionary Series. Vol. ΙΙ. Leiden, the Netherlands: Brill Publications. ISBN 978-90-04-17419-1.
- Cyrino, Monica S. (2010). Aphrodite. Gods and Heroes of the Ancient World. New York and London: Routledge publications. ISBN 978-0-415-77523-6.
- Folkard, Richard (1884). Plant Lore, Legends, and Lyrics: Embracing the Myths, Traditions, Superstitions, and Folk-lore of the Plant Kingdom. Michigan: S. Low, Marston, Searle, and Rivington.
- Forbes Irving, Paul M. C. (1990). Metamorphosis in Greek Myths. Clarendon Press. ISBN 0-19-814730-9.
- Liddell, Henry George; Scott, Robert (1940). A Greek-English Lexicon, revised and augmented throughout by Sir Henry Stuart Jones with the assistance of Roderick McKenzie. Oxford: Clarendon Press. Online version at Perseus.tufts project.
- Paul, William (1863). The Rose Garden (2nd ed.). London: Kent and Co.
- Sharr, Francis Aubie (2019). Western Australian Plant Names and their Meanings. Kardinya, Western Australia: Four Gables Press. ISBN 9780958034180.
- Stratikis, Potis (December 2008). Οι Μύθοι των Λουλουδιών [The Flower Myths] (in Greek). Athens, Greece: Stratikis publications. ISBN 9789607261533.
- Wagner, Wilhelm (1970). Medieval Greek Texts: Being a Collection of the Earliest Compositions in Vulgar Greek, Prior to the Year 1500. John Benjamins Publishing. ISBN 90-6032-432-3.
- Watts, Donald C. (May 2, 2007). Dictionary of Plant Lore. Bath, United Kingdom: Elsevier. ISBN 978-0-12-374086-1.
