= Hyperippe =

Multiple figures in Greek mythology

In Greek mythology, the name Hyperippe (/hɪpəˈrɪpi/; Ancient Greek: Ὑπερίππη) may refer to:

- Hyperippe, daughter of Danaus and Crino, who married and killed Hippocorystes, son of Aegyptus and Hephaestine.
- Hyperippe, daughter of Arcas and one of the possible wives of Endymion.
- Hyperippe, daughter of Leucon, son of Athamas and Themisto.
- Hyperippe, daughter of Munichus and Lelante, sister of Alcander, Philaeus and Megaletor. The family were just and righteous, and were favored by the gods. When one night robbers set their house afire, Zeus would not let them die such a miserable death and transformed them into different birds. Hyperippe was changed into a diver, because she jumped into water to escape fire.
