= Ortygius =

Greek mythological figure

In-universe information
- Gender: Male
- Title: Nobleman
- Relatives: Clinis (father); Harpe (mother); Harpasus, Lycius (brothers); Artemiche (sister)
- Birthplace: Babylon

In Greek mythology, Ortygius (Ancient Greek: Ὀρτύγιος, romanized: Ortugios, lit. 'quail') is the son of Clinis by his wife Harpe, the brother of Lycius, Harpasus and Artemiche. He was transformed into a bird by Apollo, whom his family venerated greatly.

== Mythology ==
One day his father Clinis, having witnessed the Hyperboreans sacrifice donkeys to Apollo, meant to do the same. But Apollo forbid so, under the pain of death. Ortygius and his sister Artemiche persuaded their father to obey the god, while Harparus and Lycius wanted to sacrifice the donkeys. Ortygius himself suggested they sacrificed goats instead. Clinis ended up listening to Ortygius and Artemiche, but their two brothers decided to proceed with the sacrifice anyway. Apollo turned the donkeys mad as punishment, who began to devour the family. They all cried for help. Leto and Artemis decided to save Clinis, Ortygius and Artemiche, as they had done nothing wrong. Apollo allowed them to save them by changing them into birds. Ortygius was turned into a billy-tit.

== See also ==
- Ortygia
- Erodius
- Autonous

== Bibliography ==
- Antoninus Liberalis, The Metamorphoses of Antoninus Liberalis translated by Francis Celoria (Routledge 1992). Online version at the Topos Text Project.
- Celoria, Francis (1992). The Metamorphoses of Antoninus Liberalis: A Translation with a Commentary. Routledge. ISBN 0-415-06896-7.
