= Amethyste =

Pseudo-mythological figure

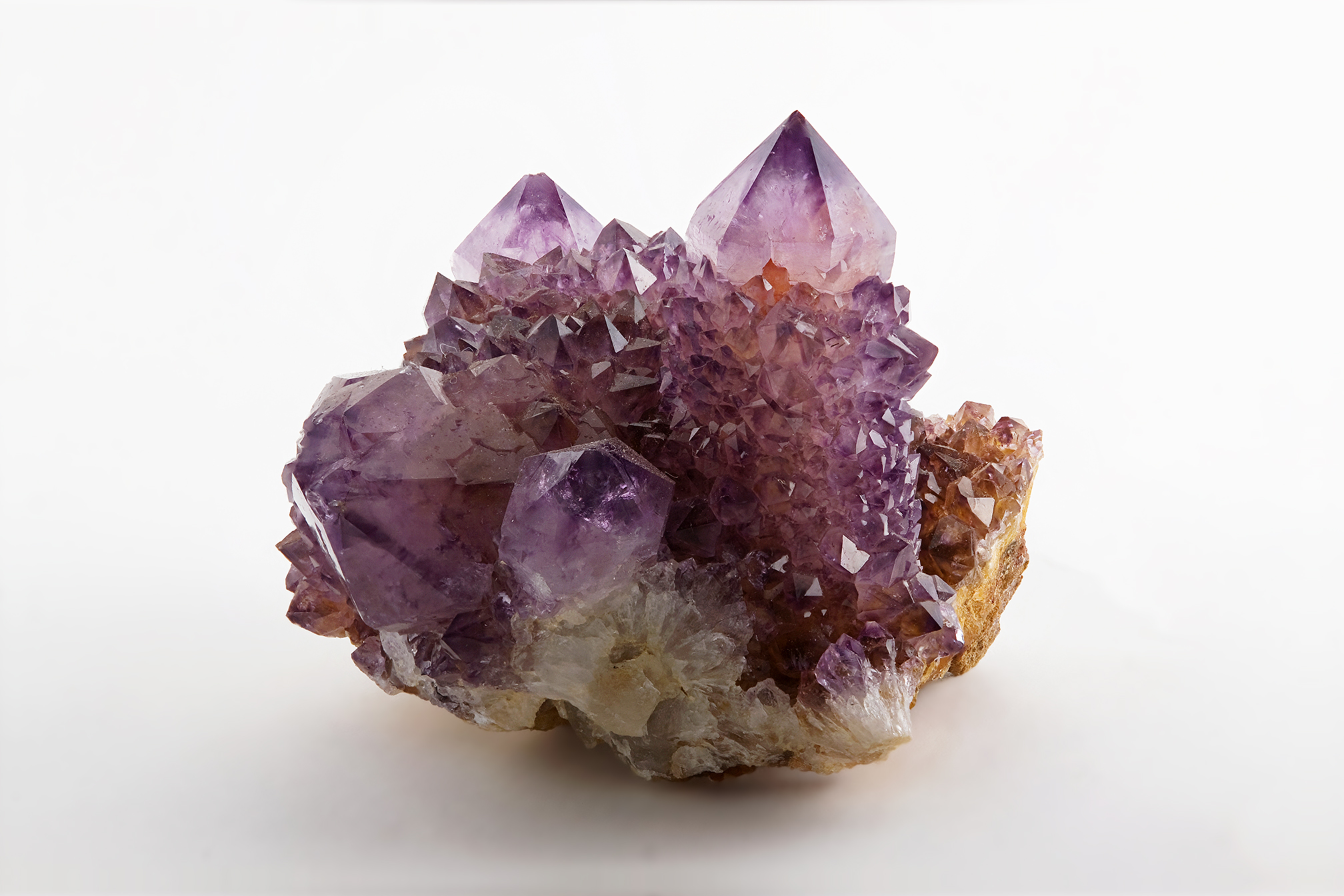
An amethyst stone from South Africa.

Amethyste or Amethystos (Ancient Greek: Ἀμέθυστη, romanized: Améthustē, lit. 'non-drunk') is supposedly a nymph in Greek mythology who was turned into a precious stone by the goddess Diana/Artemis in order to avoid a worse fate at the hands of the god Dionysus, thus explaining the origin of the semi-precious stone amethyst. Although this tale has circulated in various sites and books, no ancient source attests to it, and its origin is much later than either ancient Greece or Rome.

== The claim ==
The supposed story usually goes that the god of wine and viticulture Bacchus fell in love with a beautiful nymph named Amethyste or Amethystos, but she spurned his affections. He then chased her down, and she ran, praying to the gods to protect her virginity. Diana/Artemis then, the goddess of chastity, pitied the girl and transformed her into a pure white stone. Bacchus relented, and seeing the stone, regretted his behaviour. So he poured some wine on the white stone, which stained it purple for all time.

An alternative story states that Bacchus, offended at the neglect he was receiving from the mortals, declared that the first person he would meet would be devoured by his tigers. Fate had it that the first person he chanced upon was Amethyste, a beautiful maiden on her way to pay her respects at the shrine of Diana. Seeing the beasts, she prayed for protection from her patron, and Diana turned her into a white stone. Like in the first version, Bacchus regretted his actions and poured wine, turning the white stone deep purple.

== Origin of the tale ==
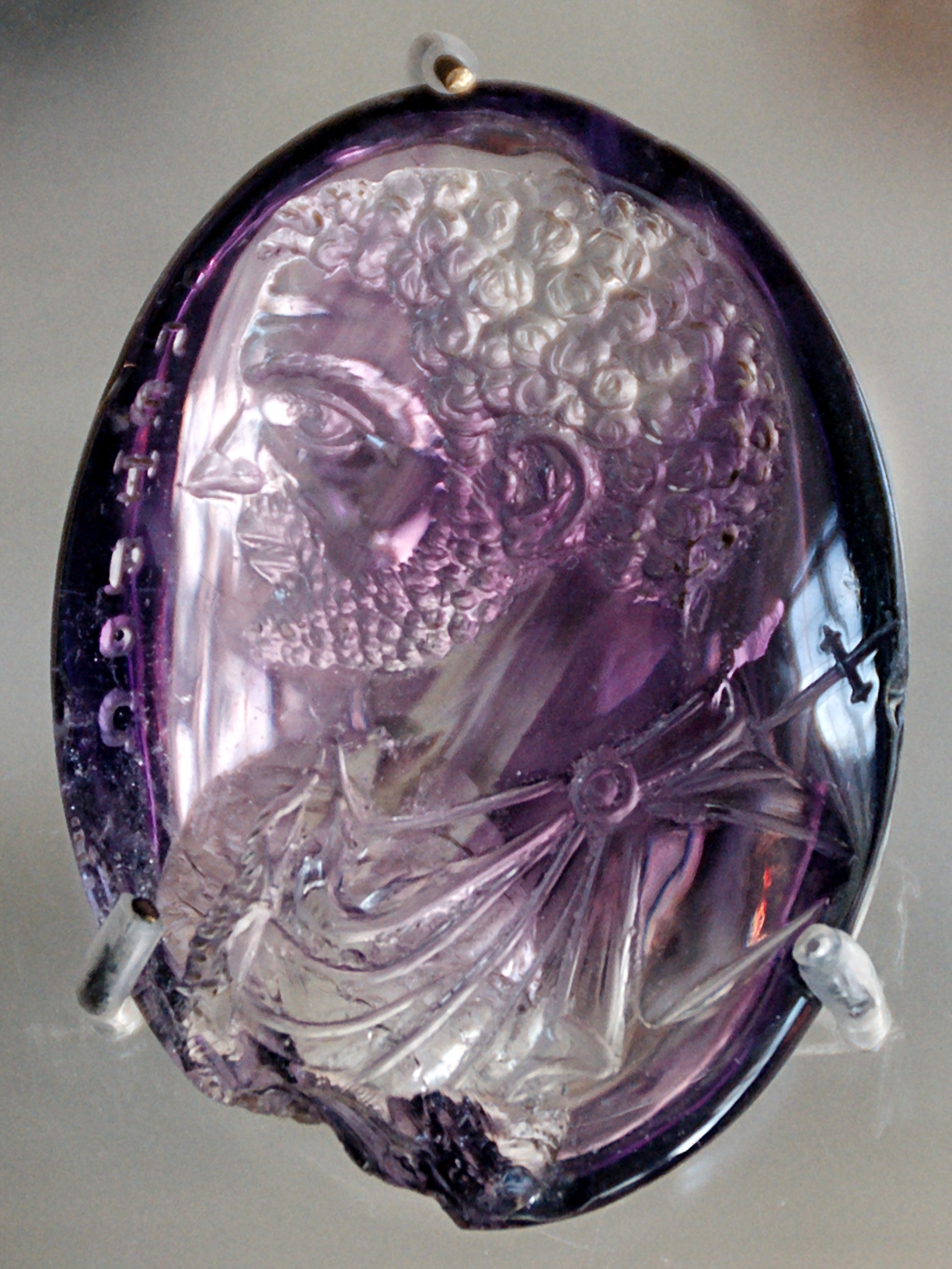
Roman intaglio engraved gem of Caracalla in amethyst, once in the Treasury of Sainte-Chapelle.

The myth of Amethyste has no basis in the actual texts written by ancient Greek and Roman authors. Instead it was French poet Rémy Belleau (1528–1577) who invented a myth in which Bacchus fell in love and chased Amethyste in his poem L'Amethyste, ou les Amours de Bacchus et d'Amethyste ("The Amethyst, or the loves of Bacchus and Amethyst"). The version with the tigers is likewise French in origin.

Although no nymph that turns into the precious stone features in any myth, the late antiquity author Nonnus states that Dionysus was gifted an amethyst stone from his grandmother Rhea which can be used to preserve the wine-drinker's sanity. Similarly, the tale actually draws from real, common themes of Greek myths, in particular the concept of a maiden attracting the unwanted attention of a god, fleeing from him, and being transformed into something else at the hands of a merciful deity, as seen in the tales of Daphne, Arethusa, Corone, Taygete, the Pleiades, and numerous others.

In antiquity, amethyst was considered to be a magical charm or antidote that protected the drinker against drunkenness, which is also why goblets for wine-drinking would often be carved from it. This belief is evident from the word's etymology, as it derives from ἀ-, expressing negation, and μεθύω, "to get drunk", meaning thus "non-drunk" or "non-intoxicating."

== See also ==
Other fakelore and misconceptions include:

- Acantha
- Clytie
- Orchis
- Rainbow crow
- Rhodanthe
- Mesperyian

== Bibliography ==
- Burges, George (1881). The Greek Anthology, as Selected for the Use of Westminster, Eton, and Other Public Schools. George Bell and Sons.
- Federman, David (2012). Modern Jeweler's Consumer Guide to Colored Gemstones. Springer Science & Business Media. ISBN 978-1-4684-6488-7.
- Kunz, George Frederick (1913). The Curious Lore of Precious Stones. New York, US: Dover Publications, Inc. ISBN 0-486-22227-6.
- Liddell, Henry George; Scott, Robert (1940). A Greek-English Lexicon, revised and augmented throughout by Sir Henry Stuart Jones with the assistance of Roderick McKenzie. Oxford: Clarendon Press. Online version at Perseus.tufts project.
- Nonnus, Dionysiaca; translated by Rouse, W H D, I Books I-XV. Loeb Classical Library No. 344, Cambridge, Massachusetts, Harvard University Press; London, William Heinemann Ltd. 1940. Internet Archive
