= Harpe (mythology) =

In Greek mythology, Harpe (Ancient Greek: Ἄρπη, lit. 'sickle', 'scythe', 'curved blade' or 'a bird of prey') was the name of the following characters:

- Harpe, wife of Clinis and mother of Lycius, Ortygius, Harpasus, and Artemiche.
- Harpe, one of the nurses of Dionysus and a maenad who followed him in his Indian campaign.
- Harpe, an Amazon fighting in Aeetes' army against the troops of Perses.
