= Earliest Greek democracies =

This is a list of the Greek democracies for which there is some evidence in the Archaic period, following Eric Robinson's book The First Democracies (Stuttgart, 1997). Most of them probably pre-date the establishment of democracy in Athens by Cleisthenes in 508-507 BC.

Polis/ area	Date
Achaea	At some point between c. 650 and c. 500 BC
Chios	Probably a democracy sometime between c. 600-550 BC
Megara	Probably a democracy sometime in the 6th century BC
Chalkis	Possibly a short-lived democracy sometime in the 6th century BC
Mantinea	Possibly a democracy sometime in the 6th century BC
Cnidus	A democracy either in the 6th century or the 4th century BC
Heraclea Pontica	A democracy by c. 560 BC
Cyrene	A democracy from c. 550 BC
Naxos	A democracy from c. 550 to 490 BC
Ambracia	Probably a democracy by c. 550 BC
Argos	A democracy possibly from c. 550, and definitely from 494 BC
Elis	Possibly a democracy in the 6th century, and definitely in the 5th century BC
Samos	Possibly a democracy in the late 6th century BC
Kos	A democracy from the 490s BC
Akragas	Possibly a democracy before 488, and definitely one after 472 BC
