= Idomene =

Idomene may refer to:

- Idomeni, a town in Greece near the border with the Republic of North Macedonia
- Idomenae, a town of ancient Macedonia, now in the Republic of North Macedonia
- Idomene, wife of Amythaon
- Idomene (Ambracia), a location or mountains near Amphilochian Argos

- Battle of Idomene, fought there
