= Cragaleus =

Son of Dryops in Greek mythology

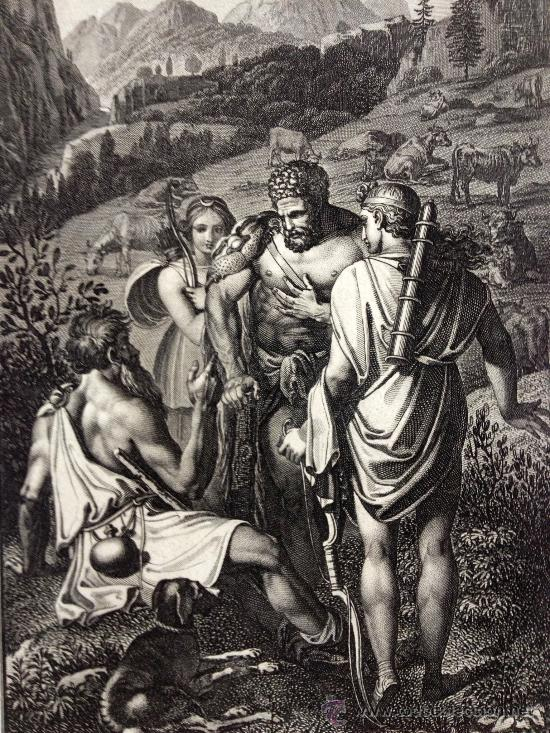
Cragaleus

In Greek mythology, Cragaleus (/krəˈɡaɪliːəs/; Ancient Greek: Κραγαλεύς) was a son of Dryops who dwelt in the land Dryopis next to a spring which was believed to have appeared at a place where Heracles hit the earth with his club (near Thermopylae).

== Mythology ==
Cragaleus was renowned as just and wise and was one day visited by Apollo, Artemis, and Heracles, who asked him to act as an arbiter in their argument as to which of the three should become patron of Ambracia, Epirus. Apollo argued that the city should belong to him because Epirus was once conquered by his son Melaneus, and that he assisted the Ambraciotes in the war against the natives of Epirus and brought law and order to Ambracia. Artemis reminded that it was she who saved the Ambraciotes from the tyrant Phalecus, having sent a lioness to kill him. Finally, Heracles brought up that it was he who destroyed the many non-Greek peoples of Epirus for trying to steal the kine of Geryon from him, and that the Corinthians, who later came to Epirus and founded Ambracia, were his descendants. Cragaleus considered Heracles' argument the most convincing and declared him the winner. Apollo was enraged and turned Cragaleus into stone. Since then, the Ambraciotes sacrificed to Apollo the Saviour, but believed their city to belong to Heracles and the Heracleidae, and honored Cragaleus with sacrifices as well.
