= Rainbow crow =

Legend of unknown origin

The story of the Rainbow Crow is a supposed Lenape legend, symbolizing the value of selflessness and service. However, the Lenape origins of this myth are denied by the Lenape-Nanticoke Museum, which attributes the myth to a recent modification of a Cherokee story known as the "First Fire". And in fact, the museum states that the crow has no significant role in traditional Lenape culture. No source for a Lenape version of this story is known to exist prior to a 1989 book of the same name supposedly "retold" by Penguin Random House author Nancy Van Laan. Van Laan ultimately attributes this story to a Chief Bill "Whippoorwill" Thompson.

== Plot ==
After a long period of cold weather, the animals of the community become worried. They decide to send a messenger to the Great Sky Spirit to ask for relief. The Rainbow Crow, the most beautifully feathered bird, offers to make the arduous journey. He travels safely, and is rewarded by the Great Spirit with the gift of fire. He carries the gift in his beak back to his people, but upon his return, he does not appear to be the same bird that he once was. The fire has scorched his plumage black, with only hints of his previous color, and his voice has been made rough and hoarse by the smoke. In this way, his sacrifice is commemorated.

Another name for Rainbow Crow is Many Colored Crow. This is in reference to the iridescent feathers created from the fire that scorched his plumage black, with only hints of his previous color that reflect when sun light strikes them.

== Adaptations ==
This legend is the basis of multiple American animated short films, including one by online media platform HitRecord and another by Baobab Studios titled Crow: The Legend, with singer John Legend voicing the titular crow.

== See also ==
- Amethyste
- Orchis
- Rhodanthe
