= Silanus of Ambracia =

Silanus (Greek: Σιλανός) of Ambracia was an ancient Greek soothsayer in Xenophon's Anabasis. In 401 BC, he accompanied Cyrus the Younger in an expedition against Artaxerxes. When Silanus provided Cyrus with a successful prediction, he was rewarded with 3000 darics (or 10 talents).
