= Stratonice (wife of Melaneus) =

Ancient Greek princess and princess of Calydon

In Greek mythology, Stratonice (Ancient Greek: Στρατoνίκη from στρατός "army" and νίκη "victory") was a Calydonian princess as the daughter of King Porthaon and Laothoe. She was the sister of Eurythemiste and Sterope.

== Mythology ==
When Stratonice and her sisters grew up, they left their parents to live in the mountains. According to Hesiod, they were "like goddesses, skilled in very beautiful works" and the companions of "the beautiful haired nymphs and of the Muses on the wooded mountains".

When Apollo intended to make Stratonice the bride of his son Melaneus, the princess accompanied the god to marry his son. Since Stratonice was her own kuria (authority), Apollo carried her away without giving her father any bridal gifts (hedna) and brought her to Oechalia. After marrying Melaneus she became the queen of Oechalia and gave birth to their dear son, the famous archer Eurytus.
