= Munichus =

Set of Greek mythical characters

In Greek mythology, Munichus (/ˈmjuːnɪkəs/; Ancient Greek: Μούνιχος, romanized: Moúnikhos) may refer to:

- Munichus, son of Dryas, king of the Molossians and a seer. He was husband of Lelante and by her father of three sons, Philaeus, Alcander and Megaletor, and of a daughter Hyperippe. Of them Alcander excelled his father in prophetic abilities. The family were just and righteous and therefore especially favored by the gods. One day, raiders attacked them in the fields; the family ran off to their house and began to throw various objects at them in self-defense, whereupon the offenders set fire to the house. Zeus would not let his favorites die such a miserable death and changed them all into birds: Munichus into a buzzard, Lelante into a green woodpecker, Alcander into a wren, Hyperippe into a loon, Megaletor into an "ichneumon" and Philaeus into a "dog-bird".
- Munichus or Munychus, son of Panteucles or Pantacles and a king of Athens. He was believed to have been the eponym of the Munichian harbor in Athens and founder of the temple of Artemis Munychia in Peiraeus which he had seized. It was also related that when Orchomenus was invaded by the Thracians, the inhabitants of Orchomenus fled to Munichos who welcomed them, and subsequently named the place where he let them dwell Munichia after the hospitable king. He also appeared in a vase painting alongside other allies of Theseus against the Amazons. A hero cult of him existed, as is evident from an inscription found in Peiraeus that reads: "[name missing], son of Epicharmus, has offered to Munichus".
