= Ambracia (mythology) =

Ambracia in ancient Epirus.

In Greek mythology, Ambracia (Ancient Greek: Άμβρακία) may refer to the following women of whom the city of Ambracia in Epirus was named after:

- Ambracia, a Oeachalian princess and daughter of King Melaneus, son of Apollo and Oechalia, and the sister of Eurytus.
- Ambracia, an Elean princess as daughter of King Augeas of Elis.

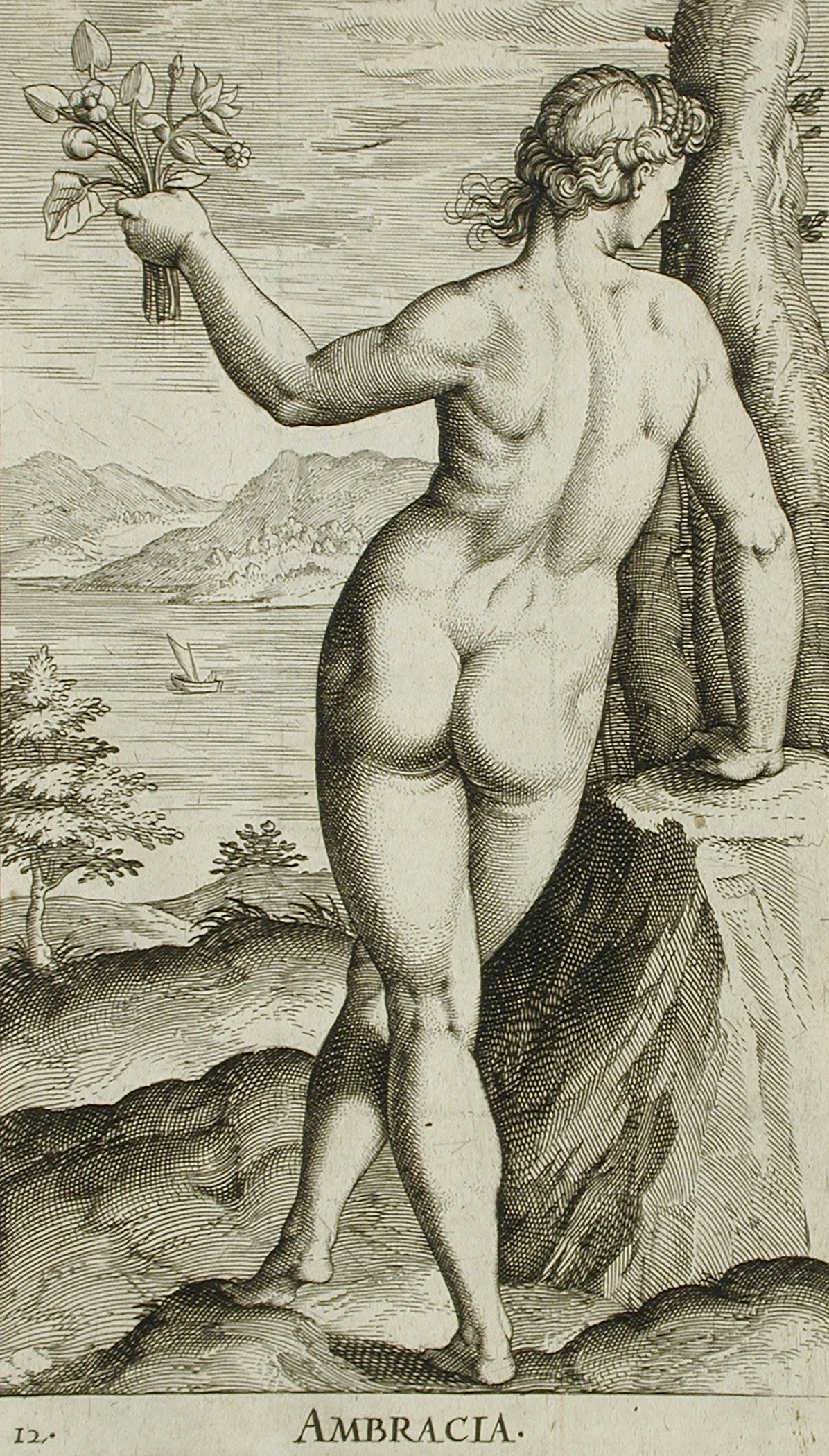
Ambracia by Philip Galle (Holland, Haarlem, 1537-1612)
