= Coronaeus =

King of Phocis in Greek mythology

In Greek mythology, King Coronaeus (Ancient Greek: Κορωναῖος) of Phocis was the father of Corone, who was changed into a crow by Athena as she fled from Poseidon.

== See also ==
- List of mortals in Greek mythology
