= Schoeneus =

Name of several figures in Greek mythology

In Greek mythology, Schoeneus (/ˈskɛnˌjuːs/; Ancient Greek: Σχοινεύς, romanized: Skhoineús) was the name of several individuals:

- Schoeneus, a Boeotian king, the son of Athamas and Themisto. He may have immigrated to Arcadia, where a village Schoenous and a river Schoeneus flowing by it were believed to have been named after him, and where his children were believed to have originated. He was the father of Atalanta, and also of the Arcadian Clymenus.
- Schoeneus, son of Autonous (son of Melaneus) and Hippodamia. He was the brother of Erodius, Acanthus, Acanthis and Anthus. When the latter was killed by their father's horses, Zeus and Apollo pitied Schoeneus and transformed him into a bird.
- Schoeneus, a man who reared Orestes, from whose home Orestes directed to Argos to avenge the death of his father on Clytaemnestra.
