= Amphimedon =

Suitor of Penelope in Homer's Odyssey

For the genus of sponge, see Amphimedon (sponge)

In Homer's Odyssey, Amphimedon (/æmˈfɪmɪˌdɒn, -dən/; Ancient Greek: Ἀμφιμέδων) was the Ithacan son of Melaneus and one of the suitors of Penelope.

== Mythology ==
While retreating from Odysseus's party during the final stages of the battle in the latter's hall, Amphimedon gave a glancing blow to the carapace of Telemachus, to whom he fell shortly afterwards. In the Underworld, he told the story of the suitors' slaughter by Odysseus and Telemachus.
