= Athanadas =

Ancient Greek writer

Athanadas (Ancient Greek: Ἀθανάδας) was a writer of ancient Greece. We know from the writer Antoninus Liberalis that he wrote a work on the city of Ambracia, titled Ambrakika (Ἀμβρακικά), but none of his works survive. His time is unknown, but the scholar Felix Jacoby believed he lived around the 3rd century BCE, and was a native of Ambracia.

There was also a probably unrelated man of this name—Athenadas of Rhegium, son of Zopyros—who was a citharode who performed in the Delphic Soteria in 150 BCE.
