= Anthus (mythology) =

Set of mythological Greek characters

In Greek mythology, the name Anthus (Ancient Greek: Ἄνθος, romanized: Ánthos, lit. 'flower, bloom, blossom') may refer to:

- Anthus, a son of Autonous and Hippodamia. His brothers were Erodius, Schoeneus and Acanthus, and his sister was Acanthis. Once he drove his father's horses away from the grassy meadows, where they had been pastured by his brother Erodius. Out of hunger, the horses attacked Anthus and devoured him; his father was in shock and could not help, while his mother tried to save him but failed because of her physical weakness. Zeus and Apollo, out of pity for the grieving family, transformed the members into birds. Anthus himself was metamorphosed into a bird called "anthus" which imitated the neighing of a horse, but always fled from the sight of a horse. His servant, who failed to protect the master, was transformed into a white heron. The bird genus Anthus is thus named after him.
- Anthus of Anthedon, who went missing when he was a child. His brother Hyperes set out to search for him and eventually was received as guest by Acastus of Pherae, in whose household Anthus had ended up serving as a cup-bearer. As Anthus came up to his brother to serve him wine, he recognized him and whispered a rhyme to him: "Drink wine with lees, 'cause you dwell not in Anthedon". The same poetic line was otherwise said to be part of an oracular prophecy. Certain companions of Anthus and Hyperes were said to have settled in the island Calauria (previously known as Eirene, after Eirene) and to have called it Anthedonia and Hypereia.
