= Battle of Idomene =

Battle during the Peloponnesian War (426 BC)

- Part of the Peloponnesian War
Date	426 BC
Location	Idomene
Result	Athenian victory

Belligerents
Athens; Amphilochia; Acarnanian League	Ambracia

Commanders and leaders
Demosthenes	Unknown

Strength
7,000	6,000

Casualties and losses
400	1,000

The Battle of Idomene took place during the Peloponnesian War in 426 BC, between the Athenians and the Ambracians.

The Ambracians, who were allies of the Spartans, had sent a relief force to help the army that had invaded Amphilochia previously. Unbeknownst to the Ambracians, the first army had been defeated, surrounded and scattered by the allied Athenians, Amphilochians and Acarnanians the day before. The Ambracians, unaware of the incoming Athenian army, camped on the lower of two steep hills. Demosthenes, the Athenian commander, occupied the higher hill, obtaining a strategic advantage. Before dawn, while the Ambracians were still asleep, they were attacked and destroyed by the Athenians.

Overall, the Ambraciots lost about 1,000 men over the two battles. Thucydides describes this disaster: "Indeed, this was by far the greatest disaster that befell any one Hellenic city in an equal number of days during this war; and I have not set down the number of the dead, because the amount stated seems so out of proportion to the size of the city as to be incredible".
