= Orchis (mythology) =

Unattested tale from Greek mythology

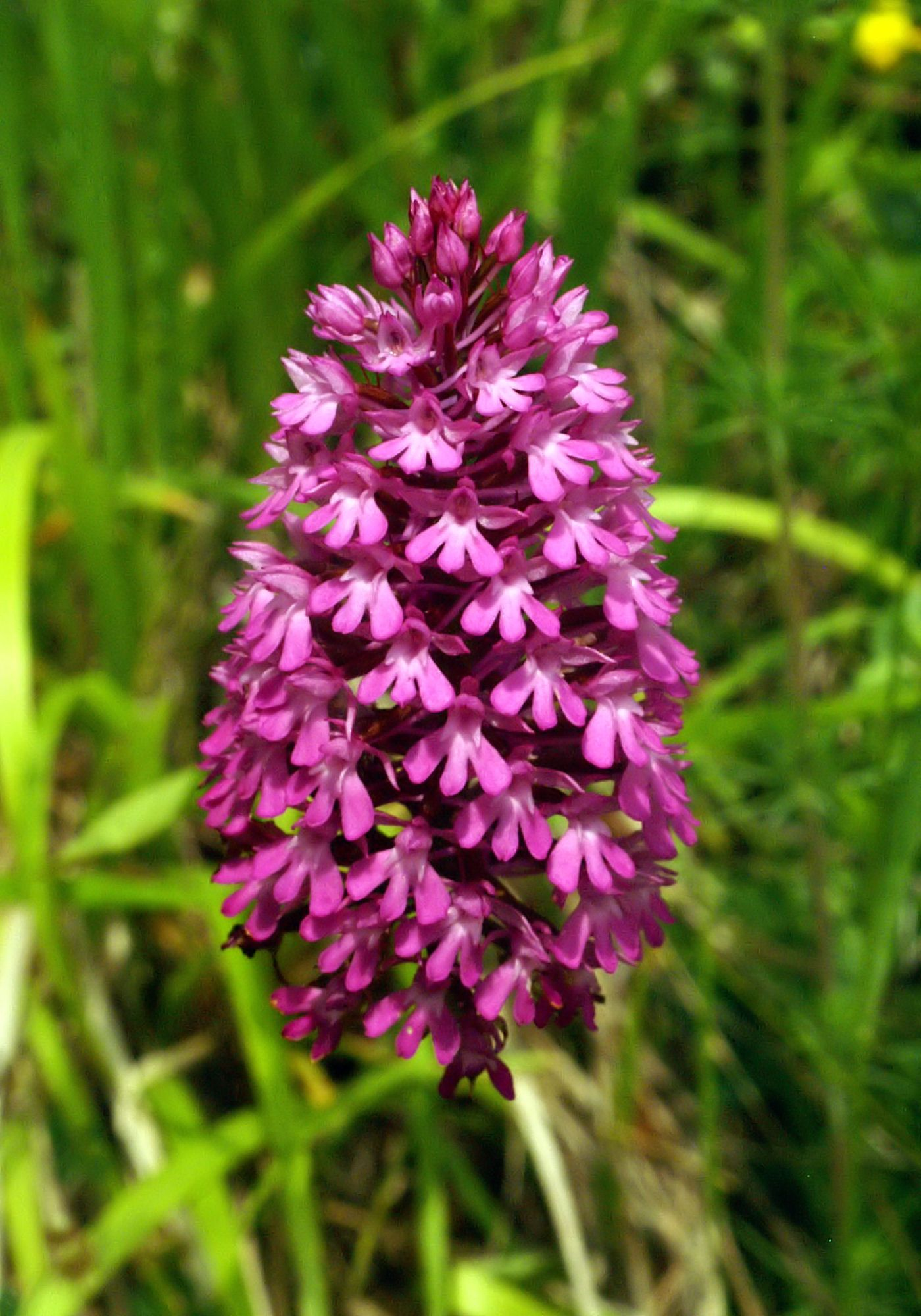
Pyramid-like orchid in Greece.

Orchis (Ancient Greek: Ὄρχις, romanized: Órkhis, lit. 'testicle, orchid') is often claimed to be a minor character in Greek mythology whose transformation is the origin of the orchid flower. However, Orchis's existence and myth does not seem to be attested in classical times.

== The story ==
The unattested myth supposedly goes that Orchis was the son of a nymph and a satyr whose names are usually not disclosed, though sometimes given as Acolasia (Note: Ἀκολασία (akolasía) is a proper noun meaning 'intemperance', and later 'debauchery'.) and Patellanus (in some accounts, he is said to be the son of the fertility god Priapus). One day, during a festival in honour of Dionysus the god of wine, Orchis raped or attempted to rape one of Dionysus's priestesses, so the god killed him. His father mourned his death and asked the gods to bring him back, but they refused, and instead settled on creating the orchid flower out of him. An alternative version of his death has him being torn apart by wild animals or the priestesses themselves, and, through the intervention of the gods, the orchid grows from his testicles.

== Background ==
Over the years, this story has been repeated in books (mostly those on herbology), websites, and journals, however, none are known to have included a citation to a specific original source dating to ancient Greece or Rome.

The story cannot be found in modern high-quality encyclopedias noted for their completeness regarding ancient Greek mythology, such as the German encyclopedia Der Neue Pauly, which is considered to be an unparalleled masterpiece of classical German scholarship, the Dictionary of Greek and Roman Biography and Mythology by William Smith, which has been praised for its thorough and accurate entries that draw directly from ancient literary sources, or in Paul M. C. Forbes Irving's Metamorphosis in Greek Myths, a work specifically dealing with the themes of transformation in Greek mythology.

"Orchis" as a proper name, and the names sometimes given to his parents, Patellanus and Acolasia, do not appear anywhere before 1704, the year when French writer Louis Liger published a gardening book called Le Jardinier Fleuriste et Historiographe ("the floristic and historical gardener"). Liger's book is the oldest known work where Orchis's tale appears, and it is considered likely that it was his own invention, although it does borrow elements from genuine myths, such as those of Pentheus (who is torn apart) and Hyacinthus (who dies and is transformed into a flower).

The orchid was known to the ancient Greeks, and they did make a connection between the plant and satyrs: early herbalists would call the orchid 'satyrion'. It was seen as an aphrodisiac, and some species (particularly the orchis italica) were thought to resemble a little satyr in shape. Theophrastus, author of one of the most important books of natural history written in ancient times, wrote that they were called thus due to their round roots, which bore a resemblance to human testicles, and recorded their healing and aphrodisiac properties. Orchids were thought to help produce male progeny if given to men, or female progeny if given to women.

Another similar myth is the story of Butes, a Thracian man who raped Coronis, a follower of Dionysus. She called upon her god, and he punished Butes by driving him mad and ended with his falling to his death down a well.

== See also ==
- Acantha
- Amethyste
- Clytie
- Rainbow crow

== Bibliography ==
- Beekes, Robert S. P. (2010). Lucien van Beek (ed.). Etymological Dictionary of Greek. Leiden Indo-European Etymological Dictionary Series. Vol. ΙΙ. Leiden, the Netherlands: Brill Publications. ISBN 978-90-04-17419-1.
- Bernhardt, Peter (2008). Gods and Goddesses in the Garden: Greco-Roman Mythology and the Scientific Names of Plants. Rutgers University Press. ISBN 978-0-8135-4266-9.
- Diodorus Siculus (1933–1967). Historic library. Loeb Classical Library, 12 volumes. Vol. 6. Translated by C. H. Oldfather. Harvard University Press.
- Endersby, Jim (November 7, 2016). Orchid: A Cultural History. Chicago, London: University of Chicago Press. ISBN 978-0-226-37632-5.
- Farrar, Linda (February 29, 2016). Gardens and Gardeners of the Ancient World: History, Myth and Archaeology. United Kingdom: Oxbow Books. ISBN 978-1-909686-85-4.
- Folkard, Richard (1884). Plant Lore, Legends, and Lyrics: Embracing the Myths, Traditions, Superstitions, and Folk-lore of the Plant Kingdom. Michigan: S. Low, Marston, Searle, and Rivington.
- Hixson, Joan E. (April 15, 2015). Growing Orchids Like A Pro: The Complete Guide on How to Grow Orchids. Living Plus Healthy Publishing.
- Joshi, Devi Datt (November 2, 2012). Herbal Drugs and Fingerprints: Evidence Based Herbal Drugs. New York, London: Springer Science+Business Media. ISBN 978-81-322-0803-7.
- Liddell, Henry George; Scott, Robert (1940). A Greek-English Lexicon, revised and augmented throughout by Sir Henry Stuart Jones with the assistance of Roderick McKenzie. Oxford: Clarendon Press. Online version at Perseus.tufts project.
- Sheela, V. L. (March 5, 2008). Flowers for Trade. New Delhi: New India Publishing Agency. ISBN 978-81-89422-51-6.
- Zining, Mok (August 12, 2020). The Orchid Folios. Ethos books. ISBN 978-981-14-4294-0.
