= Corone (crow) =

Greek mythological woman

- Princess of Phocis
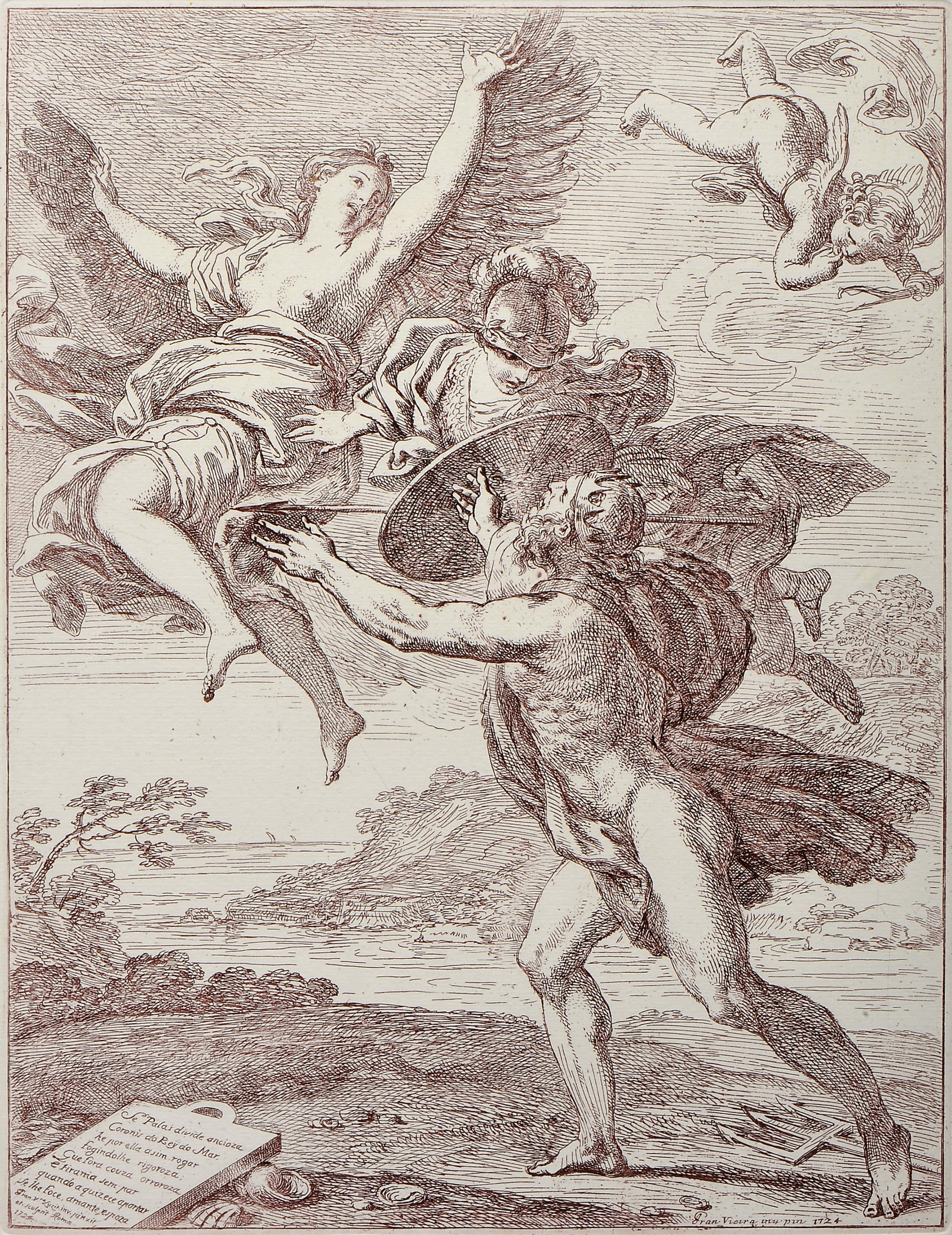
- Neptune and Corone, 1724 engraving by Vieira Lusitano.
- Gender: Female
- Region: Phocis

Genealogy
- Parents: Coronaeus (father)

In Greek and Roman mythology, Corone (Ancient Greek: Κορώνη, romanized: Korṓnē, lit. 'crow' pronounced [korɔ̌ːnɛː]) is a young woman who attracted the attention of Poseidon, the god of the sea, and was saved by Athena, the goddess of wisdom. She was a princess and the daughter of Coronaeus. Her brief tale is recounted in the narrative poem Metamorphoses by the Roman poet Ovid. Several other myths surround the crow about its connection to Athena.

== Mythology ==
=== Poseidon ===
According to Ovid, one day as Corone was walking by the seashore, the sea-god Poseidon saw her and attempted to seduce her. When his efforts failed, he attempted to rape her instead. However, Corone fled from his rapacious advances, crying out to men and gods. While no man heard her, "the virgin goddess feels pity for a virgin", and so Pallas Athena transformed her into a crow.

An unspecified time later, she recounted her woes during a conversation with the raven, Lycius, who had similar grievances of his own. She also cited her resentment that her place as Athena's bird-servant had been usurped and taken over by the owl, the metamorphosed Nyctimene, because that transformation was punitive.

Ovid himself does not mention her by name and simply calls her cornix, or "the crow", in Latin. Instead her name proper is attested by an anonymous Greek paradoxographer.

=== Other narratives about Athena and crows ===
The relation between Athena and the crow is not always amicable. In one myth, after Hephaestus tried to assault Athena and the infant Erichthonius was born from his semen that fell on the earth, Athena put the child in a box and gave it to the daughters of Cecrops, instructing them not to open the box before she returned. The maidens disobeyed her, and the crow flew to Athena bearing the news. Athena, angered over the ill news the crow had brought her, cursed it to never be able to fly over the Acropolis of Athens again. The narrative featuring Poseidon seems to have developed as an elaboration of this version, as otherwise it has no starting-point in a historical cult of Athena and the crow.

In one of Aesop's fables, a crow invites a dog to a banquet and makes a sacrifice to Athena. The dog remarks that this is no use, as Athena dislikes her. The crow then answers that Athena might not like her, but she will sacrifice to her nonetheless in an effort to make amends with the goddess. A fragment from the Hellenistic poet Callimachus implies the existence of a story, not surviving, where the crow warned the owl (Nyctimene?) against tale-bearing, lamenting that the wrath of Athena is a terrible thing.

The second-century traveller Pausanias wrote that in Corone, a small town in Messenia in southwestern Peloponnese, a statue of Athena held in her outstretched hand a crow instead of the accustomed owl.

== Later literature ==
John Gower took up the tale for use in his Confessio Amantis, with particular emphasis on her delight in her escape:

With feathers of a coaly black,
Out of his arms, like bolt from bow,
She flew in likeness of a crow:
And this, to her, was more delight -
To keep her maiden treasure white
Beneath a feather cloak of black -
Than, pearly-skinned, to lose and lack
What never can return again.

== See also ==
- Coronis
- Daphne
- Nyctaea
- Side

== Bibliography ==
- Callimachus (2022). Hecale, Hymns, Epigrams. Loeb Classical Library 129. Translated by Dee L. Clayman. Cambridge, MA: Harvard University Press.
- Forbes Irving, Paul M. C. (1990). Metamorphosis in Greek Myths. Oxford Classical Monographs. Oxford, New York, Toronto: Oxford University Press, Clarendon Press. ISBN 0-19-814730-9.
- Gaius Julius Hyginus, Fabulae from The Myths of Hyginus translated and edited by Mary Grant. University of Kansas Publications in Humanistic Studies. Online version at the Topos Text Project.
- Gale, Monica R. (November 9, 2000). Virgil on the Nature of Things: The Georgics, Lucretius and the Didactic. Cambridge, New York: Cambridge University Press. ISBN 0-511-03071-1.
- Gibbs, Laura (2002). Aesop's Fables. A new translation by Laura Gibbs. Oxford: Oxford University Press (World's Classics).
- Harding, Phillip (October 31, 2007). The Story of Athens: The Fragments of the Local Chronicles of Attika. London, New York: Routledge. ISBN 978-0-203-44834-2.
- Liddell, Henry George; Scott, Robert (1940). A Greek-English Lexicon, revised and augmented throughout by Sir Henry Stuart Jones with the assistance of Roderick McKenzie. Oxford: Clarendon Press. Online version at Perseus.tufts project.
- Pausanias (1918). Description of Greece. Translated by W.H.S. Jones; H.A. Ormerod. Cambridge, MA: Harvard University Press. in 4 Volumes.
- Publius Ovidius Naso, Metamorphoses translated by Brookes More (1859–1942). Boston, Cornhill Publishing Co. 1922. Online version at the Perseus Digital Library.
- Publius Ovidius Naso, Metamorphoses. Hugo Magnus. Gotha (Germany). Friedr. Andr. Perthes. 1892. Latin text available at the Perseus Digital Library.
- Sax, Boria (April 4, 2003). Crow. London, UK: Reaktion Boos LTD. ISBN 1-86189-194-6.
- Westermann, Anton (1839). Paradoxographoe. London: Harvard College Library.
- Tripp, Edward (June 1970). Crowell's Handbook of Classical Mythology (1st ed.). Thomas Y. Crowell Co. ISBN 069022608X.
