= Kafr Ammar =

Kafr Ammar كفر عمّار
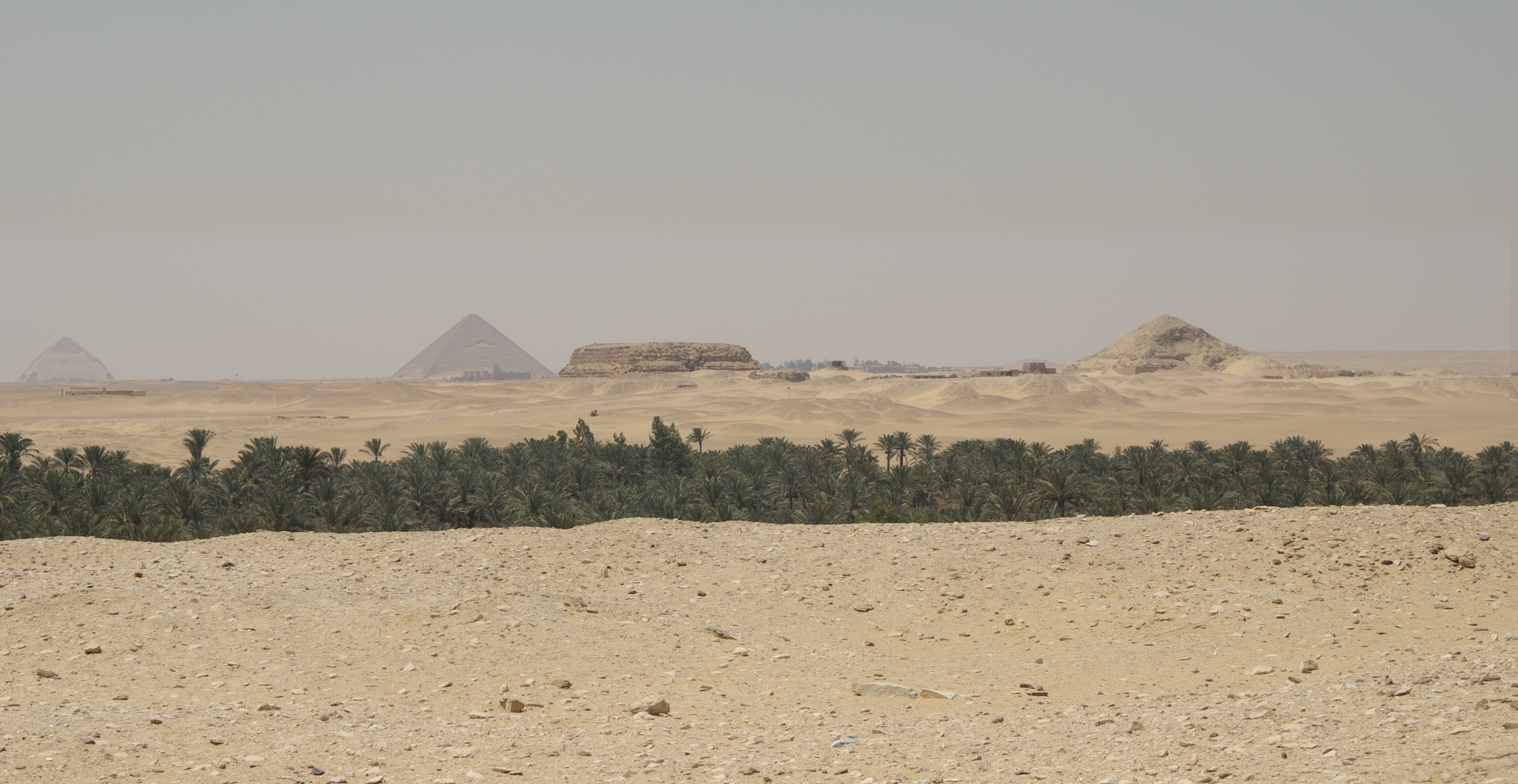
- Landscape around Kafr Ammar, with the Bent and Red pyramids of Sneferu, Mastabat al-Fir'aun, and Pyramid of Pepi II visible in the background

- Location in Egypt
- Coordinates: 29°29′53.03″N 31°14′7.04″E
- Country: Egypt
- Governorate: Gharbia
- Markaz: El Ayyat

Population
  - Total: 10,360
- Time zone: UTC+2 (EET)
  - Summer (DST): UTC+3 (EEST)

Kafr Ammar (Arabic: كفر عمّار) is a village in the Giza Governorate of Egypt.

The modern village is located on the site of the ancient city of Acanthus (Greek: Ἄκανθος; in Ptolemy, Ἀκανθῶν Πόλις), also known as Tenis (Ancient Greek: Τηνις), on the western bank of the Nile, 120 stadia south of Memphis. The town was situated in the Memphite Nome, and therefore in the Heptanomis. It was renowned for a temple dedicated to Osiris and derived its name from a sacred enclosure composed of acanthus plants.

Some scholars identify it with the ancient Egyptian city of Shena-chen (Ancient Egyptian: Šnʿ-ẖn) or Shenou-anchou (Ancient Egyptian: Šn.w-ʿnḫ.w, lit. 'living trees').

== See also ==
- List of ancient Egyptian towns and cities
- Tarkhan (Egypt)
