= Artemiche =

Greek mythological figure

In-universe information
- Gender: Female
- Title: Noblewoman
- Relatives: Clinis (father); Harpe (mother); Harpasus, Lycius, Ortygius (brothers)
- Birthplace: Babylon

In Greek mythology, Artemiche (Ancient Greek: Ἀρτεμίχη, romanized: Artemikhe) is a minor figure, the daughter of a rich Babylonian man named Clinis by his wife Harpe, and thus the only sister of Lycius, Harpasus and Ortygius. She was transformed into a bird by Artemis and Leto after her family angered Apollo, whom they had venerated greatly in the past.

== Mythology ==
One day her father Clinis, having witnessed the Hyperboreans sacrifice donkeys to Apollo, meant to do the same. But Apollo forbid so, under the pain of death. Artemiche and her brother Ortygius persuaded their father to obey the god, while Harparus and Lycius wanted to sacrifice the donkeys. Clinis ended up listening to Artemiche and Ortygius, but their two brothers decided to proceed with the sacrifice anyway. Apollo turned the donkeys mad as punishment, who began to devour the family. They all cried for help. Leto and Artemis decided to save Clinis, Ortygius and Artemiche, as they had done nothing wrong in obeying Apollo. Apollo allowed them to save them by changing them into birds. Artemiche herself was turned into a lark.

== See also ==
- Meleagrids
- Erodius
- Autonous

== Bibliography ==
- Antoninus Liberalis, The Metamorphoses of Antoninus Liberalis translated by Francis Celoria (Routledge 1992). Online version at the Topos Text Project.
- Celoria, Francis (1992). The Metamorphoses of Antoninus Liberalis: A Translation with a Commentary. Routledge. ISBN 0-415-06896-7.
