= Lycius (son of Clinis) =

Greek mythological character

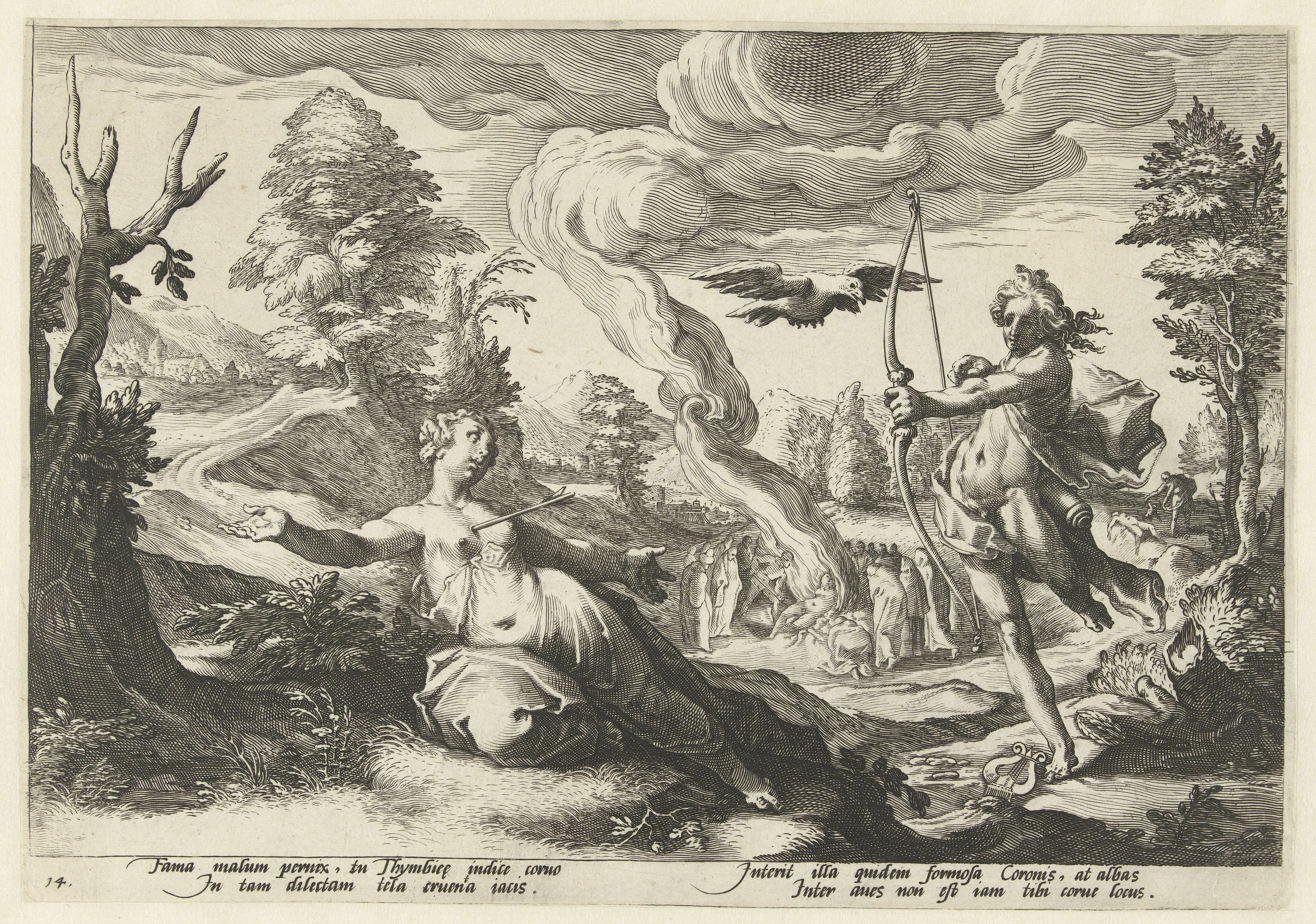
Lycius as a bird watches Apollo kill Coronis, 1590 engraving by Hendrick Goltzius

Lycius (Ancient Greek: Λύκιος, romanized: Lúkios, meaning 'Lycian' or 'wolf-like') is a minor Near Eastern figure in Greek mythology, who features in two minor myths concerning the god Apollo. He was originally a man born to a wealthy family who disobeyed the orders of Apollo, thus becoming a white raven. Later the god made him his watchman.

== Family ==
Lycius was one of the four children born to a rich Mesopotamian man named Clinis and his wife Harpe. He had two brothers, Harpasus and Ortygius, and a sister named Artemiche.

== Mythology ==
=== Donkey sacrifice ===
When his father Clinis saw the Hyperboreans sacrifice donkeys to Apollo, he meant to do the same, only to be prohibited under pain of death by the god himself. Lycius and Harpasus both urged their father to sacrifice the donkeys nevertheless, but Clinis called off the sacrifice, convinced by his other children Ortygius and Artemiche who advised him to obey Apollo. Lycius and Harpasus undid the halters of the donkeys anyway, and set to drive them towards the altar, thereupon Apollo drove the animals insane. The donkeys then proceeded to attack and began to devour the entire family savagely. In distress, the six of them begged the gods to help them, and they were all transformed into various birds as their prayers were heard. Lycius was changed into a white raven by Apollo, the only member of the family to be saved directly by him.

=== Coronis ===
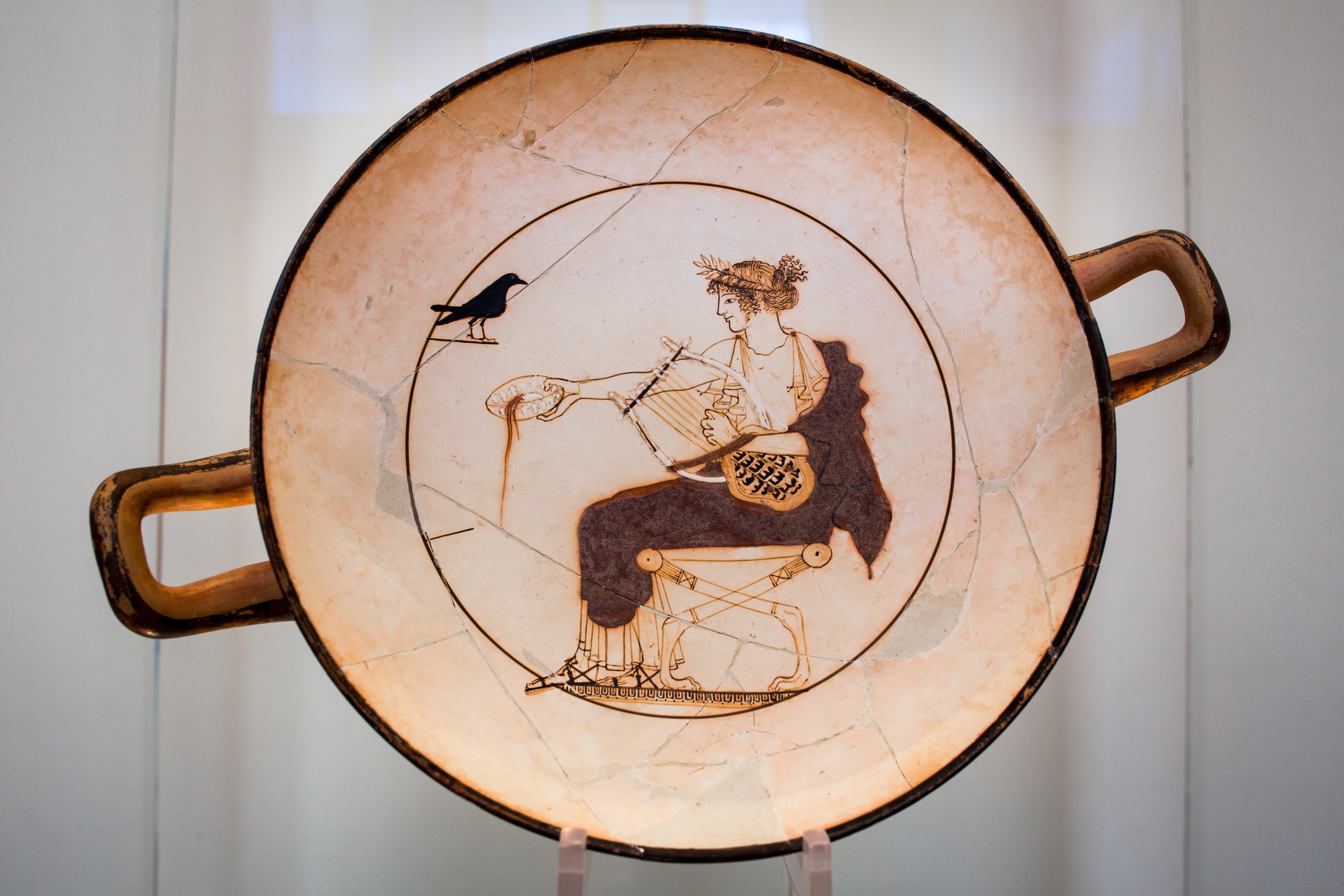
Apollo and a black bird on a 480s-470s BC kylix from Delphi, now in the Delphi Archaeological Museum, Greece.

Sometime later, Lycius—now as a raven—was tasked by Apollo to watch over Apollo's pregnant lover Coronis ("crow") while he was gone. The unfaithful Coronis however then proceeded to cheat on Apollo with a mortal man named Ischys or Alcyoneus. Lycius immediately flew to Apollo to break the news of Coronis's infidelity to him. Enraged, Apollo took out his anger on Lycius, who instead had expected some sort of reward for his good job, and changed him into a black raven.

An unspecified time after this event, the disillusioned Lycius recounted his woes during a conversation with the crow, who was once a woman named Corone and who also had a similar grievance of her own concerning a deity that did not appreciate their avian messenger bringing them ill news.

According to Istrus, a Greek historian, Lycius was eventually turned into the constellation of Corvus.

== Cultural background ==
Lycius was an epithet of Apollo himself, variously connected to the land of Lycia, wolves (Greek lykos) or more plausibly light (Greek lyke). Clinis' choice to name all of his children (except for Harpasus) after both Artemis and Apollo shows obsequiousness, though it might have been a deliberate narrative choice by the storyteller to serve as foreshadowing. "Mesopotamia, near the city of Babylon" as the homeland of the family was likely a fanciful use of an eastern, exotic place to create some atmosphere. In ancient Greece, a 'white raven' came to be a proverbial expression about things that did not exist or were very unlikely to happen.

== See also ==
- Achilles (son of Zeus)
- Iynx
- Arge

== Bibliography ==
- Antoninus Liberalis, The Metamorphoses of Antoninus Liberalis translated by Francis Celoria (Routledge 1992). Online version at the Topos Text Project.
- Apollodorus, Apollodorus, The Library, with an English Translation by Sir James George Frazer, F.B.A., F.R.S. in 2 Volumes. Cambridge, MA, Harvard University Press; London, William Heinemann Ltd. 1921. Online version at the Perseus Digital Library.
- Arnott, W. Geoffrey (September 12, 2007). Birds in the Ancient World from A to Z. London and New York: Routledge. ISBN 978-0-415-23851-9.
- Celoria, Francis (October 24, 1992). The Metamorphoses of Antoninus Liberalis: A Translation with a Commentary'. USA, Canada: Routledge. ISBN 0-415-06896-7.
- Hyginus, Gaius Julius, De astronomia, in The Myths of Hyginus, edited and translated by Mary A. Grant, Lawrence: University of Kansas Press, 1960. Online version at ToposText.
- Ovid, Metamorphoses, Volume I: Books 1-8. Translated by Frank Justus Miller. Revised by G. P. Goold. Loeb Classical Library 42. Cambridge, MA: Harvard University Press, 1916.
- Stoneman, Richard (1995). Greek Mythology: An Encyclopedia of Myth and Legend. Diamond Books. ISBN 9780261666528.
