= Acantha =

Unattested tale from Greek mythology

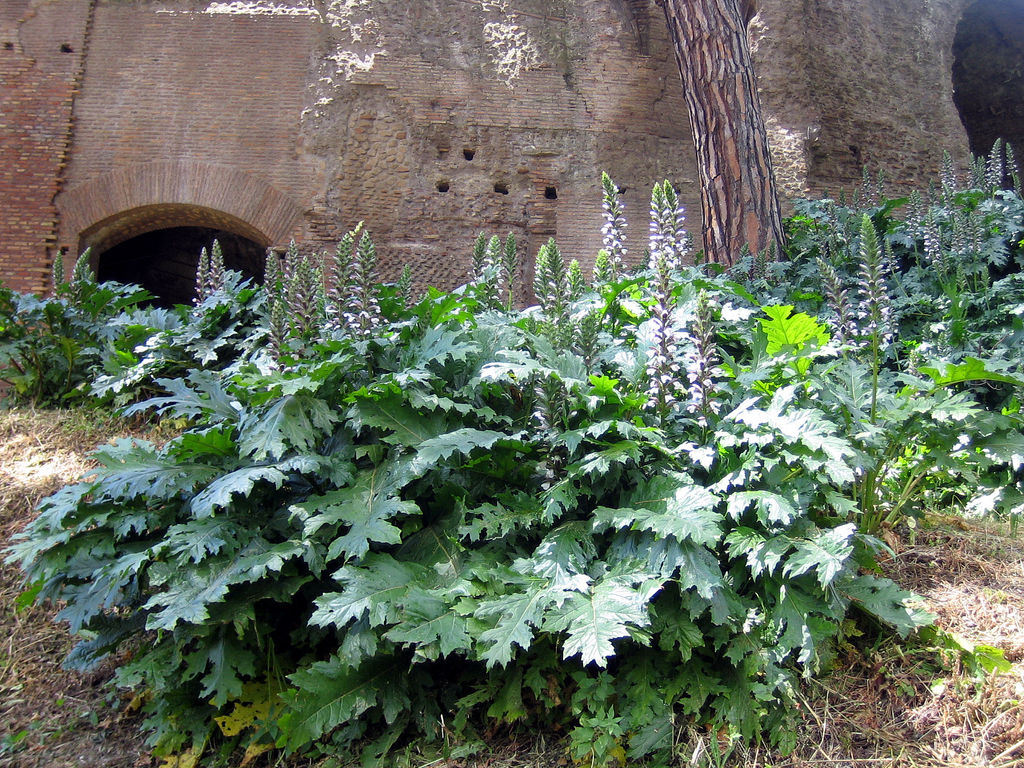
Acanthus mollis on the ruins of the Palatine Hill, Rome.

Acantha (Ancient Greek: Ἀκάνθα, romanized: Akántha, lit. 'thorn') is often claimed to be a minor character in Greek mythology whose metamorphosis was the origin of the Acanthus plant. Acantha's myth, however, does not appear in any classical source.

== Mythology ==
The tale supposedly goes that Acantha was a nymph loved by the god Apollo. Acantha, however, rebuffed Apollo's continued advances and scratched his face. As a result, Apollo transformed her into the Acanthus, a plant with spiny leaves.

== Origin of the myth ==
The story has, over the years, been retold in books, encyclopedias, and journals. Compilers have, however, often omitted reference to classical sources. For instance, the first edition of John Lemprière's Bibliotheca Classica, an early encyclopaedia of mythological figures, provides no reference for the story. In the updated 1839 edition three references are given. These are to Pliny the Elder's Natural History, Pedanius Dioscorides' De Materia Medica and Hesychius of Alexandria's Lexicon. On inspection, however, Pliny makes absolutely no reference to Acantha, Dioscorides refers only to the plant and Hesychius simply explains what the word means. A number of latter compilers have similarly not cited classical references when retelling the myth.

The myth does not appear in the Thesaurus Linguae Latinae, a volume which includes every Latin word, including proper names. The Thesaurus Linguae Graecae, a similarly comprehensive source containing a complete repository of Ancient Greek texts from Homer through to A.D. 200, is also absent the myth. The story is not present in either the Lexicon Iconographicum Mythologiae Classicae, a work praised for its breadth and quality, or Der Neue Pauly, an encyclopaedia considered an unparalleled masterpiece of classical German scholarship.

Acantha's tale has lifted elements from the myth of Oenone, a nymph who scratched Apollo's face while he raped her, as attested in the poem Fasti by the Roman poet Ovid; that text however has been extended with various spurious post-Ovidian interpolations, and Oenone's rape is, like Acantha herself, otherwise unattested. According to Cicero a woman named Acantho became the mother of the "fourth sun" in Rhodes.

== See also ==
- Syrinx
- Daphne
- Pitys (mythology)
- Hyacinth (mythology)
- Leda and the Swan
- Europa (consort of Zeus)
- Erinoma
- Ganymede (mythology)
- Clytie
- Mecon
- Asteria
- Myrina
- Lotis
- Orchis
- Amethyste
- Rhodanthe
