= Acanthis (mythology) =

In Greek mythology, the daughter of Hippodamia and Autonous

- Transformed into a bird

Genealogy
- Parents: Hippodamia and Autonous
- Siblings: Anthus, Erodius, Schoeneus and Acanthus

In Greek mythology, Acanthis (Ancient Greek: Ἀκανθίς means 'thornette') or Acanthyllis (Ἀκανθυλλίς) was the daughter of Hippodamia and Autonous and sister to Anthus, Erodius, Schoeneus and Acanthus.

== Mythology ==
When their father's horses attacked Anthus out of hunger and ate him, Zeus and Apollo, out of pity for the grieving family, transformed them into birds. Acanthis thus became a thistle finch.

In Antoninus Liberalis, Metamorphoses, 7 recounts the whole story of Acanthis and her family's unfortunate fate:

Autonous, the son of Melaneus and Hippodamia, had four sons: Erodius, Anthus, Schoeneus, and Acanthus, along with a daughter named Acanthis, who was granted great beauty by the gods. Autonous amassed many herds of horses, which were cared for by his wife Hippodamia and their children. However, due to his neglect of farming, the vast lands of Autonous yielded no crops, only rushes and thistles. Consequently, he named his children after such plants: Acanthus, Schoeneus, and Acanthis, while his eldest son Erodius was named for the erosion of his lands.

Erodius had a deep affection for the herds of horses he pastured in the meadows. When Anthus, the son of Autonous, drove the mares from their pastures, they became furious and turned on him. They began to devour him as he cried out to the gods for salvation. In a state of panic and distress, his father wavered, as did the servant who accompanied the youth, both failing to drive off the mares. Meanwhile, the mother continued to struggle against the mares, but her weakened state hindered her ability to prevent the tragedy.

While the people mourned for Anthus, who was hardly dead, Zeus and Apollo took pity on them and transformed them all into birds. Autonous was turned into a quail because, although he was the father of Anthus, he had quailed at the thought of driving off the horses. The mother was transformed into a lark with a crested head, as she had bravely approached the mares to defend her son. Anthus himself, along with Erudius, Schoeneur, Acanthus, and Acanthyllis, were all metamorphosed into birds that retained their original names. The servant who had attended to Anthus was turned into a heron [erōdios]—the same as Erodius, the brother of the lad Anthus—but it was not of the same kind. This heron is notably smaller than the dark variety. It does not associate with the anthus bird, just as the anthus bird does not associate with horses, due to Anthus’s painful experiences with them. Even today, when this heron hears a horse neigh, it flies away while mimicking the sound.
