= Aëtos =

Greek mythological character

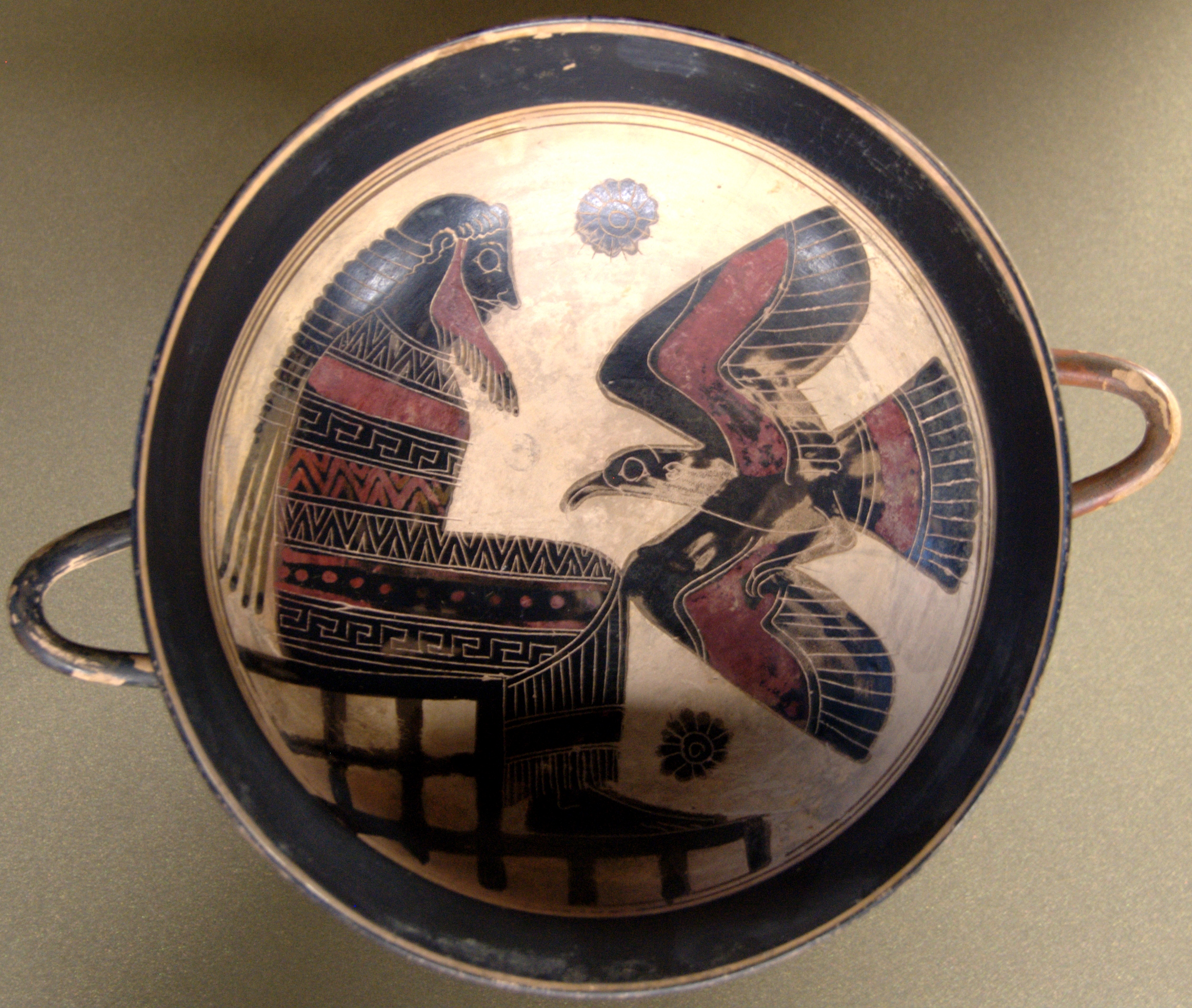
Zeus and an eagle, krater (c. 560 BC), now in the Louvre

In Greek mythology, Aëtos (Greek: Ἀετός, romanized: Aetós, lit. 'eagle') is an earth-born childhood companion of Zeus, the king of the gods, who served as the origin of the Eagle of Zeus, the most prominent symbol of the god of thunder.

== Mythology ==
According to the myth, Aëtos was a beautiful boy who was born from the earth (autochthon) in Crete. While Zeus was young and hiding in Crete from his father Cronus who had devoured all of Zeus's siblings, Aëtos became friends with the god and was the first one to swear fealty to him as new king. But years later, after Zeus had overthrown his father and become king in his place, Zeus's wife Hera turned Aëtos into an eagle, out of fear that Zeus loved him. Thus the eagle became the sacred bird of Zeus, and a symbol of power and kingship. Aëtos even assisted Zeus during the Titanomachy and the Gigantomachy, by placing lightning bolts on Zeus's hands.

Aëtos's story is similar to sometimes attributed Ganymede, Zeus's cupbearer and eromenos, who was abducted by an eagle, which was Aëtos sent by Zeus, or Zeus himself in the form of an eagle.

Aëtos was also the eagle Zeus sent, daily at dawn, to claw-out and eat the Titan Prometheus's liver, only for his liver to grow-back nightly and for this sentence to begin-again the next morning. Aëtos was later killed by Heracles, during his 11th Labour. Heracles came across Prometheus on his journey, needing information; Heracles shot the eagle eating at Prometheus's liver and set him free and, in return, Prometheus helped Heracles with knowledge that his brother, Atlas, the father of the Hesperides, would know where their garden with the Golden apples was.

== See also ==
- Periphas
- Argus Panoptes
- Daphne

== Bibliography ==
- Kerenyi, Karl (1951). The Gods of the Greeks. London: Thames and Hudson.
- Maurus Servius Honoratus, In Vergilii carmina comentarii. Servii Grammatici qui feruntur in Vergilii carmina commentarii; recensuerunt Georgius Thilo et Hermannus Hagen. Georgius Thilo. Leipzig. B. G. Teubner. 1881. Online version at the Perseus Digital Library.
