= Ambracia =

Ancient city in Greece

- Ἀμβρακία (Greek)
- Arta
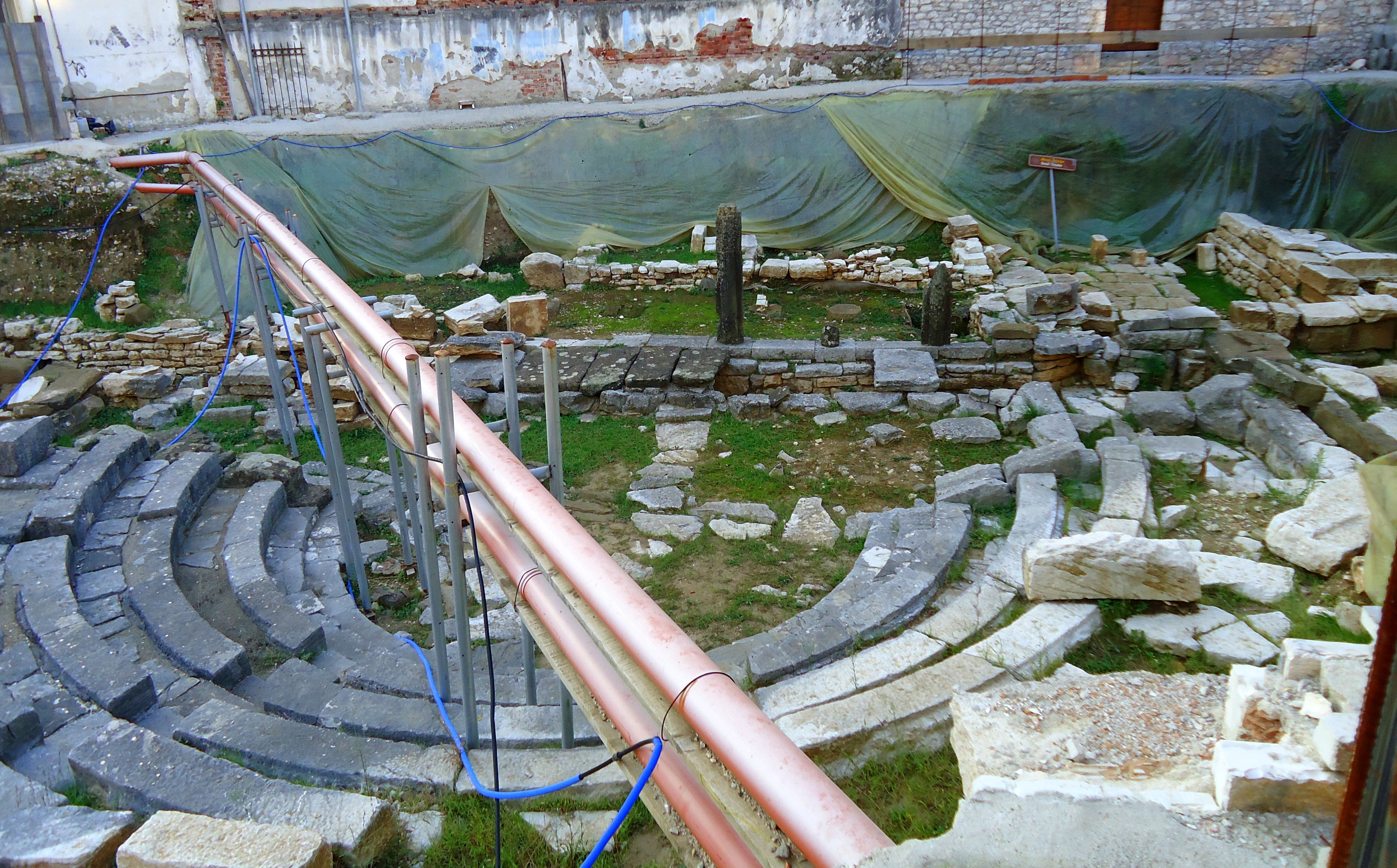
- Small theater at Ambracia

- Ambracia (Balkans)
- 39.158°N 20.987°E
- Type: City
- Periods: Greek, Roman, Byzantine
- Region: Epirus

Ambracia (/æmˈbreɪʃə/; Ancient Greek: Ἀμβρακία, occasionally Ἀμπρακία, Ampracia) was a city of ancient Greece on the site of modern Arta. It was founded by the Corinthians in 625 BC and was situated about 11 km (7 mi) from the Ambracian Gulf, on a bend of the navigable river Arachthos (or Aratthus), in the midst of a fertile wooded plain.

== Name ==
It was named after Ambracia, who according to some myths was Augeas daughter, while others describe her as Apollo's granddaughter and the daughter of Melaneus, king of the Dryope.

According to a different story, the town was named after Ambrax, Thesprotus' son and Lycaon's grandson.

== History ==
Ambracia was founded between 650 and 625 BC by Gorgus, son of the Corinthian tyrant Cypselus, at which time its economy was based on farmlands, fishing, timber for shipbuilding, and the exportation of the produce of Epirus. After the expulsion of Gorgus's son Periander its government developed into a strong democracy. The early policy of Ambracia was determined by its loyalty to Corinth (for which it probably served as an entrepot in the Epirus trade), and its consequent aversion to Corcyra (as Ambracia participated on the Corinthian side at the Battle of Sybota, which took place in 433 BC between the rebellious Corinthian colony of Corcyra (modern Corfu) and Corinth).

Ambraciot politics featured many frontier disputes with the Amphilochians and Acarnanians. Hence it took a prominent part in the Peloponnesian War until the crushing defeat at Idomene (426), which crippled its resources.

In the 4th century BC, it continued its traditional policy but in 338 was besieged by Philip II of Macedon. With the assistance of Corinth and Athens, it escaped complete domination at Philip's hands but was nevertheless forced to accept a Macedonian garrison. In 294 BC, after forty-three years of semi-autonomy under Macedonian suzerainty, Ambracia was given by the son of Cassander to Pyrrhus, king of Epirus, who made it his capital and adorned it with palaces, temples, and theatres. In the wars of Philip V of Macedon and the Epirotes against the Aetolian League (220–205), Ambracia passed from one alliance to the other but ultimately joined the latter confederacy. During the struggle of the Aetolians against Rome, it withstood a stubborn siege, including the first known use of poison gas against the Romans' siege tunnels. There was an ancient book, titled Ambrakika (Ἀμβρακικά), by the writer Athanadas, that detailed the history of Ambracia. No copies of the work survive, but it was referred to by later writers such as Antoninus Liberalis as an authority on the subject.

Ambracia was captured and plundered by Marcus Fulvius Nobilior in 189 BC, after which it was declared by Rome a "free city" and gradually fell into insignificance. The foundation by Augustus of Nicopolis, into which the remaining inhabitants were drafted, left the site desolate. In Byzantine times a new settlement took its place under the name of Arta. Some fragmentary walls of large, well-dressed blocks near this latter town indicate the early prosperity of Ambracia.

== Ambraciotes ==
=== Artists ===
- Epigonus of Ambracia, 6th BC musician
- Nicocles, auletes
- Hippasus, tragic actor
- Epicrates of Ambracia, c. 4th BC comic poet

=== Athletes ===
- Sophron, Stadion Olympics 432 BC
- Tlasimachus, Tethrippon and Synoris Olympics 296 BC
- Andromachus, Stadion Olympics 60 BC

=== Various ===
- Silanus of Ambracia, 5th BC seer
- Cleombrotus of Ambracia, student of Plato

== See also ==
- List of cities in ancient Epirus
- List of ancient Greek cities
