= Clinis =

Character in Greek mythology

In Greek mythology, Clinis or Kleinis (Ancient Greek: Κλεῖνις, romanized: Kleínis) was a native of Babylon and father, by Harpe, of three sons, Harpasus, Lycius, and Ortygius, and of a daughter Artemiche.

== Mythology ==
Clinis venerated Apollo and Artemis diligently and was in return favored by the two gods so much that Apollo once took him to the land of the Hyperboreans, where he visited the shrine of the Hyperborean Apollo.

Upon return home, Clinis decided that from now on, he should honor Apollo by sacrificing donkeys to him, just like the Hyperboreans did. But when everything was ready for the sacrifice, Apollo warned Clinis against doing so because donkeys offered by non-Hyperboreans were not the right kind of sacrifice for the god. Then a heated argument arose between the children of Clinis whether to continue with the sacrificial rite or not: Lycius and Harpasus insisted on sacrificing the donkeys nevertheless, while Ortygius and Artemiche maintained that the god's word should be obeyed. Finally, Lycius and Harpasus drove the donkeys to the altar; at the moment, Apollo struck the animals with madness, which caused them to attack and devour Clinis and his family. Poseidon took pity of Harpe and Harpasus and transformed them into birds of the same names; Leto and Artemis implored Apollo to save Clinis, Ortygius and Artemiche, who were not guilty of the impious act, which the god did, changing the rest of the family into birds as well: Clinis into a hypaietos ("under-eagle"), Lycius into a white raven (which became black after the incident with Coronis), Artemiche into a lark, and Ortygius into a tit (Greek aigithos), because he had suggested that his father sacrificed goats (Greek aiges) instead of donkeys.

The story is solely known from Antoninus Liberalis' Metamorphoses; as his own sources, the author cites Boeus and Symmias.
