= Alcander (mythology) =

Three characters in Greek mythology

In Greek mythology, Alcander or Alcandrus (Ancient Greek: Ἄλκανδρος) may refer to the following characters:

- Alcander, a Molossian seer, son of Munichus (son of Dryas), and Lelante. Their home was attacked by bandits, who put fire to their buildings. Since their entire family was beloved by the gods, Zeus then felt pity for them, turning them into various birds instead of letting them die a pitiable death. Alcander was turned into a wren.
- Alcandrus, a Lycian soldier who followed their leader, Sarpedon, to fight in the Trojan War. He was slain by the Greek hero Odysseus during the siege of Troy.
- Alcander, one of the companions of Aeneas in Italy. He was killed by Turnus.
