= Hippodamia (wife of Autonous) =

Ancient Greek mythological figure

- Transformed into a lark

Genealogy
- Consort: Autonous
- Children: Acanthis (mythology), Anthus, Erodius, Schoenous and Acanthus

In Greek mythology, Hippodamia (/,hɪpoʊdəˈmaɪə/; also Hippodamea and Hippodameia; Ancient Greek: Ἱπποδάμεια means 'she who masters horses' derived from ἵππος hippos 'horse' and δαμάζειν damazein 'to tame') was the wife of Autonous, son of Melaneus. She was the mother of Anthus, who was devoured by his father's horses and turned into a bird by Zeus and Apollo. In fact all family members were turned into birds by the gods who felt pity for the family's fate. Hippodamia was turned into a lark. Her other children were Erodius, Schoeneus, Acanthus, and Acanthis.

== Mythology ==
In Antoninus Liberalis, Metamorphoses, Chapter 7 recounts the whole story of Hippodamia and her family's unfortunate fate:

"Autonous, son of Melaneus and Hippodamia, had as sons Erodius, Anthus, Schoeneus and Acanthus, with a daughter Acanthis to whom the gods granted great beauty. Autonous acquired many herds of horses which were pastured by his wife Hippodamia and their children. Now because he neglected husbandry, no crops were produced by the extensive lands of Autonous which bore only rushes and thistles. For this reason he named his children after such plants: Acanthus, Schoeneus and Acanthis, and his oldest son Erodius, because his lands had been eroded.

Erodius was extremely fond of these herds of horses which he pastured in the meadows. When Anthus, son of Autonous, drove the mares out of the meadows, keeping them out from their pastures, they were infuriated and set upon Anthus. They began to devour him as he uttered many a cry to the gods to save him. Now his father, panic-stricken through distress, faltered — as did the servant of the youth — and failed to drive off the mares. The mother went on battling with the mares, but because of weakness of body was unable to do anything to avert the slaughter.

While these people were bewailing Anthus who was hardly dead, Zeus and Apollo felt pity for them and turned them all into birds. Autonous was made a quail because, though father of Anthus, he had quailed at driving off the horses. The mother was turned into a lark with a crested head because she had headed for the mares to fight for her son against them. They turned Anthus himself, as well as Erudius, Schoeneur, Acanthus and Acanthyllis into birds called by the same names as they had before they were metamorphosed. They turned the servant who had attended Anthus into a heron [erōdios] — the same as happened to Erodius the brother of the lad, Anthus — but not the same sort of heron. For it is distinguishably smaller than the dark variety. Now this heron does not associate with the anthus bird just as the anthus bird does not associate with horses, because Anthus had suffered so much from horses. To this day when it hears a horse neigh, this bird flies away while imitating its cries."
