= Autonous =

Character of Greek mythology

In Greek mythology, Autonous (Ancient Greek: Αὐτόνοος, romanized: Autónoos, lit. 'own-minded') was an owner of a large herd of horses which were pastured by his wife and five children. His sole myth survives in a single work, the Metamorphoses of Antoninus Liberalis.

== Family ==
Autonous was the son of Melaneus and husband of Hippodamia. He was father to Anthus, Erodius, Schoeneus, Acanthus and Acanthis.

== Mythology ==
Because Autonous neglected husbandry, the land they lived in produced no crops but only rushes and thistles, that's why all the children of Autonous were named after such plants. Erodius, who loved his father's horses the most, pastured them on grassy meadows, but one day, Anthus drove them out of their familiar pastures. Out of hunger, the horses attacked Anthus and ate him. Autonous, stricken by panic, could not help his son, and neither could Anthus' servant, while Hippodamia was trying to drive the horses off but failed due to her physical weakness. Zeus and Apollo, out of pity for the grieving family, transformed the members into birds. Autonous became a stone curlew (Greek όκνος, because he "was not in time", όκνησε in Greek, to save Anthus), Hippodamia became a lark (the bird has a crest which symbolizes her courage) and Acanthis became a thistle finch; others became birds whose Greek names are the same as their personal names were when they were humans. Erodius and Anthus' servant were transformed into black and white heron respectively; birds of these two species are never seen together.
