= Erodius =

Greek mythological figure

In Greek mythology, Erodius (Ancient Greek: Ἐρῳδιός, romanized: Erōidiós, lit. 'heron') is the son of Autonous (son of Melaneus) and his wife Hippodamia. He features in a brief myth where tragedy strikes his family, and is himself transformed into a heron by Zeus and Apollo. The myth is only preserved in the works of Antoninus Liberalis, a second-century author.

== Etymology ==
The ancient Greek noun ἐρῳδιός translates to heron. According to Robert S. P. Beekes its many variants (such as ἐρωδιός and ῥωδιός) indicate a pre-Greek origin for the word, but also acknowledges that its resemblance to the Latin ardea (meaning the same) is not coincidental.

== Family ==
Erodius had three brothers—Acanthus, Anthus and Schoeneus—and a sister Acanthis. Because his father neglected husbandry, his vast lands produced no crops but only rushes and thistles, and for that reason he named four of his children after such plants, and Erodius for what his land had done. (Note: Francis Celoria translates it in English as 'the land had eroded' in order to keep the pun, but notes that the Greek phrasing makes little sense. The transitive verb (eroesen) indicates the land doing something to 'him' (i.e. Autonous, but perhaps Erodius) and presumably has a negative meaning. Giangrande suggests that the meaning here is that the thorn and thistle-infested land prevented him from going ahead.)

== Mythology ==
The father Autonous owned many horses, which were pastured by the five children and Hippodamia. Erodius loved those horses greatly, so he let them graze in the meadows. One day, Erodius' brother Anthus led the family's mares away from said meadows. The mares went mad, attacked and devoured Anthus as his family watched helplessly, unable to save him. The gods Zeus and Apollo took pity in them and transformed the entire family into birds; the children all became birds reflecting their given names. Erodius became a heron, as did the manservant of the family, though it was a different sort of heron.

== Analysis ==
The myth, which relies on puns between bird and plant names in ancient Greek, has been described as difficult to analyse due to the fact that its original manuscript page is lost and contains textual crux. The ancient Greek word eroidios refers to both herons and bitterns. According to Antoninus Liberalis, the heron Erodius turned into was smaller than the servant, and in his new avian life the heron avoided the anthos, the unidentified bird that Anthus turned into. Possible candidates for Erodius include the grey heron, the great egret and the eurasian bittern.

Several scholars have suggested that the myth originated from Agathon's lost play Anthos, a rare example of ancient Greek tragedy which was not based on pre-existing myths and heroes but was an entirely original work with new, invented characters. H. J. Rose on the other hand believed that Anthos contained the Milesian tale of Cleoboea and Antheus. Celoria similarly disagrees with the proposed theatrical origin of the myth.

== See also ==
Other myths sharing some elements:

- Clinis
- Lycius
- Mares of Diomedes

== Bibliography ==
- Antoninus Liberalis, The Metamorphoses of Antoninus Liberalis translated by Francis Celoria (Routledge 1992). Online version at the Topos Text Project.
- Beekes, Robert S. P. (2009). Lucien van Beek (ed.). Etymological Dictionary of Greek. Leiden Indo-European Etymological Dictionary Series. Vol. 1. Leiden, the Netherlands: Brill Publications. ISBN 978-90-04-17420-7. ISSN 1574-3586.
- Celoria, Francis (1992). The Metamorphoses of Antoninus Liberalis: A Translation with a Commentary. Routledge. ISBN 0-415-06896-7.
- Forbes Irving, Paul M. C. (1990). Metamorphosis in Greek Myths. Clarendon Press. ISBN 0-19-814730-9.
- Giangrande, G. (1987). Bádenas de la Peña, P. (ed.). Athlon: Satura Grammatica in Honorem Francisci R. Adrados (in Spanish). Vol. II. Madrid, Spain.
- Liddell, Henry George; Scott, Robert (1940). A Greek-English Lexicon, revised and augmented throughout by Sir Henry Stuart Jones with the assistance of Roderick McKenzie. Oxford: Clarendon Press. Online version at Perseus.tufts project.
- Pitcher, Seymour M. (1939). "The Anthus of Agathon". The American Journal of Philology. 60 (2): 145–169. doi:10.2307/291196. JSTOR 291196.
- Rose, Herbert J. (2004). A Handbook of Greek Mythology (6th ed.). London, New York: Routledge. ISBN 0-415-04601-7.
