= Melaneus (son of Apollo) =

Ancient Greek mythological king

In Greek mythology, Melaneus (/ˈmɛlənˌjuːs/; Ancient Greek: Μελανεύς, romanized: Melaneús) was the founder of Oechalia (Oikhalia), variously located in Thessaly, Messenia or Euboea and also king of the Dryopes.

== Biography ==
Melaneus was a noted archer, inheriting Apollo's archery skills. Apollo, his father, carried his bride-to-be Stratonice away from her father's home to marry his son. Stratonice was a Calydonian princess, the daughter of King Porthaon by his wife Laothoe. By her, Melaneus became the father of Eurytus, the famous archer whose reputation overshadowed his father, and of Ambracia, eponym of Ambracia in Epirus. Alternatively, Melaneus was the husband of Oechalia (merely the eponym of the kingdom he was assigned to by Perieres).

== Mythology ==
=== Antoninus's account ===
In Antoninus Liberalis, Metamorphoses recounts the dispute between Apollo, Artemis and Heracles about the patronage of the city of Ambracia. Here Apollo raise his claim by stating that his descendants established the city of Ambracia:

This Cragaleus was at this time already an old man and was considered by his countrymen to be just and wise. While he was pasturing his cattle, Apollo, Artemis and Heracles introduced themselves to him since they wanted a decision about Ambracia in Epirus. Apollo said that the city belonged to him because Melaneus– his son– had become king of the Dryopes having taken in war the whole of Epirus. Melaneus had as sons Eurytus and Ambracias, after whom the city of Ambracia is named. Apollo himself had shown great favour to this city.

=== Pausanias's account ===
In Pausanias, Description of Greece also told a story about Melaneus and his arrival to Messenia:

Some time later, as no descendant of Polycaon survived (in my opinion his house lasted for five generations, but no more), they summoned Perieres, the son of Aeolus, as king. To him, the Messenians say, came Melaneus, a good archer and considered for this reason to be a son of Apollo; Perieres assigned to him as a dwelling a part of the country now called the Carnasium, but which then received the name Oechalia, derived, as they say, from the wife of Melaneus.
