= Agenor (son of Phegeus) =

Ancient Greek mythological figure

In Greek mythology, Agenor (/əˈdʒiːnɔːr/; Ancient Greek: Ἀγήνωρ or Αγήνορι, romanized: Agēnor, lit. 'heroic, manly') was a Psophian prince.

== Family ==
Agenor was the son of Phegeus, king of Psophis, in Arcadia. He was the brother of Pronous and Arsinoe, who was married to, and later abandoned by, the Argive Alcmaeon.

== Mythology ==
When Alcmaeon wanted to give the celebrated necklace and peplos of Harmonia—which had formerly belonged to Arsinoe—to his second wife Calirrhoe, the daughter of Achelous, he was slain by Agenor and Pronous at the instigation of Phegeus. But when the two brothers came to Delphi, where they intended to dedicate the necklace and peplos, they themselves were killed by Amphoterus and Acarnan, the sons of Alcmaeon and Calirrhoe.

Pausanias, who relates the same story, writes that the children of Phegeus were named Temenus, Axion, and Alphesiboea.
