= Agapenor =

Ancient Greek mythological hero involved in the Trojan War

In Greek mythology, Agapenor (Ancient Greek: Ἀγαπήνωρ, gen. Ἀγαπήνορος meaning 'loving manliness', 'manly') was a leader of the Arcadians in the Trojan War. According to the Pausanias's Description of Greece, Agapenor became the king of Arcadia after the death of Echemus. On the return journey from the battle at Troy his ships were wrecked by a storm and stranded on Cyprus, where he founded New Paphos.

== Family ==
=== Ancestors ===
Homer names Ancaeus as the father of Agapenor, a detail repeated in both Apollodorus and Pausanias, the latter of whom adds that Agapenor's grandfather is thus Lycurgus. His mother is given by Hyginus as Iotis. In his commentary on the Alexandra of Lycophron (c. 330–325 BCE), the 12th Century CE Byzantine grammarian John Tzetzes gives Agapenor's father as Ancaeus, who is himself the son of Actor and, according to Tzetzes, Eurythemis (herself the daughter of Acastus), with Tzetzes being the only surviving source for this Eurythemis.

Agapenor's lineage is referenced in the Alexandra of Lycophron, which rarely refers to figures by their names and instead uses cryptic allusions to the deeds or fates of a character to establish their identity. He is described here as 'one of the sons of the oak who took the shape of wolves after they cut Nyktimos to pieces', a reference to Lycaon, who was turned into a wolf by Zeus after attempting to feed him human flesh.

In his commentary on the poem, Tzetzes traces two different genealogies for Agapenor in order to connect him to Lycophron, based on two different possibilities for the identity of the 'sons of the oak'. The first lineage, for which Tzetzes cites Eumelos and Charon of Lampsacus as a sources, is that of Arcas – here described as a son of either Zeus or Apollo – and Callisto, daughter of Lycaon. Tzetzes relates that Arcas rescued a hamadryad – a type oak tree nymph bound to a specific tree – named Chrysopeleia by preventing her tree from being destroyed during a flood, after which she bore him two children, Elatus and Amphidamas. The Arcadians all descend from these two. This is the interpretation also followed by modern commentators such as George Mooney, Simon Hornblower, and Fabian Horn. The second option Tzetzes offers to explain the reference to the sons of oak is that for Agapenor was part of the line of Dryops, listing the parents of Dryops as Apollo and Dia, with Dia being a daughter of Lycaon.

=== Descendants ===
In the other direction, Pausanias states that a descendant of Agapanor, Laodice, sent a robe (peplos) to Tegea, on which there was an epigram dedicating it to Athena Alea, and that she also set up a temple to Paphian Aphrodite – although J. Roy argues that Pausanias's description should be understood to mean that Laodice set up a cult image in a pre-existing temple. This Laodice is mentioned in no other ancient source, and whilst some have interpreted Pausanias's description as meaning that Laodice was the daughter of Agapenor, others have argued the actual phrasing gives no clue as to the exact relationship between the two, and thus she could be a descendant several generations removed from him. Roy points out that the dedication on the peplos, which Pausanias quotes, and which he claimed proved her descent, does not mention Agapenor, but only that Laodice came from Cyprus. Based on this, Roy further argues that at the time of the creation of the epigram, Laodice was not thought of as a descendant of Agapenor.

== Mythology ==
=== The death of Alcmaeon ===
Agapenor plays a minor role in Apollodorus's account of the story of the death of Alcmaeon. Alcmaeon's second wife, Callirrhoe, asked him for the robe and Necklace of Harmonia as gifts – objects which were then in the possession of king Phegus of Psophis, the father of Alcmaeon's first wife, Arsinoe or Alphesiboea. Alcmaeon retrieved the gifts under false pretences, but Phegeus learned the truth of the situation from a servant, and ordered his sons, Pronous and Agenor, to kill Alcmaeon. Arsinoe castigated her brothers for their deed, whereupon they restrained her in a chest, took her to Tagea, and gave her to Agapenor as a slave, having falsely accused her of being Alcmaeon's murderer.

Callirrhoe learned of Alcmaeon's death, and, when Zeus tried to court her, she asked that her sons Amphoterus and Acarnan be fully grown so that they could avenge their father. Zeus granted this request and the sons then set out to avenge their father. They encountered Pronous and Agenor at the house of Agapenor, where they had stopped whilst on their way to Delphi to dedicate the necklace of and robe of Harmonia, and successfully avenged their father.

=== The Trojan War ===
In the Iliad Agapenor appears in the Catalogue of Ships and is listed as king of the Arcadians, who led his Arcadians to Troy with sixty ships which he received from Agamemnon. The expanse of his territory included Pheneos, Orchomenus, Rhipe, Stratia, Enispe, Tegea, Mantineia, Stymphalus and Parrhasia. Apollodorus also list him among the men who fought at Troy, but assigns him only seven ships. He is also listed by Apollodorus and Hyginus among the suitors of Helen, and the fourth Century CE Greek poet Quintus Smyrnaeus lists him as one of the Greeks inside the Trojan Horse. During the Achaean landing at Mysia, the Arcadian ships ran aground, requiring intervention from Achilles and Protesilaus to rescue them. Quintus also mentions Agapenor as the victor of the long jump for the funeral games of Achilles, winning as a prize the armor of Cycnus.

=== Cyprus ===
Though the dating of Lycophron's Alexandra is disputed, it remains the earliest surviving source which associates Agapenor with Cyprus, despite the fact that the cryptic style of the poem means that his name itself does not appear. In the section of the poem which deals with Cassandra's prophecies of the nostoi, or homecomings, of the Greeks after the sack of Troy, she foretells the fates of five of the Greek leaders who are destined to land at, and stay on, Cyprus. The second of these is Agapenor, who will mine copper.

The earliest surviving source who explicitly mentions Agapenor by name is Strabo, who states in the Geographica that Agapenor founded Paphos, but gives no further details. Further accounts from other authors include the details that, on Agapenor's return from Troy he and his fleet was cast by a storm on the coast of Cyprus, where he built the Sanctuary of Aphrodite Paphia at Old Paphos and founded New Paphos.

== Bibliography ==
- Bernabé, Alberto; Olmos, Ricardo (1996). Poetarum epicorum Graecorum testimonia et fragmenta: Pars I (Ed. correctior primae ed.). B.G. Teubner. ISBN 3-8154-1706-6.
- Casevitz, Michel; Jost, Madeleine; Marcadé, Jean (1998). Description de la Grèce: l'Arcadie. Vol. 8. les Belles lettres. ISBN 2-251-00465-3.
- Gantz, Timothy (1993). Early Greek myth: a guide to literary and artistic sources. Johns Hopkins University press. ISBN 0-8018-4410-X.
- Gjerstad, E. (1944). The Colonization of Cyprus in Greek Legend: Opuscula Archaeologica 3. C. W. K. Gleerup.
- Homer (1924). The Iliad. Vol. 1. Translated by Murray, A. T. Harvard University Press.
- Horn, Fabian (2022). Alexandra: Griechisch - deutsch. De Gruyter. ISBN 978-3-11-075469-8.
- Hornblower, Simon (2015). Lykophron: Alexandra. Greek Text, Translation, Commentary, & Introduction (First ed.). Oxford University Press.
- Hyginus (1960). The myths of Hyginus. Translated by Grant, Mary. University of Kansas Press.
- Jacoby, Felix (ed.). die Fragmenta der griechischen Historiker: Teil 3a.
- Mooney, George, ed. (1921). The Alexandra of Lycophron. G. Bell & Sons.
- Pausanias (1918). Description of Greece. Vol. 4. Translated by Jones, W.H.S. Harvard University Press.
- Pirenne-Delforge, V. (1994). L'Aphrodite grecque : contribution à l'étude de ses cultes et de sa personnalité dans le panthéon archaïque et classique. Kernos (supplemént IV). Centre International d'Étude de la Religion Grecque Antique.
- Pseudo-Apollodorus (1921). The Library. Vol. 2. Translated by Frazer, James George. Harvard University Press.
- Quintus Smyrnaeus (1913). The fall of Troy. Translated by Way, Arthur. William Heinemann.
- Roy, J. (1987). "Pausanias, Viii, 5, 2-3 and Viii, 53, 7: Laodice Descendant of Agapenor; Tegea and Cyprus". L'Antiquité Classique. 56: 192–200. ISSN 0770-2817.
- Scheer, Eduard, ed. (1881). Lycophronis Alexandra. Vol. 2. Weidmann.
- Scheer, Tanja S. (2018). "Myth, Memory and the Past : Wandering Heroes between Arcadia and Cyprus". In Audley-Miller, Lucy; Dignas, Beate (eds.). Wandering Myths: transcultural Uses of Myth in the Ancient World. De Gruyter. pp. 71–94.
- Strabo (1924). The Geography of Strabo. Translated by Jones, H. L. Harvard University Press.
- Vanschoonwinkel, Jacques (1991). L'Egée et la méditerranée orientale à la fin du deuxième millénaire: témoignages archéologiques et sources écrites. Département d'archéologie et d'histoire de l'art Collège Erasme.
- Wissowa, Georg; Kroll, Willhelm, eds. (1907). Paulys Realencyclopädie der classischen Altertumswissenschaft: Band 6.1. Metzler.
- Wissowa, Georg, ed. (1894). Paulys Realencyclopädie der classischen Altertumswissenschaft: Band 1.1. Metzler.
