= Phegeus of Psophis =

In Greek mythology, Phegeus (Ancient Greek: Φηγεύς, romanized: Phêgeus, lit. 'oak' or 'pertaining to the beech/ oak tree') was the king of Psophis in Arcadia who purified Alcmaeon after the murder of his own mother, Eriphyle. The town of Phegeia, which had before been called Erymanthus, was believed to have derived its name from him. Subsequently, however, it was changed again into Psophis.

== Family ==
Phegeus was the son of river-god Alpheus. He is said to have been the father of Alphesiboea, Temenus and Axion or of Arsinoe, Pronous and Agenor.

== Mythology ==
When Alcmaeon was pursued by the Erinyes of his mother's murder, and afflicted with madness he left his country and came to Psophis. There Phegeus offered him succor and gave him his daughter Arsinoe or Alphesiboea, who received from Alcmaeon, as a wedding present, the robe and necklace of Harmonia. However, because of his crime, the ground became barren in Psophis and an oracle told Alcmaeon to depart to Achelous and to stand another trial on the river bank. So he went to the springs of Achelous, and was purified by him, receiving river-gods' daughter Callirrhoe to wife. After some time, Callirrhoe told Alcmaeon that she would not live with him if she did not get the robe and necklace of Harmonia, which now were owned by his first wife Arsinoe. Alcmaeon then went to Psophis and told Phegeus that it had been predicted that he should be rid of his madness when he had brought the robe and necklace to Delphi and dedicated them. Phegeus believing him, gave the said jewelry and clothing but a servant disclosed that his son-in-law was taking these belongings to Callirrhoe. So the sons of Phegeus, Pronous and Agenor or Temenus and Axion, following their father's orders, waited for Alcmaeon in an ambush and killed him. According to Hyginus, Phegeus himself killed his own son-in-law and also his granddaughter, the daughter of Alphesiboea.

When Callirrhoe learned that she was a widow she requested of Zeus that the sons she had by Alcmaeon might be full-grown in order to avenge their father's murder. And Zeus, who at the time courted her, granted her wish. So when Pronous and Agenor, carrying the robe and necklace (which they intended to dedicate at Delphi), arrived at the house of Agapenor they met the suddenly grown-up children of Alcmaeon and Callirrhoe, Amphoterus and Acarnan, who happened to arrive at the same time. The sons of Alcmaeon killed on the spot their father's murderers and afterwards going to Psophis they slew both Phegeus and his wife in their palace.
