= Axion (mythology) =

Greek mythological figure

In Greek mythology, Axion (Ancient Greek: Ἀξιόν) was the name of the following two individuals.

- Axion, son of Phegeus of Psophis in Arcadia and brother of Temenus and Alphesiboea. At the command of their father, Axion together with his brother murdered by treachery their brother-in-law Alcmaeon and the two then dedicated the necklace of Harmonia to the god Apollo in Delphi. It is said that when the expedition of the Greeks to Troy took place, Axion and Temenus were the kings in the city that was still called Phegia (former name of Psophis). The people of Psophis assert that the reason why they took no part in the expedition was because their princes had incurred the enmity of the leaders of the Argives, who were in most cases related by blood to Alcmaeon, and had joined him in his campaign against Thebes. Later on, the widowed sister, Alphesiboea killed her own brothers in revenge of her husband's death. Otherwise, Apollodorus calls the two sons of Phegeus, Agenor and Pronous.
- Axion, son of Priam of Troy, who was killed by Eurypylus, son of Euaemon during the Trojan War.
