= Arsinoe (mythology) =

Name of multiple mythological figures

In Greek mythology, Arsinoe, sometimes spelled Arsinoë, (pronounced [arsinóɛː]; Ancient Greek: Ἀρσινόη, romanized: Arsinóē, lit. 'elevated-minded' or 'uplifted intellect') was the name of the following individuals.

- Arsinoe, one of the Nysiads (Dodonides), nurses of the infant Dionysus in Mount Nysa.
- Arsinoe, daughter of Leucippus and possibly Philodice. She was also the sister of Hilaeira and Phoebe, who were abducted by the Dioscuri. By the god Apollo, Arsinoe bore Asclepius, 'leader of men' and Eriopis 'with the lovely hair'. Otherwise, the mother of Asclepius was called Coronis, daughter of Phlegyas because it is said that Asclepius being the son of Arsinoe, was a fiction invented by Hesiod, or by one of Hesiod's interpolators, just to please the Messenians, with Apollo himself admitting that Coronis was the mother of Asclepius. At Sparta she had a sanctuary and was worshipped as a heroine.
- Arsinoe, one of the Minyades, according to Plutarch. These daughter of Minyas were struck with madness and having conceived a greedy appetite for man's flesh, cast lots accordingly for their children to see who they were going to eat. Whereupon it fell to Leucippe's lot to produce her son Hippasus to be cut in pieces.
- Arsinoe or Alphesiboea, daughter of Phegeus, king of Psophis in Arcadia and sister of Pronous and Agenor. She was the wife of Alcmaeon, leader of the Epigoni by whom she bore a son, Clytius. After Alcmaeon was purified from blood guilt by Phegeus for murdering his own mother Eriphyle, Arsinoe was given in marriage to the hero who received from him the necklace of Harmonia. Later on, her brothers, Pronous and Agenor killed Alcmaeon at the instigation of their father. When Arsinoe condemned them of the act, they clapped her into a chest and carried her to Tegea. There they gave her as a slave to Agapenor, falsely accusing her of her husband's murder. Eventually, retribution came when the sons of Alcmaeon, Amphoterus and Acarnan slew their father's murderers and also Phegeus and his wife.
- Arsinoe, nurse of Orestes who saved him from the hands of his mother Clytemnestra, and carried him to the aged Strophius, the father of Pylades. Other traditions called this nurse Laodameia.
- Arsinoe, daughter of King Nicocreon of Salamis in Cyprus. Arceophon wooed her, but he was rejected, so he killed himself in despair. When Arsinoe leaned out of the window to take a look at the funeral ceremony, Aphrodite turned her into stone.
