= Acarnan =

In Greek mythology, the name of these two characters

In Greek mythology, Acarnan (Ancient Greek: Ἀκαρνάν; genitive Ἀκαρνᾶνος derived from ἀκαρνάν, akarnan, related to ἀχαρνώς, acharnōs, meaning a sea fish, possibly bass) was the name of these two characters:

- Acarnan, son of Alcmaeon and Callirrhoe.
- Acarnan, one of the Suitors of Penelope who came from Dulichium along with either 56 other wooers (according to Apollodorus), or 51 (according to Homer). He, with the other suitors, was slain by Odysseus with the aid of Eumaeus, Philoetius, and Telemachus.
