= Temenus (mythology) =

In Greek mythology, Temenus (Ancient Greek:Τήμενος Tēmenos) was the name attributed to the following personages:

- Temenus, a son of Pelasgus, who reared Hera at Stymphalus in Arcadia. His mother was probably either Meliboea, an Oceanid or Oread, one of the nymphs. Temenus established three sanctuaries for the goddess Hera. He gave her three surnames: (1) when she was still a maiden, Girl; (2) when married to Zeus he called her Grown-up; (3) when for some cause or other she quarreled with Zeus and came back to Stymphalus, he named her Widow.
- Temenus, son of Phegeus of Psophis in Arcadia and brother of Axion and Alphesiboea. At the command of their father, Temenus together with his brother murdered by treachery their brother-in-law Alcmaeon and the two then dedicated the necklace of Harmonia to the god Apollo in Delphi. It is said that when the expedition of the Greeks to Troy took place, Temenus and Axion were the kings in the city that was still called Phegia (former name of Psophis). The people of Psophis assert that the reason why they took no part in the expedition was because their princes had incurred the enmity of the leaders of the Argives, who were in most cases related by blood to Alcmaeon, and had joined him in his campaign against Thebes. Later on, the widowed sister, Alphesiboea killed her own brothers in revenge of her husband's death. Otherwise, Apollodorus calls the two sons of Phegeus, Agenor and Pronous.
- Temenus, son of Aristomachus, and father of Archelaus. Temenus was one of the Heraclidae.
