= Alcmaeon =

Alcmaeon, Alkmaion, Alcmeon, or Alkmaon may refer to:

- Alcmaeon, the great-grandson of Nestor, from whom the Alcmaeonidae claimed descent
- Alcmaeon (mythology), one of the Epigoni
- Alcmaeon in Corinth, a lost play by Euripides
- Alcmaeon in Psophis, a lost play by Euripides
- Alcmaeon (King of Athens), the last king of Athens
- Alcmaeon, son of Megacles, 6th century BC commander during the Cirrhaean War
- Alcmaeon of Croton (mid-fifth century B.C.), an Ancient Greek philosopher and medical theorist
