= Alcmaeon in Psophis =

Lost tragedy written by Euripides

- Original language: Ancient Greek
- Written by: Euripides
- Chorus: Young women
- Characters: Alcmaeon; Phegeus of Psophis; Alphesiboea ? Others?
- Genre: Tragedy
- Setting: Psophis

Premiere
- Date: 438 BC
- Place: Athens

Alcmaeon in Psophis (Ancient Greek: Ἀλκμαίων ὁ διὰ Ψωφῖδος, romanized: Alkmaíōn ho dià Psōphídos) is a play by Athenian playwright Euripides. The play has been lost except for a few surviving fragments. It was first produced in 438 BCE in a tetralogy that also included the extant Alcestis and the lost Cretan Women and Telephus. The story is believed to have incorporated the death of Argive hero Alcmaeon.
