= Tropaea =

Tropaea or Tropaia (Ancient Greek: Τρόπαιά) was a town of ancient Arcadia, in the district Psophidia, on the Ladon. Its site is unlocated.
