= Pronous (mythology) =

Figure in Greek mythology

In Greek mythology, Pronous (Ancient Greek: Πρόνοος, romanized: Pronoos) was the name of the following characters:

- Pronoos, the Locrian son of Deucalion and Pyrrha, the legendary progenitors of the Greek race. He was the brother of Orestheus and Marathonios. In one source, Pronous was named as the father of Hellen.
- Pronous, son of Phegeus, king of Psophis. Along with his brother Agenor he killed Alcmaeon (counted among the Epigoni), following his father's instructions. These brothers were thereafter killed by the sons of Alcmaeon (Amphoterus and Acarnan), or perhaps by their own sister Arsinoe, wife of Alcmaeon. Otherwise, Pausanias calls the two sons of Phegeus, Axion and Temenus, and their sister Alphesiboea.
- Pronous, one of the Trojans. He was killed by Patroclus during the Trojan War.
- Pronous, one of the Suitors of Penelope from Ithaca along with 11 other wooers. He, with the other suitors, was killed by Odysseus with the assistance of Eumaeus, Philoetius, and Telemachus.
