= Phyle Cave =

Cave in Greece

- Location within Greece
- 38°8′46″N 23°40′6″E
- Type: Sanctuary
- Periods: Mycenean Greece, Classical Greece to Roman Empire
- Location: Fyli, Attica, Greece

The Phyle Cave is a small cave on Mount Parnes near Fyli (Phyle), a suburb of Athens in Attica, Greece. In ancient Greece it was the site of a sanctuary to Pan and the nymphs. It is also known as Lychnospilia (Λυχνοσπηλιά), meaning lamp cave, for the large number of oil lamps found in the cave. It has been identified as the cave which occurs in the Dyskolos of Menander. The cave was excavated in 1901. Three votive reliefs found in the cave are now on display in the National Archaeological Museum of Athens.

Because of its use for the veneration of Pan the cave is also called the Cave of Pan (Πάνειο άντρο). It was one of the five caves of Pan in the vicinity of ancient Athens.

== Description ==
In Attica most cave shrines dedicated to Pan and the nymphs featured a common type of votive relief. These show three females led by Hermes, often accompanied by Pan and Achelous (for his association with water), within a rocky framework simulating a cave entrance. The female figures are often identified as nymphs or sometimes more specifically the Charites. These reliefs were also found in the Phyle Cave and are now exhibited in the National Archaeological Museum of Athens as inventory numbers 1448, 1859 and 1879.

Number 1879 is particularly complex and interesting. The relief shows a mountain god, Pan, a satyr playing the syrinx and Achelous with a cornucopia. They surround the familiar group of three females near a basin fed by a lion-head waterspout. The waterspout is pierced so that it could supply the water for the actual basin in the cave itself. Various dates have been proposed for the relief ranging from the middle of the fourth century BC to the first century BC, with the later Hellenistic date being more likely.

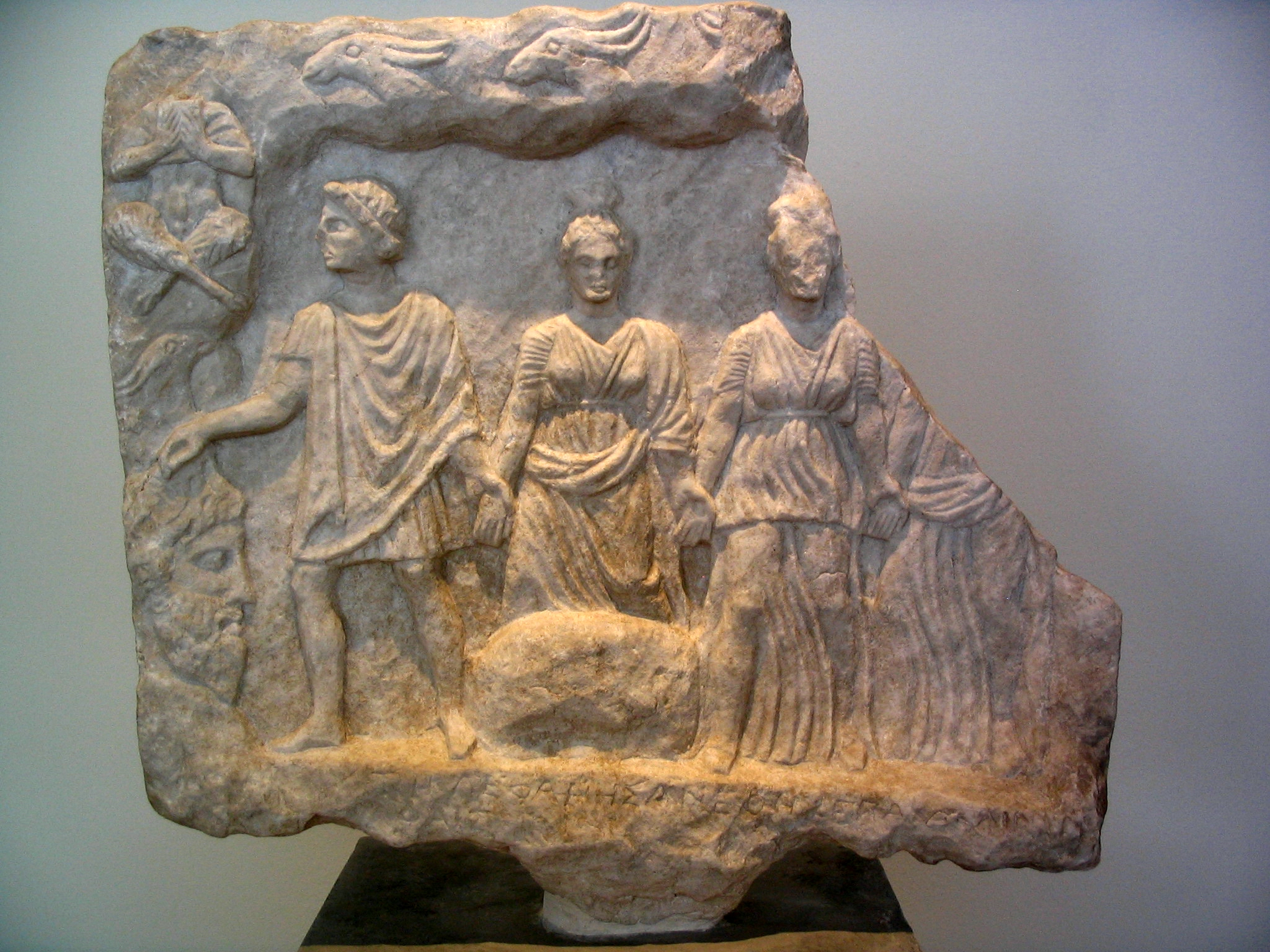
Votive relief number 1448

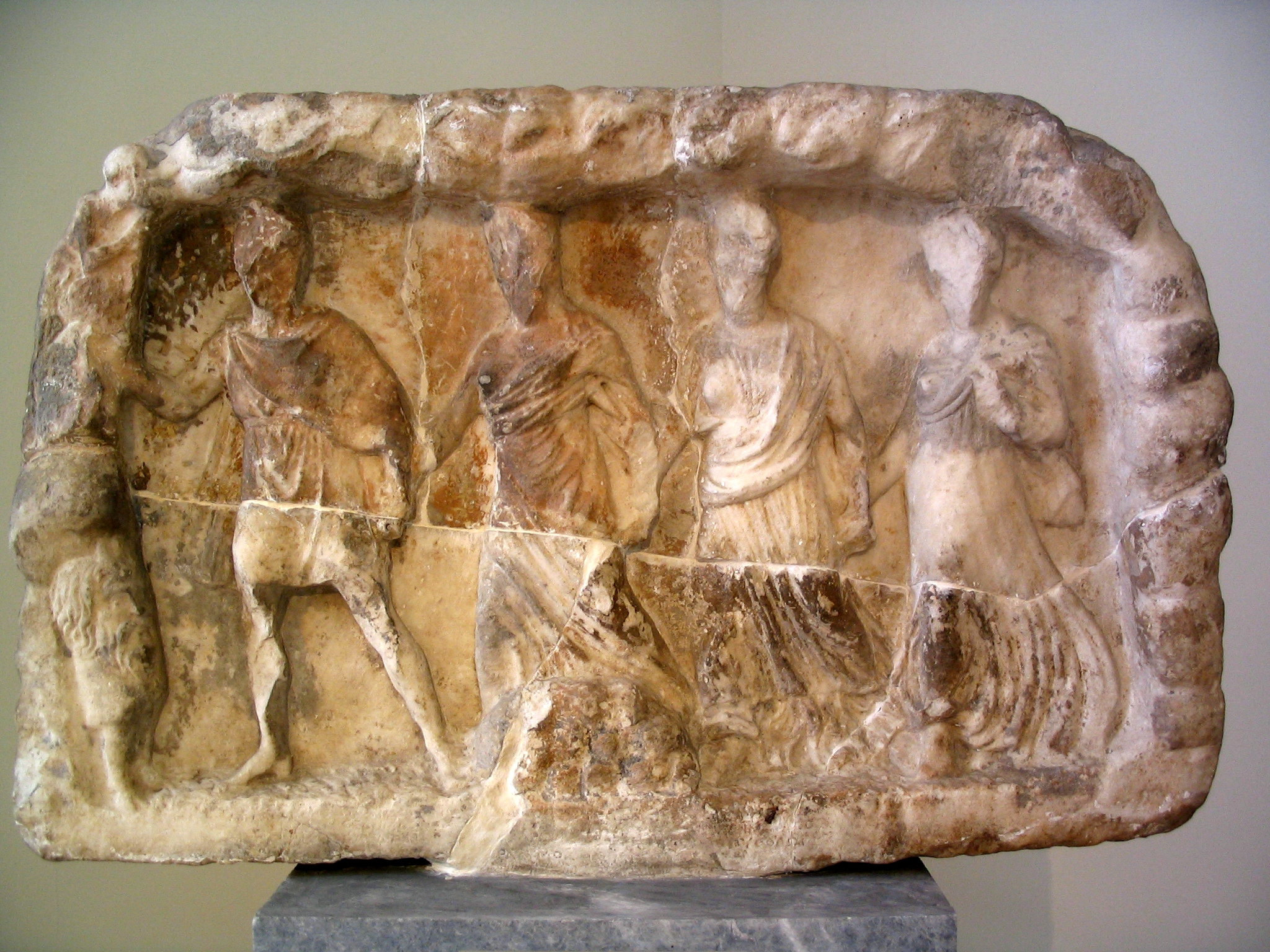
Votive relief number 1859
