= Harmonia =

Ancient Greek goddess of harmony and concord

- Goddess of harmony and concord
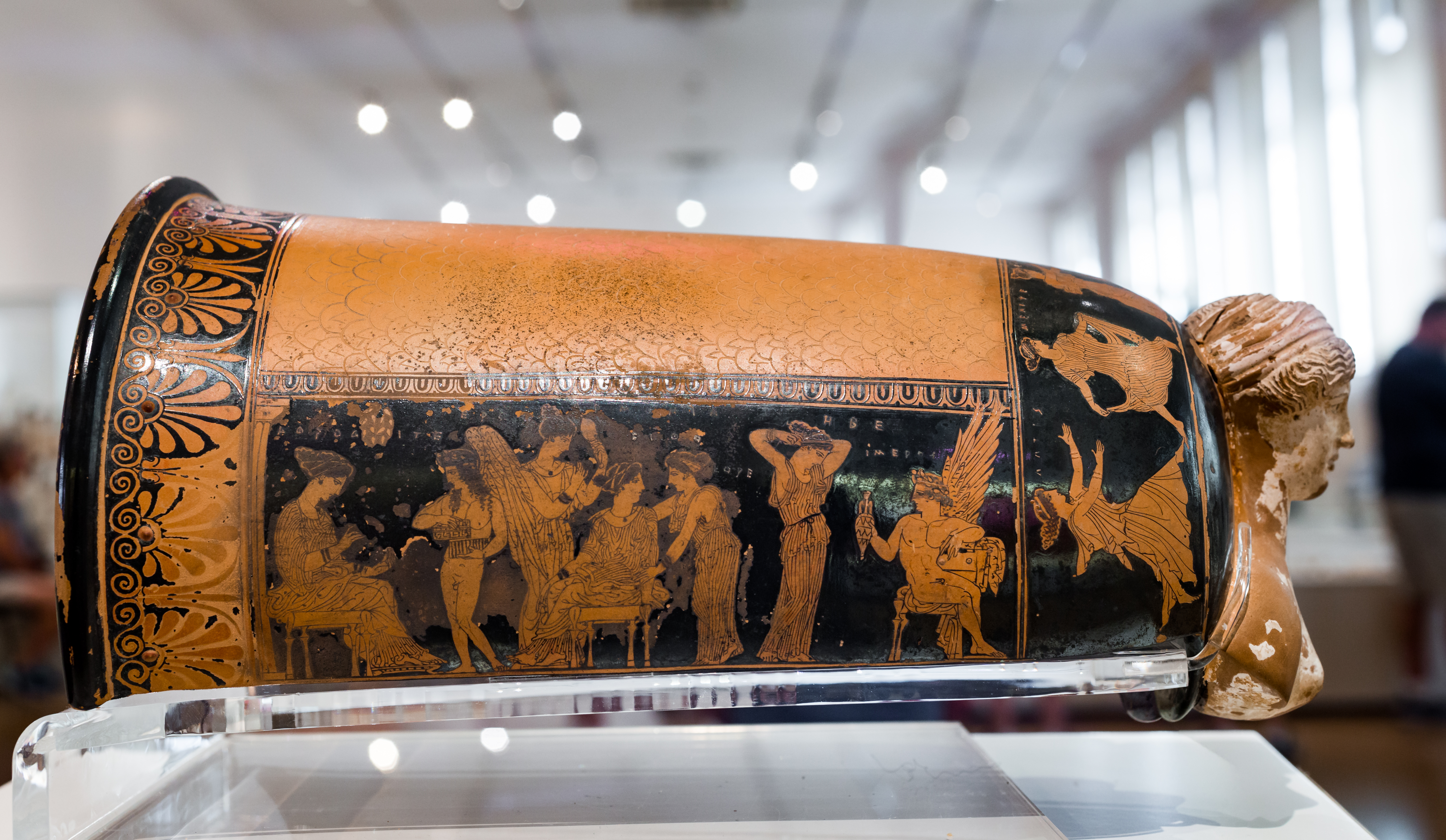
- Harmonia (holding a mirror) with Eros, Peitho, and other deities during preparations for her wedding on an Attic red-figure epinetron from Eretria c. 430-420 BC, National Archaeological Museum of Greece.
- Abode: Thebes, Illyria

Genealogy
- Parents: Ares and Aphrodite or Zeus and Electra
- Spouse: Cadmus
- Children: Autonoë, Agave, Illyrius, Ino, Semele, and Polydorus

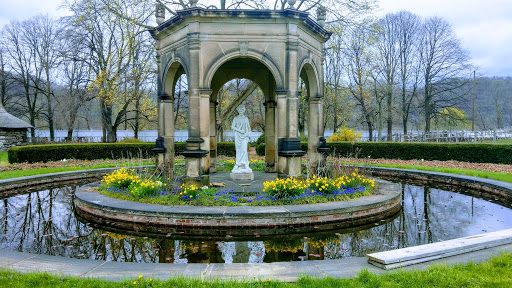
Statue of Harmonia in the Harmony Society gardens in Old Economy Village, Pennsylvania.

In Greek mythology, Harmonia (/hɑːrˈmoʊniə/; Ancient Greek: Ἁρμονία, romanized: Harmonía, lit. 'harmony' pronounced [harmoˈnia]) is the goddess of harmony and concord. She is traditionally the daughter of Aphrodite, the goddess of love, and Ares, the god of war.

Harmonia is most well-known for her marriage to Cadmus and the many misfortunes that haunted her descendants, particularly those related to the fabled Necklace of Harmonia. By her husband she became the mother of Autonoë, Agave, Ino, Semele, and Polydorus, and is thus the grandmother of Dionysus.

== Name and etymology ==
The theonym Harmonia derives from the Greek noun harmoníā (ἁρμονία), meaning 'means of joining, frame, covenant, agreement'. The word comes from an adjective preserved only as a personal name, Harmōn (Ἁρμων). It is derived from the prefix ar- (ἀρ- < PIE *h₂er- 'to fit'), combined with the suffix -men-.

== Family ==
Harmonia's parentage varies between accounts. She has most often been named as a daughter of the gods Ares and Aphrodite. This would make her the sister of other mythological figures such as Aeneas, Phobos, and Eros. In other accounts, Harmonia was born in Samothrace to Zeus and the Pleiad Electra. In this telling, Harmonia would have been the sister of Dardanus and Iasion, who, under the instruction of Zeus, were the founders of mystic rites on Samothrace.

In nearly all of her mythological accounts, Harmonia is married to Cadmus, the legendary hero and founder of Thebes. With Cadmus, she was the mother of Ino, Polydorus, Autonoë, Agave, Semele, and, in some accounts, Illyrius. Through her daughter Semele, Harmonia was the grandmother of Dionysus.

== Mythology ==
Mythological narratives surrounding Harmonia are deeply intertwined with those of her husband, Cadmus. Harmonia is commonly acquired by Cadmus as his bride in two different ways. In the version of the myth where Harmonia was born to Zeus and Electra on Samothrace, she was either given to Cadmus or carried off by him after he was initiated into the island's mysteries. In the version of the myth where she is the daughter of Aphrodite and Ares, Zeus gifted her to Cadmus upon his founding of Thebes and the completion of his eight-year servitude to Ares after he slew a dragon sacred to the god.

The wedding of Harmonia and Cadmus was attended by all the gods. Many gifts were lavished upon the couple, most notably a peplos and a necklace (ὅρμος) wrought by Hephaestus. Common versions of the myth claim that Hephaestus created the necklace because he was angered by his wife, Aphrodite's, affair with Ares, and vowed to curse any children born of the union. Other traditions claim that the necklace and peplos were instead gifted by Athena, Aphrodite, or Cadmus's sister Europa, who had received them as a gift from Zeus. The necklace, commonly referred to as the Necklace of Harmonia or the Necklace of Eriphyle, was famed for bringing misfortune upon all those who wore it. This misfortune primarily fell upon queens and princesses of Thebes. Although no undisputed description of the Necklace exists, it is usually described in ancient Greek passages as being of beautifully wrought gold and inlaid with various jewels, typically emeralds.

Hyginus gives another version of the story. According to him, the thing which brought ill fate to the descendants of Harmonia was not a necklace, but the peplos "dipped in crime", given to Harmonia by Hephaestus and Hera.

When Cadmus was expelled from Thebes, Harmonia accompanied him. The pair went to Illyria to fight on the side of the Enchelii, and conquered the enemy. Cadmus then became king of the Illyrians. However, he was turned into a serpent soon afterwards. His transformation may have been related to the ill fortune which clung to him as a result of his having killed the sacred dragon; one day he remarked that if the gods were so enamored of the life of a serpent, he might as well wish that life for himself. Immediately he began to grow scales and change in form. Harmonia, seeing the transformation, stripped herself and begged the gods to share her husband's fate. As she was embraced by the serpent Cadmus in a pool of wine, the gods took pity, granted her request, and transformed her. The couple was sent to Elysium.

Harmonia was closely associated with Aphrodite Pandemos, an aspect of Aphrodite that personified order and civic unity.

=== The cursed necklace ===
All of Harmonia and Cadmus's children experienced great misfortune. Through Agave's son Pentheus, the necklace came into the possession of Jocasta, wife and mother of Oedipus, who committed suicide upon the discovery of his identity. Their son Polynices then inherited the necklace and peplos. He used both items to bribe Eriphyle so that she would persuade her husband, Amphiaraus, and her sons, Alcmaeon and Amphilochus, to participate in the Seven against Thebes expedition. The expedition was a failure and Amphiaraus died during the battle. To avenge his father, Alcmaeon killed Eriphyle and the necklace and peplos came into his possession. He gifted it to his first wife, Alphesiboea, a daughter of Phegus, king of Psophis. When Alcmaeon attempted to take the items back from his wife, he was killed by Phegus's sons, Pronous and Agenor, and they took the necklace. Alcmeon's sons Amphoterus and Acarnan then avenged their father by killing Phegus's sons, and dedicated the necklace to the temple of Athena in Delphi. It was later stolen by the Phocian general Phayllus, who gave it to his mistress. She wore it for a time, but at last her youngest son was seized with madness, and set fire to the house, in which she perished with all her treasures.

== See also ==
- Aneris
- Cadmus et Hermione
- Eris
- Homonoia, goddess of concord, unanimity, and oneness of mind
