= Aglaus =

Ancient Greek citizen

- Died: Arcadia, Greece
- Known for: Mythological poor citizen who was believed to be content & happy by the gods

Aglaus (Ancient Greek: Ἀγλαός) was a semi-mythological poor citizen of Psophis in Arcadia. When King Gyges, king of Lydia asked the Delphic oracle whether any man was happier than he was, the oracle pronounced Aglaus to be happier on account of his contentedness. Pausanias places Aglaus in the time of Croesus.
