= Callirhoe (daughter of Achelous) =

Mythological figure

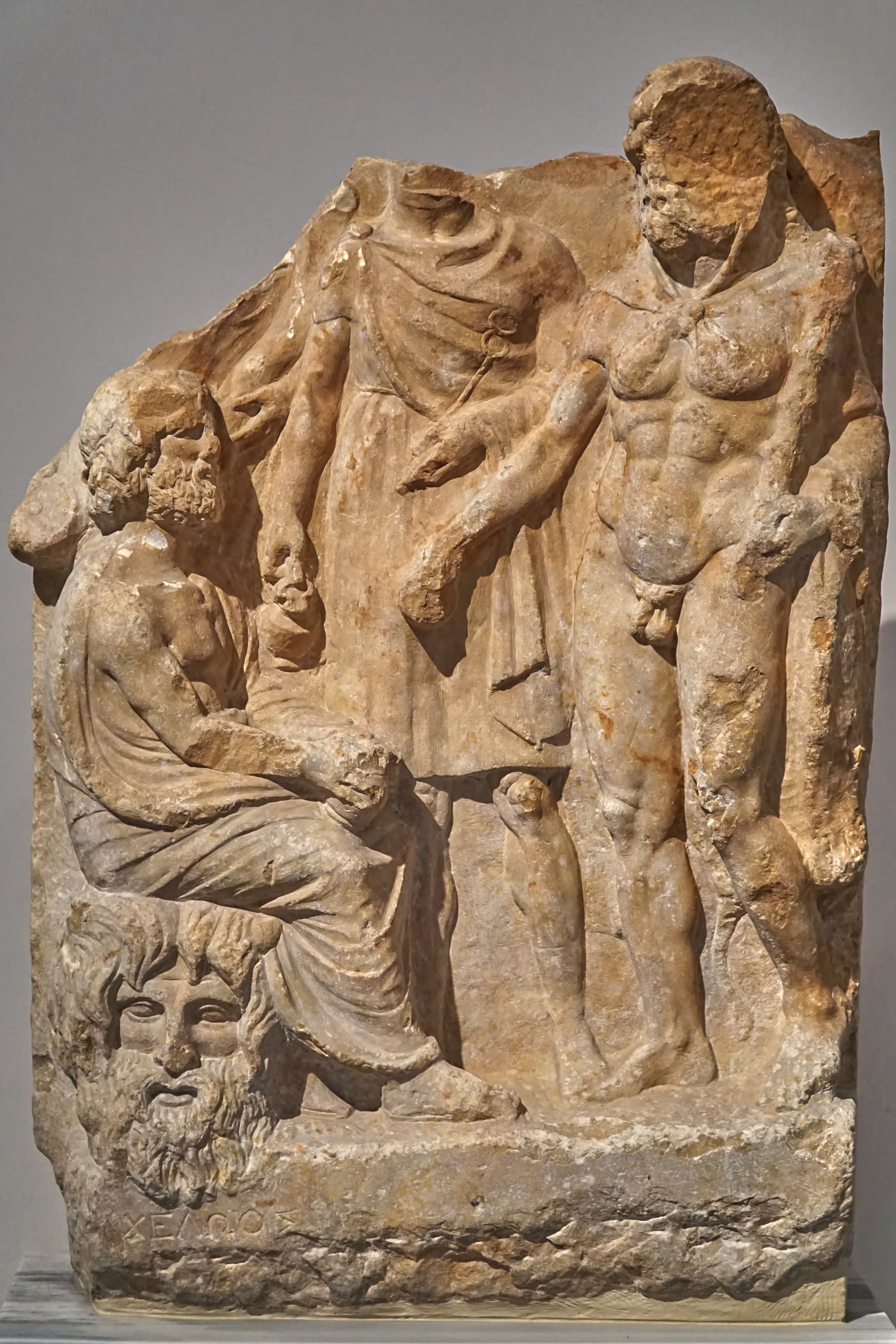
A votive relief depicting a poorly preserved female figure, perhaps Callirhoe, in the presence of Zeus, Hermes, Heracles and Achelous.

In Greek mythology, Callirhoe, Callirrhoe, or Callirrhoë (/kəˈlɪroʊiː/; Ancient Greek: Καλλιρρόη, romanized: Kallirróē, lit. 'beautiful flow') was the daughter of the river god Achelous. She was betrothed of Alcmaeon, son of Amphiaraus of Argos, and mothered by him two sons, Amphoterus and Acarnan.

== Mythology ==
Because of Callirhoe's senseless passion for the robe and necklace of Harmonia, Alcmaeon trying to get them was killed. She then requested of Zeus that her small sons Amphoterus and Acarnan might immediately grow up in order to avenge their father's murder by the hands of king Phegeus' sons.

The following passage recounts the story of Callirhoe as it relates to the fate of Alcmaeon and her children by him.

=== Apollodorus' account ===
But Alcmaeon was visited by the Fury of his mother's murder [Eriphyle], and going mad he first repaired to Oicles in Arcadia, and thence to Phegeus at Psophis. And having been purified by him he married Arsinoe, daughter of Phegeus, and gave her the necklace and the robe [i.e. of Harmonia]. But afterwards the ground became barren on his account, and the god bade him in an oracle to depart to Achelous and to stand another trial on the river bank.

At first he repaired to Oeneus at Calydon and was entertained by him; then he went to the Thesprotians, but was driven away from the country; and finally he went to the springs of Achelous, and was purified by him, and received Callirhoe, his daughter, to wife. Moreover he colonized the land which the Achelous had formed by its silt, and he took up his abode there.

But afterwards Callirhoe coveted the necklace and robe, and said she would not live with him if she did not get them. So away Alcmaeon hied to Psophis and told Phegeus how it had been predicted that he should be rid of his madness when he had brought the necklace and the robe to Delphi and dedicated them. Phegeus believed him and gave them to him.

But a servant having let out that he was taking the things to Callirhoe, Phegeus commanded his sons, and they lay in wait and killed him. When Arsinoe upbraided them, the sons of Phegeus clapped her into a chest and carried her to Tegea and gave her as a slave to Agapenor, falsely accusing her of Alcmaeon's murder.

Being apprized of Alcmaeon's untimely end and courted by Zeus, Callirhoe requested that the sons she had by Alcmaeon might be full grown in order to avenge their father's murder. And being suddenly full-grown, the sons went forth to right their father's wrong.

Now Pronous and Agenor, the sons of Phegeus, carrying the necklace and robe to Delphi to dedicate them, turned in at the house of Agapenor at the same time as Amphoterus and Acarnan, the sons of Alcmaeon; and the sons of Alcmaeon killed their father's murderers, and going to Psophis and entering the palace they slew both Phegeus and his wife. They were pursued as far as Tegea, but saved by the intervention of the Tegeans and some Argives, and the Psophidians took to flight. Having acquainted their mother with these things, they went to Delphi and dedicated the necklace and robe according to the injunction of Achelous. Then they journeyed to Epirus, collected settlers, and colonized Acarnania.

=== Pausanias' account ===
Alcmaeon, after killing his mother [Eriphyle], fled from Argos and came to Psophis, which was still called Phegia after Phegeus, and married Alphesiboea, the daughter of Phegeus. Among the presents that he naturally gave her was the necklace. While he lived among the Arcadians his disease did not grow any better, so he had recourse to the oracle at Delphi. The Pythian priestess informed him that the only land into which the avenging spirit of Eriphyle would not follow him was the newest land, one brought up to light by the sea after the pollution of his mother's death.

On discovering the alluvial deposit of the Achelous he settled there, and took to wife Callirhoe, said by the Acarnanians to have been the daughter of Achelous. He had two sons, Acarnan and Amphoterus; after this Acarnan were called by their present name (so the story runs) the dwellers in this part of the mainland, who previously were called Curetes. Senseless passions shipwreck many men, and even more women.

Callirhoe conceived a passion for the necklace of Eriphyle, and for this reason sent Alcmaeon against his will to Phegia. Temenus and Axion, the sons of Phegeus, murdered him by treachery. The sons of Phegeus are said to have dedicated the necklace to the god in Delphi, and it is said that the expedition of the Greeks to Troy took place when they were kings in the city that was still called Phegia. The people of Psophis assert that the reason why they took no part in the expedition was because their princes had incurred the enmity of the leaders of the Argives, who were in most cases related by blood to Alcmaeon, and had joined him in his campaign against Thebes.

=== Ovid's account ===
And all the while that Iole told this, tearful in sorrow for her sister's fate, Alcmena weeping, tried to comfort her. But as they wept together, suddenly a wonderful event astonished them; for, standing in the doorway, they beheld the old man Iolaus, known to them, but now transformed from age to youth, he seemed almost a boy, with light down on his cheeks for Juno's daughter Hebe, had renewed his years to please her husband, Hercules. Just at the time when ready to make oath, she would not grant such gifts to other men—Themis had happily prevented her. 'For even now,' she said, 'a civil strife is almost ready to break forth in Thebes, and Capaneus shall be invincible to all save the strong hand of Jove himself; and there two hostile brothers shall engage in bloody conflict; and Amphiaraus shall see his own ghost, deep in yawning earth. His own son, dutiful to him, shall be both just and unjust in a single deed; for he, in vengeance for his father's death, shall slay his mother, and confounded lose both home and reason, — persecuted both by the grim Furies and the awful ghost of his own murdered mother; this until his wife, deluded, shall request of him the fatal golden necklace, and until the sword of Phegeus drains his kinsman's blood. And then at last his wife Callirhoe shall supplicate the mighty Jupiter to grant her infant sons the added years of youthful manhood. Then shall Jupiter let Hebe, guardian of ungathered days, grant from the future to Callirhoe's sons, the strength of manhood in their infancy. Do not let their victorious father's death be unavenged a long while. Jove prevailed upon, will claim beforehand all the gifts of Hebe, who is his known daughter-in-law, and his step-daughter, and with one act change Callirhoe's beardless boys to men of size.' When Themis, prophesying future days, had said these words, the Gods of Heaven complained because they also could not grant the gift of youth to many others in this way. Aurora wept because her husband had white hair; and Ceres then bewailed the age of her Iasion, grey and stricken old; and Mulciber demanded with new life his Erichthonius might again appear; and Venus, thinking upon future days, said old Anchises' years must be restored. And every god preferred some favorite, until vexed with the clamor, Jupiter implored, 'If you can have regard for me, consider the strange blessings you desire: does any one of you believe he can prevail against the settled will of Fate? As Iolaus has returned by fate, to those years spent by him; so by the Fates Callirhoe's sons from infancy must grow to manhood with no struggle on their part, or force of their ambition. And you should endure your fortune with contented minds: I, also, must give all control to Fate. If I had power to change the course of Fate I would not let advancing age break down my own son Aeacus, nor bend his back with weight of year; and Rhadamanthus should retain an everlasting flower of youth, together with my own son Minos, who is now despised because of his great age, so that his scepter has lost dignity.
