= Acarnan (son of Alcmaeon) =

In Greek mythology, son of Alcmaeon and Callirrhoe

In Greek mythology, Acarnan (Ancient Greek: Ἀκαρνάν, gen. Ἀκαρνᾶνος, romanized: Akarnan) was son of Alcmaeon and Callirrhoe, and brother of Amphoterus.

== Mythology ==
Arcanan's father Alcmaeon was murdered by Phegeus (or, in some sources, by the latter’s sons — Agenor and Pronous), when Arcanan and his brother Amphoterus were yet very young. Calirrhoe prayed to Zeus to make her sons grow quickly, that they might be able to avenge the death of their father. The prayer was granted, and Acarnan with his brother slew Phegeus, his wife, and his two sons. The inhabitants of Psophis, where the sons had been slain, pursued the murderers as far as Tegea, where however they were received and rescued. At the request of Achelous they carried the necklace and peplos of Harmonia to Delphi, and from thence they went to Epirus, where Acarnan founded the state called after him Acarnania.

In Apollodorus' Bibliotheca, Book III.7.5-7 recounts the adventure of Acarnan and his brother Amphoterus to avenge their father Alcmaeon:

Being apprized of Alcmaeon's untimely end and courted by Zeus, Callirrhoe requested that the sons she had by Alcmaeon might be full grown in order to avenge their father's murder. And being suddenly full-grown, the sons went forth to right their father's wrong. Now Pronous and Agenor, the sons of Phegeus, carrying the necklace and robe to Delphi to dedicate them, turned in at the house of Agapenor at the same time as Amphoterus and Acarnan, the sons of Alcmaeon; and the sons of Alcmaeon killed their father's murderers, and going to Psophis and entering the palace they slew both Phegeus and his wife. They were pursued as far as Tegea, but saved by the intervention of the Tegeans and some Argives, and the Psophidians took to flight. Having acquainted their mother with these things, they went to Delphi and dedicated the necklace and robe according to the injunction of Achelous. Then they journeyed to Epirus, collected settlers, and colonized Acarnania.
