= Amphoterus (son of Alcmaeon) =

Ancient Greek mythological figure

In Greek mythology, Amphoterus (Ancient Greek: Ἀμφότερος, romanized: Amphoteros, lit. 'each of two' or 'both') was the son of Alcmaeon by Callirrhoe (daughter of the river god Achelous), and brother of Acarnan.

== Mythology ==
Amphoterus, just like his brother, suddenly became grown-up in order to avenge his father. The sons of Phegeus, who had killed Alcmaeon, were carrying the necklace of Harmonia to Delphi to dedicate it, and came to the house of Agapenor at the same time as Amphoterus and his brother Acarnan. These, then, killed their father's murderers, and going to Psophis and entering the palace they slew both king Phegeus and his wife.
