= Achelous =

Ancient Greek river god

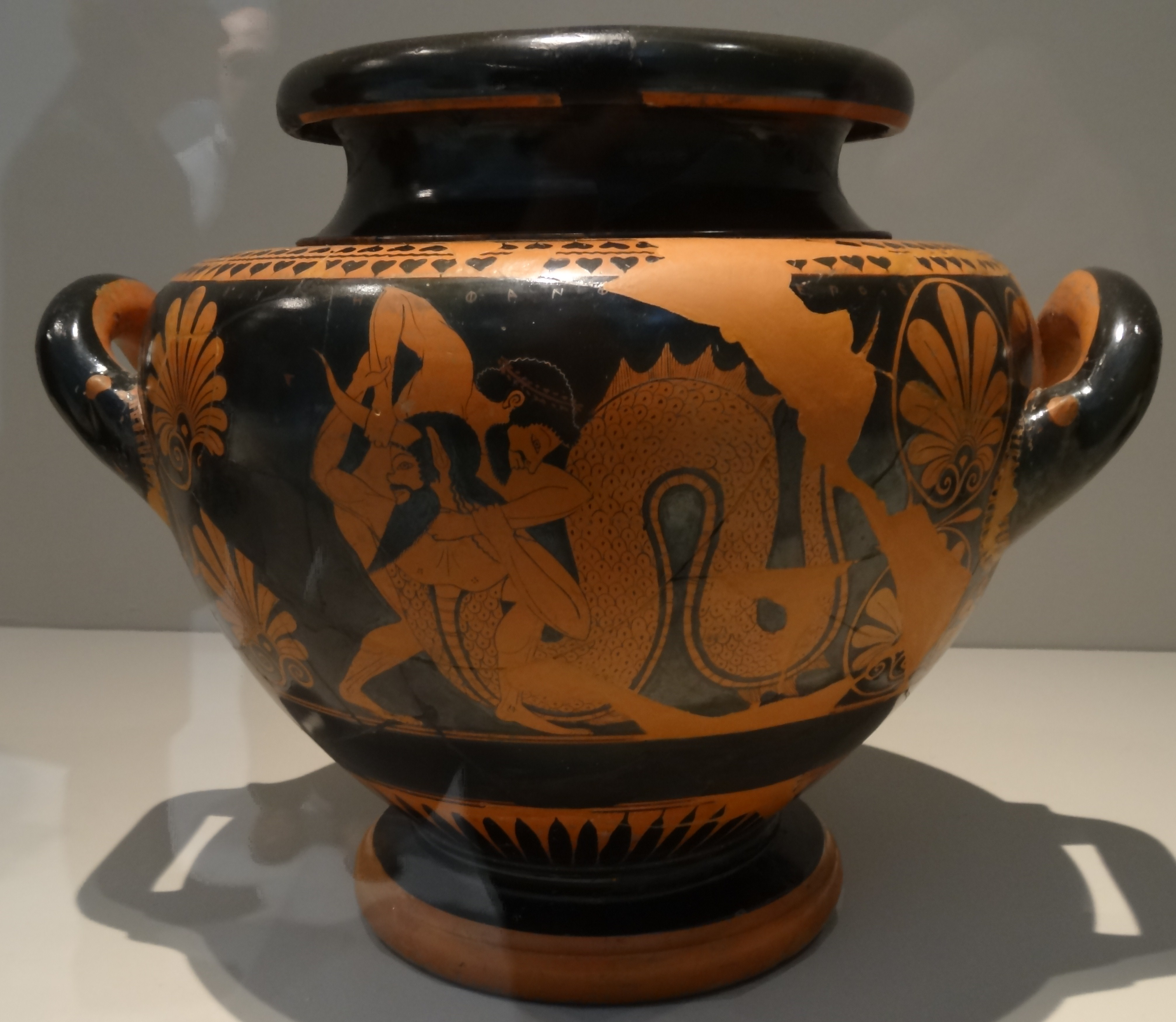
Heracles wrestling with Achelous; Stamnos attributed to Oltos, c. 525–475 BC, London, British Museum E437.

Achelous (also Acheloos or Acheloios) (/ˌækɪˈloʊ.əs/; Ancient Greek: Ἀχελώϊος, and later Ἀχελῷος, Akhelôios) was the god in ancient Greek religion and mythology associated with the Achelous River, the largest river in Greece. According to Hesiod, he was the son of the Titans Oceanus and Tethys. He was also said to be the father of the Sirens, several nymphs, and other offspring.

Achelous was able to change his shape, and in the form of a bull, he wrestled Heracles for the right to marry Deianeira, but lost. He was also involved in the legend of the Argive hero Alcmaeon.

== Etymology ==
The name Ἀχελώϊος is possibly pre-Greek; its meaning is not entirely certain. Recent arguments suggest it is Semitic in origin, with the initial Αχ- stemming from the Akkadian aḫu ("bank of the river"), or aḫû ("seashore") and the suffix -ελώἴος, from the Akkadian illu ("watercourse" or "water of the river invading land"). According to linguist Ivan Duridanov, the Thracian river name Achelōos (alternatively, Achēlon and Achelon), located near Anchialo, in the Black Sea, is cognate to the Greek word, both deriving from a Proto-Indo-European stem *ɘku̯el, meaning 'water'.

== Family ==
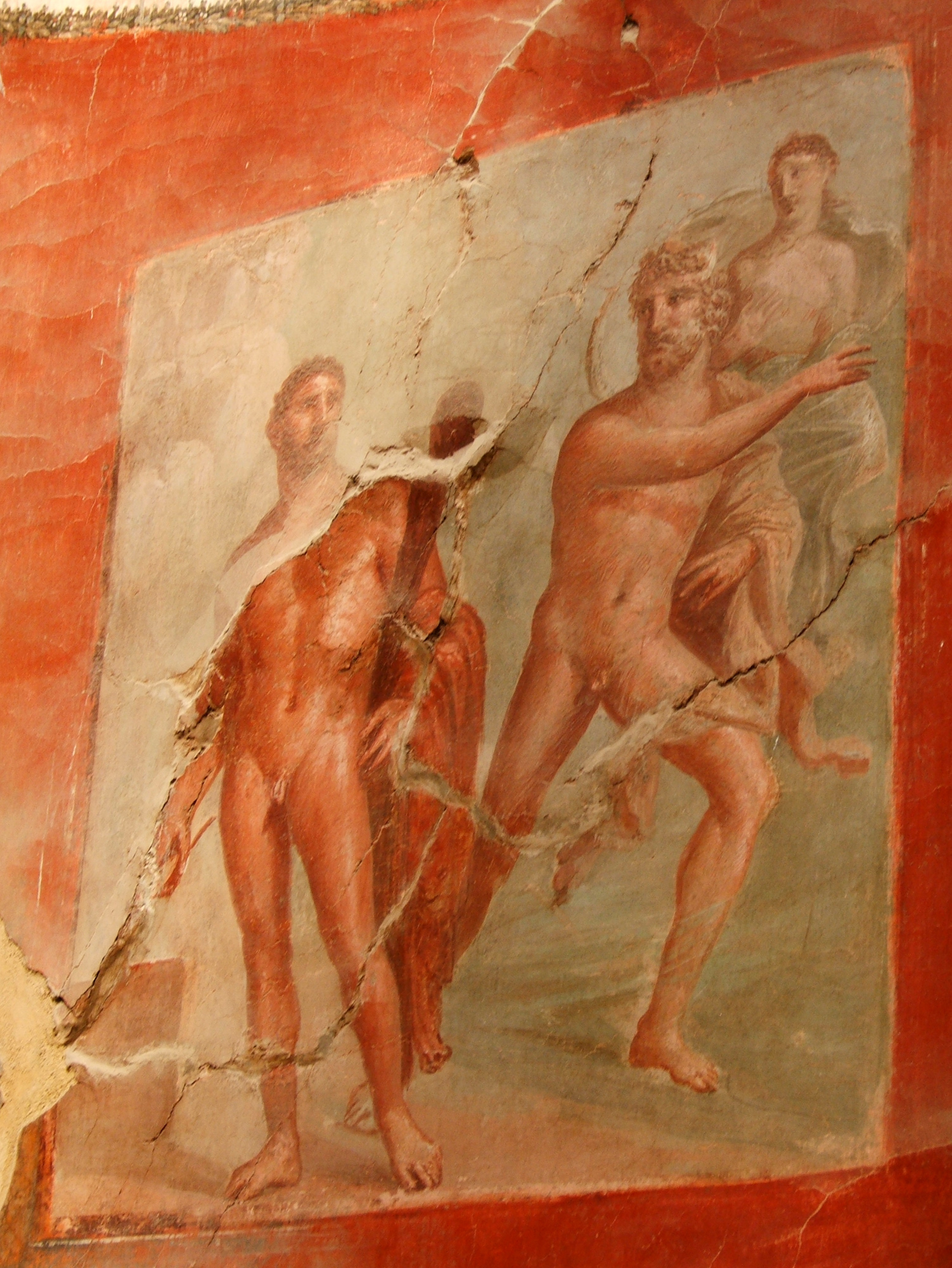
Hercules and Achelous in a Roman wall painting from the Hall of the Augustales.

According to Hesiod, Achelous, along with all the other river gods, was the son of the Titans Oceanus and Tethys. According to the sixth-century mythographer Acusilaus, Achelous was the "oldest and most honoured" of the river-god offspring of Oceanus. Servius, relating a tradition of unknown origin, reports that Achelous was said to have been the son of Earth (i.e. Gaia).

Achelous had various offspring. He was said to be the father of the Sirens. According to the 3rd-century BC poet Lycophron, the Sirens were the daughters of Achelous, by an unnamed "melodious mother" (perhaps meaning the mother was a Muse), while Ovid calls the Sirens simply daughters of Achelous, with no mention of their mother. Another 3rd-century BC, poet Apollonius of Rhodes, makes the mother the Muse Terpsichore, while according to other accounts, she was the Muse Melpomene, or the Calydonian princess Sterope. By Perimede, the daughter of Aeolus, Achelous was said to have fathered Hippodamas and Orestes.

Achelous was also said to be the father (with no mothers mentioned) of several nymphs associated with various famous springs. These included Pirene, the nymph of a spring at Corinth, Castalia, the nymph of a spring at Delphi, and Dirce, the nymph of a spring (and the stream that flowed from it) at Thebes, which became associated with the Dirce who was Antiope's aunt. Plato has "the nymphs" as daughters of Achelous, and the 5th-century BC poet Panyassis seems also to have referred to "Achelesian nymphs". He was also the father (again with no mother mentioned) of Alcmeon's second wife Callirrhoe, whose name means "the lovely spring". Such examples suggest the possibility of a tradition in which Achelous was considered to be the father of all springs or, at least, the nymphs associated with them.

== Mythology ==
=== Heracles and Deianeira ===
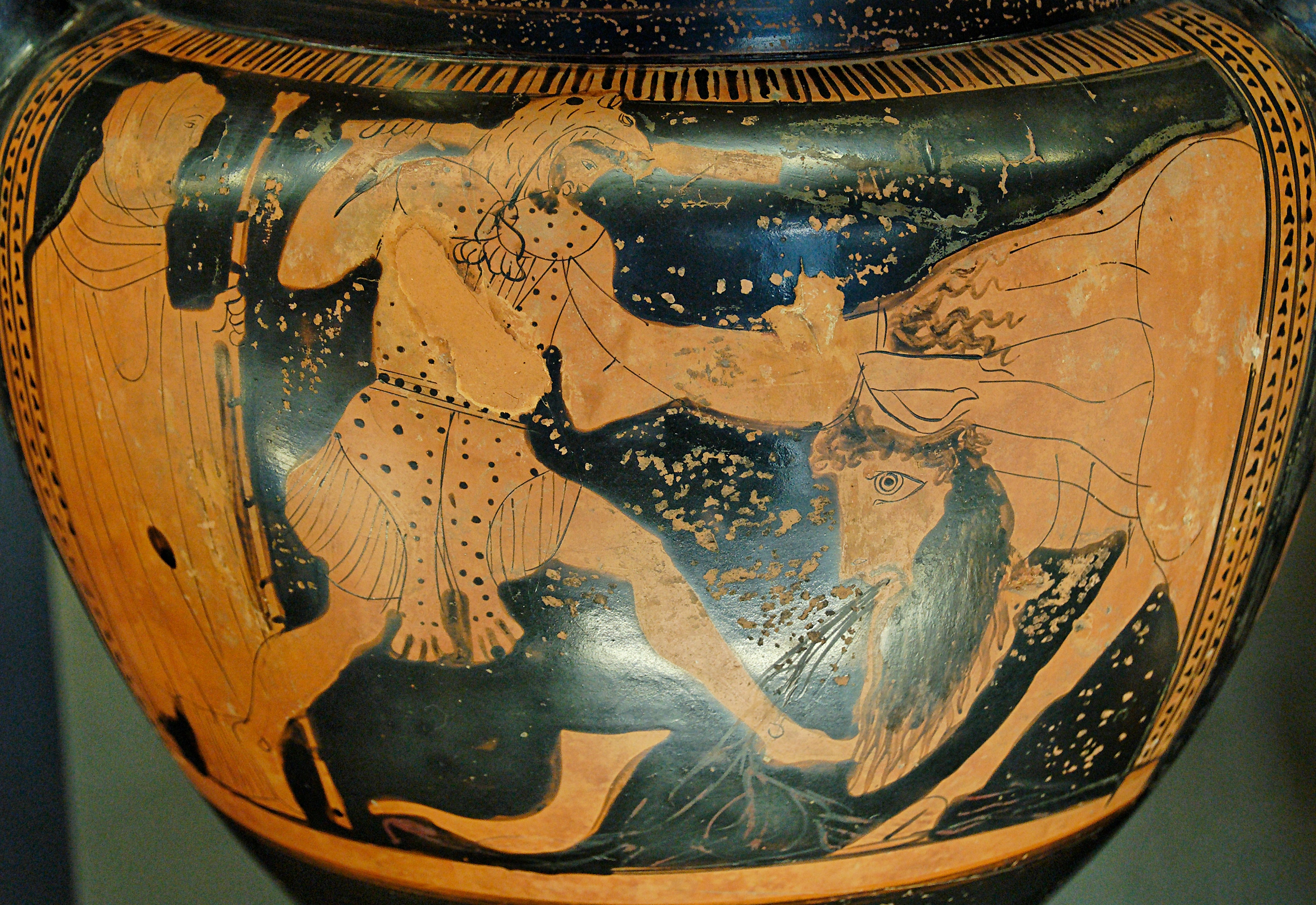
Deianeira watches Heracles fighting Achelous, the river-god's broken-off horn lies on the ground; Attic column krater, Louvre G365 (c. 460–450).

Achelous was a suitor for Deianeira, daughter of Oeneus, the king of Calydon; he transformed himself into a bull and fought Heracles for the right to marry Deianeira, but was defeated, and Heracles married Deianeira. The story of Achelous, in the form of a bull, battling with Heracles for Deianeira, was apparently told as early as the 7th century BC, in a lost poem by the Greek poet Archilochus, while according to a summary of a lost poem by the early 5th-century BC Greek poet Pindar, during the contest, Heracles broke off one of Achelous's bull-horns, and the river-god was able to get his horn back by trading it for a horn from Amalthea.

Sophocles, in his play Women of Trachis (c. 450–425 BC), has Deianeira tell her story, how Achelous wooed her in the shape of a bull, a snake, and a half-man/half-bull:

For my suitor was a river-god, Achelous, who in three shapes was always asking me from my father—coming now as a bull in visible form, now as a serpent, sheeny and coiled, now ox-faced with human trunk, while from his thick-shaded beard wellheads of fountain-water sprayed. In the expectation that such a suitor would get me, I was always praying in my misery that I might die, before I should ever approach that marriage-bed. But at last, to my joy, the glorious son of Zeus and Alcmena came and closed with him in combat and delivered me.

— Sophocles; translation by Richard Claverhouse Jebb

In later accounts, Achelous does not get his horn back, as he does in Pindar's poem. Ovid, in his poem Metamorphoses (8 AD), has Achelous tell a different story. In this version, Achelous fights Heracles, and loses three times: first in his normal (human?) shape, then as a snake, and finally as a bull. Heracles tore off one of Achelous's bull-horns, and the Naiads filled the horn with fruit and flowers, transforming it into the "Horn of Plenty" (cornucopia). According to the Fabulae (before 207 AD), by the Latin mythographer Hyginus, Heracles gave the broken-off horn to "the Hesperides (or Nymphs)", and it was "these goddesses" who "filled the horn with fruit and called it "Cornucopia". According to Strabo, in some versions of the story Heracles gave Achelous's horn to Deianeira's father Oeneus as a wedding gift. While several sources make Achelous the father, by various mothers, of the Sirens (see above), according to the 4th-century AD Greek teacher of rhetoric Libanius, they were born from the blood Achelous shed when Heracles broke off his horn.

The breaking off of Achelous' horn was rationalized as Heracles' diversion of the Acarnanian river. Both Diodorus Siculus and Strabo give such accounts. According to Diodorus, Heracles diverted the Achelous River's course, while according to Strabo, some writers "conjecturing the truth from the myths" said that, to please his father-in-law Oeneus, Heracles confined the river by means of "embankments and channels". In this way, Heracles defeated the raging river, and in so doing created a large amount of new fertile land and "certain poets, as we are told, have made this deed into a myth" (Diodorus). By both accounts, this new bountiful land of the Achelous River delta came to be known as Amaltheia's horn of plenty.

Joseph Fontenrose saw in this story the possible reflection of an ancient tradition of conflict between Zeus and Achelous. For the Latin poets during the Roman Imperial period, from Propertius onward, the story of Heracles and Achelous' contest for Deianeria continued to be popular, with Achelous as "the stereotypical unlucky lover".

=== Alcmaeon ===
Achelous played a role in the story of the Argive hero Alcmaeon, who had killed his mother Eriphyle because of her treachery against his father Amphiaraus, and needed to be religiously purified. According to Apollodorus, Alcmaeon was first purified by Phegeus the king of Psophis, but nevertheless the land of Psophis became barren because of the cursed Alcmaeon's presence. As Thucydides tells the story, the oracle of Apollo told Alcmaeon that he needed to find a land to live in that did not yet exist at the time of his mother's death. After long travels, Alcmaeon finally came to the springs of the Achelous River, where he was purified by the river-god, and received Achelous's daughter Callirrhoe as his wife, and at the mouth of the river he discovered a land newly made by deposits of river silt, where he could make his home free of his curse. Later, according to Apollodorus, Achelous commanded Alcmaeon to dedicate the necklace and robe—the cause of his mother's treachery—at Delphi, which he did.

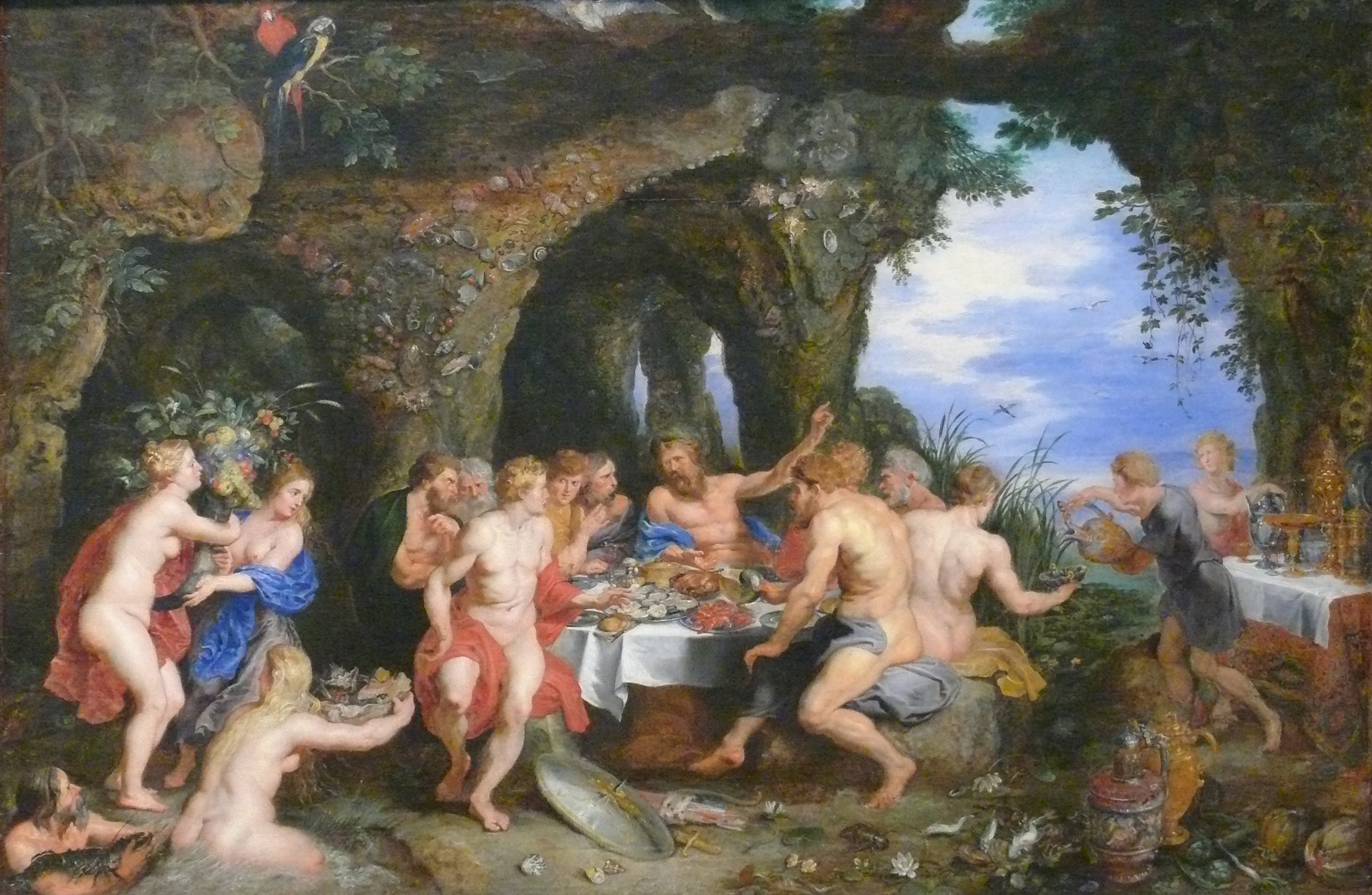
The Banquet of Achelous, by Rubens, c. 1615

=== Creation of islands ===
Ovid, in his Metamorphoses, has the river-god involved in two transformation stories concerning the creation of islands near the mouth of the Achelous River. According to Ovid, the Echinades Islands were once five local nymphs. One day, the nymphs were offering sacrifices to the gods on the banks of the Achelous, but they forgot to include Achelous himself. The river-god became so angry, he overflowed his banks with a raging flood, sweeping the nymphs away into the sea. As Achelous tells the story:

I tore forests from forests, fields from fields; and with the place they stood on, I swept the nymphs away, who at last remembered me then, into the sea. There my flood and the sea, united, cleft the undivided ground into as many parts as now you see the Echinades yonder amid the waves.

— Ovid; translation by James G. Frazer, revised by G. P. Goold.

Achelous goes on to describe the creation of another island: "far away beyond the others is one island that I love: the sailors call it Perimele." She was the daughter of Hippodamas, whose virginity Achelous took from her. Her enraged father threw her off a high cliff into the sea. But Achelous prayed to Poseidon to save her, and in answer Poseidon transformed the girl into an island.

== Water and wine ==
Achelous's name could be used to refer to water in general. Thus Euripides can have a house, far from the Achelous river itself, being sprinkled with "Achelous' water", or have servants "bring Achelous" [Ἀχελῷον φέρειν] to douse a fire, while the comic playwright Aristophanes, in his Lysistrata, has the Woman's chorus leader, while pouring water on the Men's chorus, say "Achelous, you're on!".

In particular, his name was used to refer to the water that was mixed with wine for drinking. Examples include three fragments from now lost fifth-century BC Attic plays. A Sophocles fragment has the single line: "So Achelous runs with wine in our place", and a fragment from a satyr play by Achaeus has unhappy satyrs complaining about too much "of Achelous" being mixed with the wine they are being given to drink. An Aristophanes fragment has a character complain about the aftereffects of drinking unwatered wine:

I had a savage fit

of vomiting, for the wine stirred me up,

having no admixture of Achelous

— Aristophanes; translation by Jeffrey Henderson.

Ovid, in his Fasti, uses Achelous' name as a stand in for water when he connects wine drinking with the wearing of flowers in the hair:

No serious business does he do whose brow is garlanded; no water of the running brook is quaffed by such as twine their hair with flowers: so long as thy stream, Achelous, was dashed with no juice of grapes, none cared to pluck the rose.

— Ovid; translation by James G. Frazer, revised by G. P. Goold.

Virgil has Liber (Dionysus) responsible for the mixing of the "draughts of Achelous" with wine. While according to Hyginus, a man named Cerasus was the first to mix wine with "the Achelous river in Aetolia", explaining that this is why the word for "mixing" in Greek is cerasai. Achelous is also mythologically linked with Dionysus and wine, through his connection with Deianeira, and her father Oeneus. There are various stories involving Oeneus (whose name means "Wine-man") Dionysus, and the origins of wine. According to Apollodorus, Oeneus was the first mortal given the grape vine by Dionysus. Hyginus explains that Oeneus was given the grape vine and instruction on viticulture by the wine-god, as a reward for his "generous hospitality" in having turned a blind eye to the god seducing his wife and fathering Deianeira.

== Cult ==
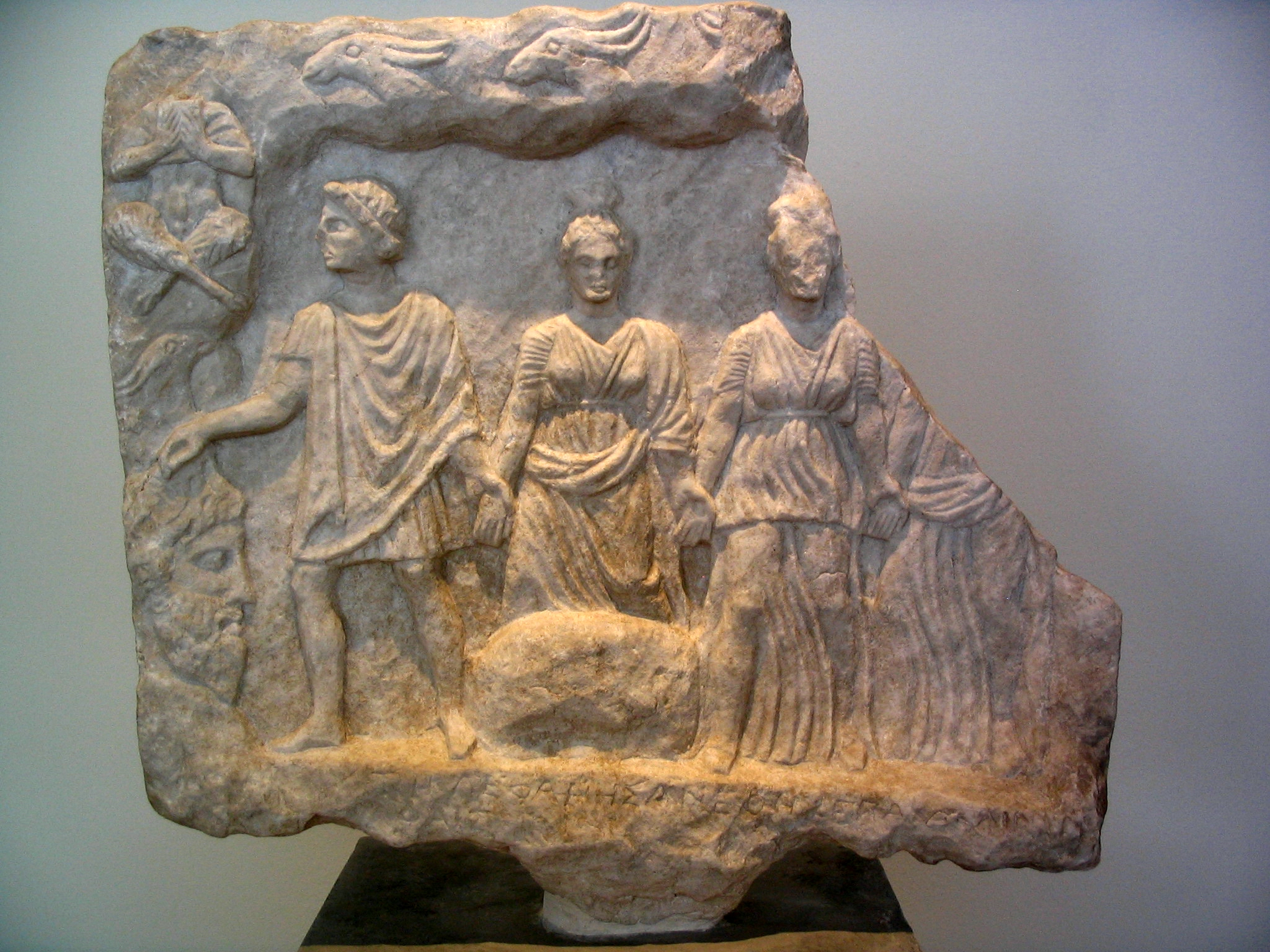
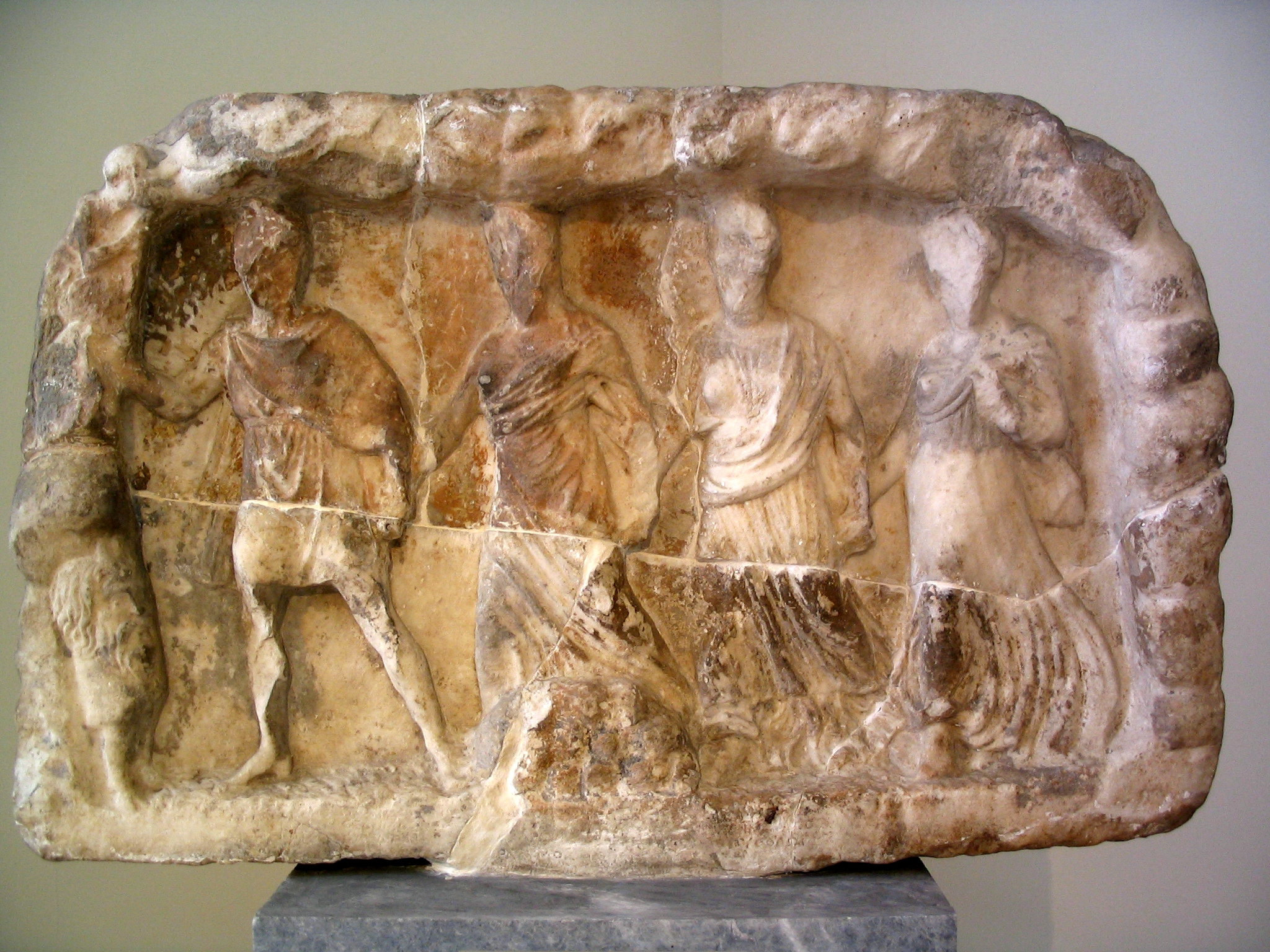
Two votive reliefs from the Cave of Pan, on Mount Parnes in Attica. Each is in the form of a cave, with four central figures, a male leading three nymphs, all holding hands gathered around a small stone altar (dancing?). Achelous is represented as being carved into the cave wall (bottom left). National Archaeological Museum, Athens 1448 (top), and 1859 (bottom).

Achelous was a rural-agricultural water god whose importance was a reflection of the agricultural importance of rivers and their fertile river deltas. This relationship is also reflected in the association of Achelous' broken-off horn with the cornucopia or horn of plenty. Apparently some ancient Greeks considered sacrifices to Achelous to be even more important than those to the agriculture goddess Demeter. Many inscriptions attest to the cult of Achelous, which was particularly associated with the oracle at Dodona. Although of early importance, his cult declined in significance from the end of the fourth-century BC.

From at least as early as Homer, Achelous was apparently considered to be an important divinity throughout Greece. Calling Achelous "king", Homer mentions Achelous (along with Oceanus) as a mighty river, using him as a measure of the strength of (the even mightier) Zeus:

With [Zeus] doth not even king Achelous vie, nor the great might of deep-flowing Ocean, from whom all rivers flow and every sea, and all the springs and deep wells; howbeit even he hath fear of the lightning of great Zeus, and his dread thunder, whenso it crasheth from heaven.

— Homer; translation by A. T. Murray

The clear implication is that Achelous is the mightiest of the rivers (save perhaps for Oceanus himself), which would be in accord with Acusilaus' making Achelous the "oldest and most honoured" of the river-god offspring of Oceanus. However some ancient scholars thought that the line: "nor the great might of deep-flowing Ocean", was spurious, which would in fact make Achelous—rather than Oceanus—the source of all other waters. A commentary on Iliad 21.195, preserved on Oxyrhynchus Papyrus 221, contains a fragment of a poem, possibly from the Epic tradition, which mentions "the waters of silver-eddying Achelous" being the source of "the whole sea". A late-5th-century BC commentary on an Orphic theogony, preserved by the Derveni Papyrus, quotes a poetic fragment calling the rivers the "sinews of Achelous". The same Oxyrhynchus Papyrus also quotes ancient verses which apparently equated Achelous and Oceanus, and that "many people sacrifice to Achelois before sacrificing to Demeter, since Acheloios is the name of all rivers and the crop comes from water".

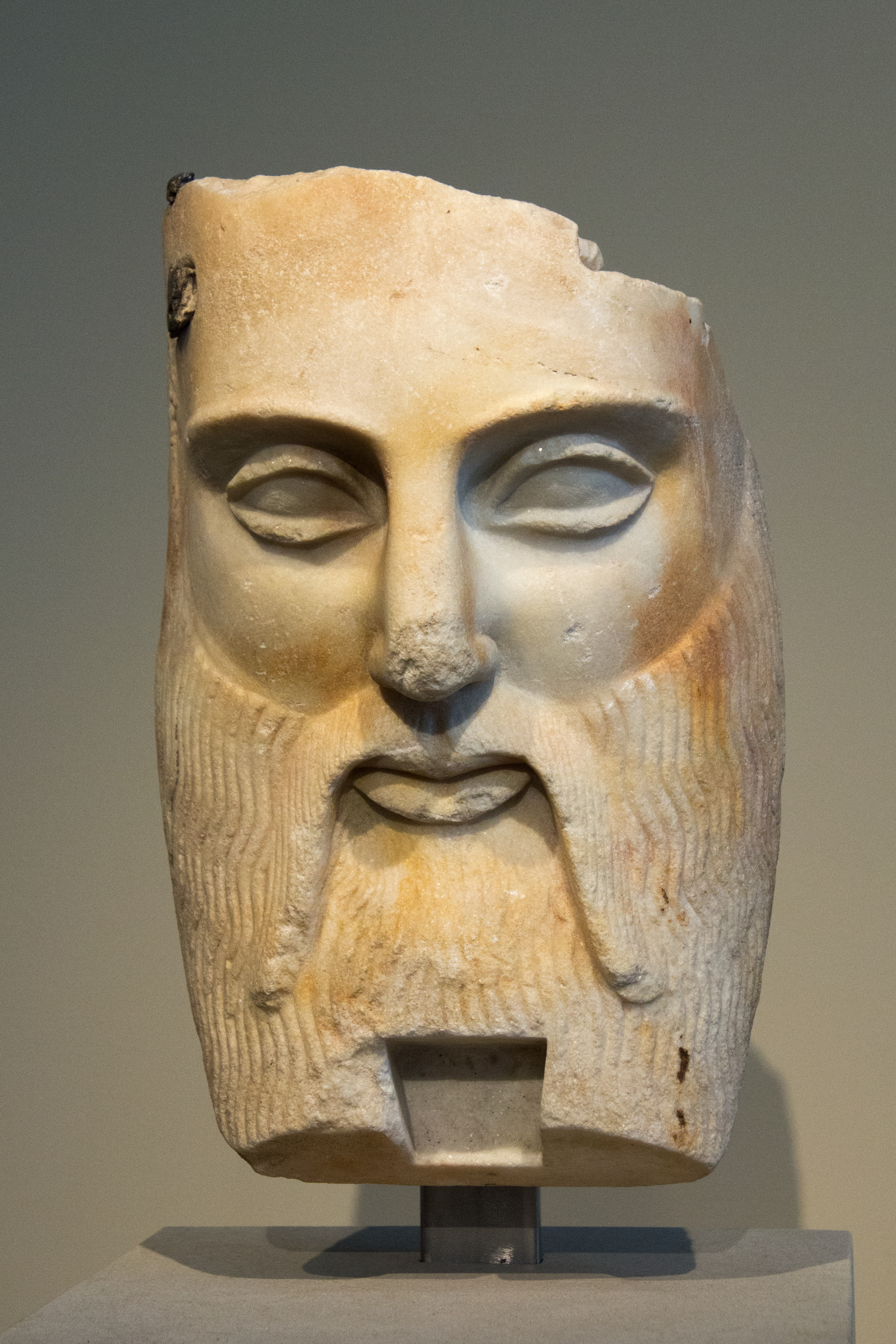
A possible Achelous cult mask, with dowel holes where bronze horns and ears were perhaps attached and the mask hung; Marble mask from Marathon, Berlin Antikensammlung SK 100.

Achelous as a cultic figure is attested as early as the seventh century BC. The 2nd-century geographer Pausanias, reports seeing, near Megara, an altar to Achelous erected by the seventh-century BC "tyrant", Theagenes of Megara. Achelous was the only river-god to achieve Panhellenic cult status. By the fifth century BC he shared many sanctuaries with his daughters the nymphs. Achelous appears in many votive reliefs which often include nymphs. Such reliefs were given as dedications in sanctuaries. A votive relief (Athens 1488), dedicated to "Pan and the Nymphs", shows Hermes leading three nymphs in a cave, with a relief head of Achelous depicted on the wall of the cave. In a similar votive relief (Athens 1859), Achelous is depicted as a bull with a human head. Achelous could also be venerated in the form of stylized votive masks, similar to the cult masks of the wine-god Dionysus. A well-known example of such a cult mask, considered to be Achelous, is a marble mask (c. 490–470 BC) from Marathon (Berlin SK 100).

According to the early 4th-century BC Greek historian Ephorus, the oracle at Dodona usually added to his pronouncements the command to offer sacrifices to Achelous, and that, while people would offer sacrifices to their local river, only the Achelous river was honoured everywhere, with Achelous's name often being invoked in oaths, prayers and sacrifices, "all the things that concern the gods". Ephorus, explaining the "puzzle" of why Achelous name was used to mean water, said that, because of the frequent oracular command at Dodona to offer sacrifices to Achelous, it came to be thought that by "Achelous" the oracle meant, not the river but "water" in general.

Plato's Phaedrus has Socrates, walking in the countryside along the Ilissus river, come across a "sacred place of some nymphs and of Achelous, judging by the figurines and statues". In addition to the altar to Achelous near Megara, Pausanias also mentions a part of the altar at the Amphiareion of Oropos dedicated to "the nymphs and to Pan, and to the rivers Achelous and Cephisus", and the Megarian Treasury at Olympia, which contained a dedication representing the fight of Heracles with Achelous.

== River-gods and bulls ==
Achelous as a bull in the story of his contest with Heracles is part of a Greek tradition, perhaps as old as Homer (or older), of associating rivers and river-gods with bulls. Strabo reports that according to some "the Acheloüs, like the other rivers, was called 'like a bull' from the roaring of its waters, and also from the bendings of its streams, which were called Horns". This association is reflected in the fact that the Greeks depicted river-gods as part bull from at least the Archaic period onward. There is also an ancient association between horns and the fertility that rivers provide, as can be seen in the story of the horn of plenty.

== Iconography ==
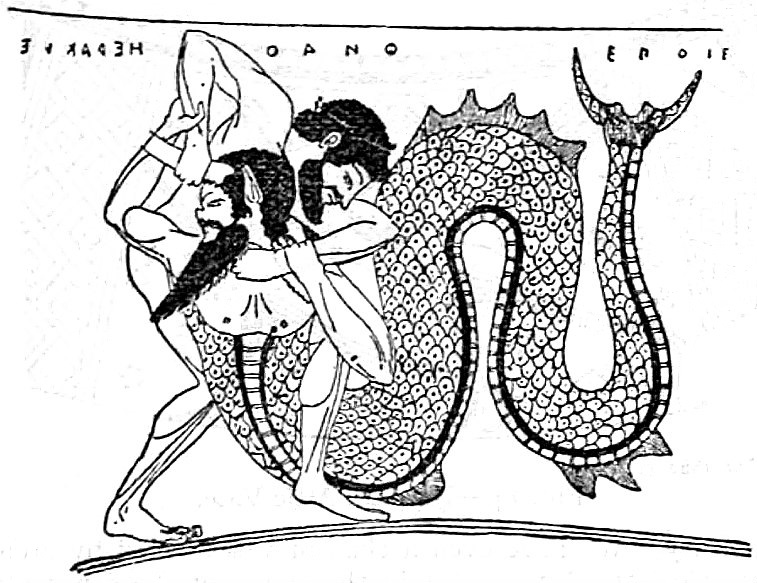
Heracles wrestling with Achelous in the form of the sea-god Triton; Achelous has one bull's horn and a bull's ear, a human torso, and a snaky fish tail. Heracles grabs Achelous by his horn and strangles him with the other hand, while the river-god tries to loosen Heracles' grip. Illustration from British Museum E437 (pictured above).

Achelous was a popular subject in ancient Greek art. There are many depictions of his fight with Heracles over Deianeira, with over twenty surviving examples in Attic vase painting alone. Achelous also appears in many votive reliefs along with other divinities often including nymphs. In these contexts, in which the identity of the figure as Achelous is secured by inscription, the river-god is characteristically portrayed in the form of a man-bull, i.e. a bull with a bull-horned and bull-eared human face, head or torso and a bison-like beard, either in full-figure, or in the abbreviated form of a man-bull torso, head or particularly a mask. Achelous' man-bull iconography probably derived from oriental art. Much more rarely, Achelous can also be found depicted in human form. Besides Greek art, Achelous was also a common figure in Etruscan art.

=== Achelous and Heracles ===
Achelous' contest with Heracles was the subject of many vase-paintings, from as early as the second quarter of the sixth century BC, and in most of these vases, Heracles can be seen grabbing Achelous by his single horn. Possibly the earliest version of the scene (c. 600–560 BC) appears on the figure frieze of a Middle Corinthian kylix cup (Brussels A1374), which depicts Heracles wrestling with a horned centaur-like Achelous, with a human torso and a bull's or horse's body, watched by the figure of an old man (Oineus?) and a woman (Deianeira?). The earliest (c. 570 BC) Attic versions (New York 59.64, Boston 99.519) depict Achelous as a bull with a man's head and beard. Although many early depiction of this scene represent Achelous as a centaur, by the fifth century BC he is commonly represented as a bull with a human face.

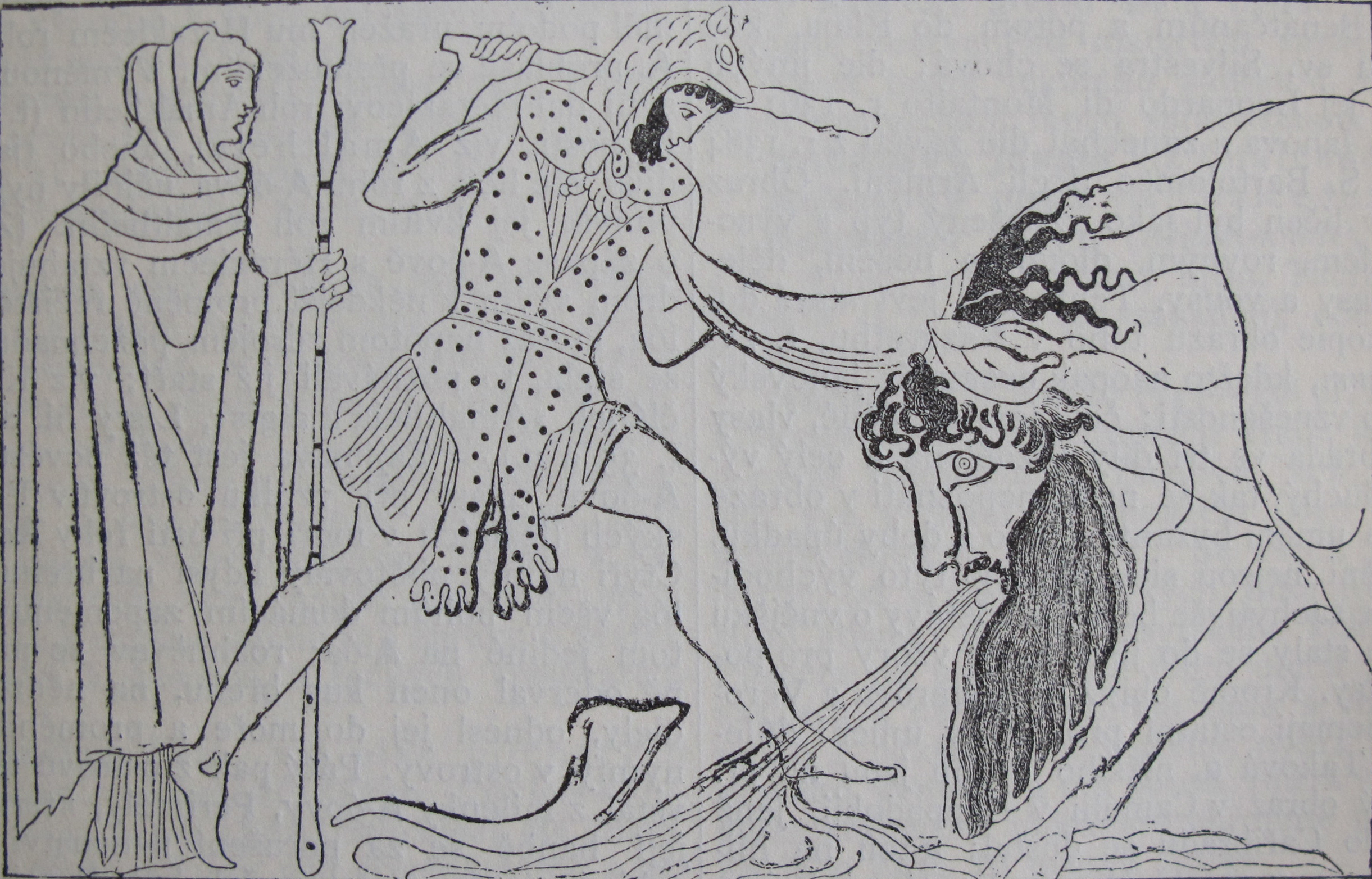
Deianeira (left) as veiled bride watches right; Heracles, with raised club holds Achelous (in his characteristic man-bull form) by a horn; a broken-off horn lies on the ground; Achelous spouts water from his mouth. Illustration from Louvre G365 (pictured above).

On one later example (c. 525–475 BC), an Attic red-figure stamnos from Cerveteri attributed to Oltos (British Museum E437), Achelous (identified by inscription) is shown with a bearded human upper torso, attached to a long serpentine body, with a fish's tail. This is similar to the depictions of the sea-god Triton which appear on many other Attic vases. Heracles (also identified by inscription) appears about to break off the river-god's single horn. On a somewhat later (c. 475–425 BC) red-figure Attic column krater (Louvre G365), Achelous's broken-off horn lies on the ground, while Heracles holds Achelous by his other horn, and threatens him with a club held overhead. Figures depicting Oineus and Deianeira (as on Louvre G365) and also Athena and Hermes are sometimes included in the scene.

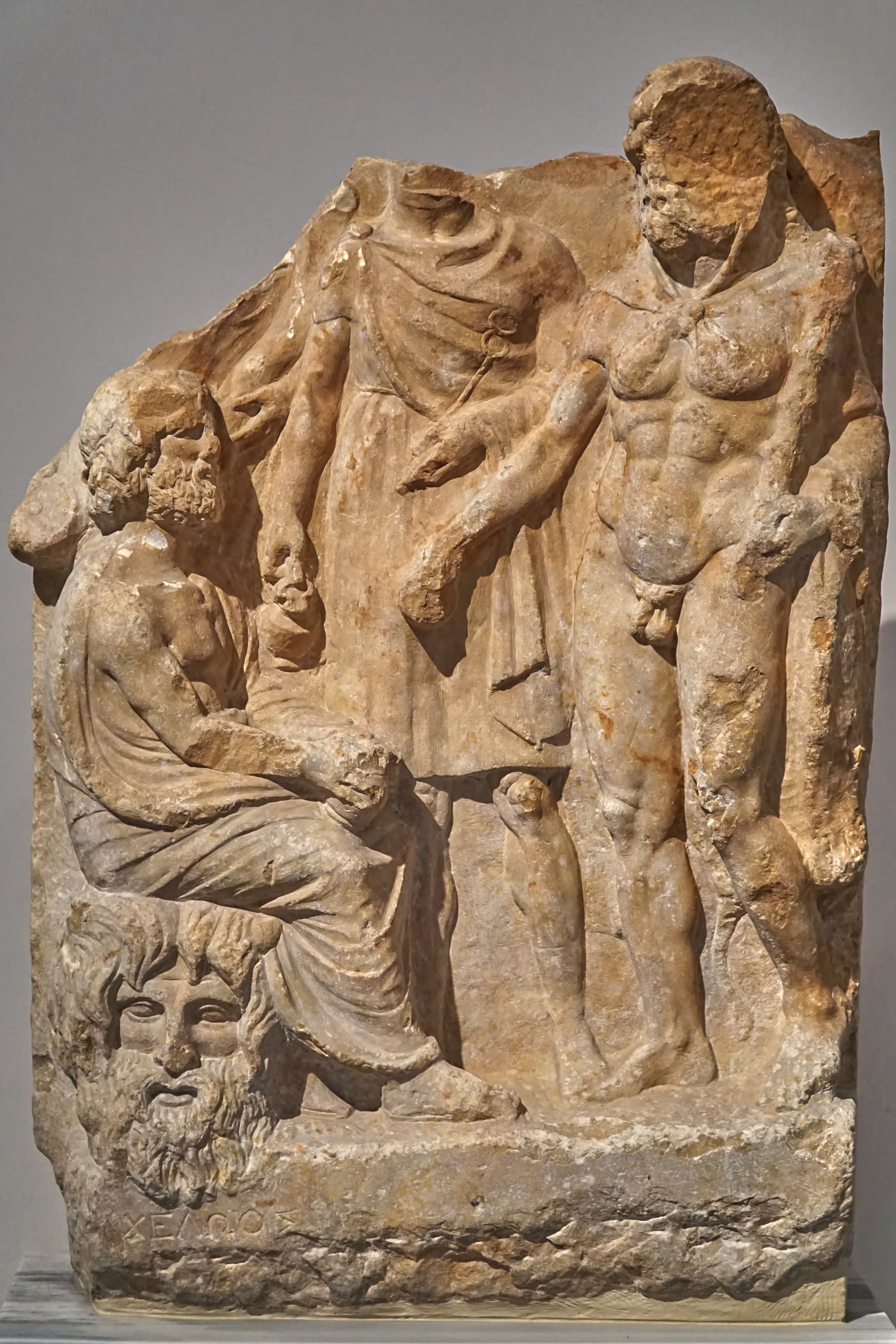
Heracles (right), being presented by Hermes (center) to Zeus (seated left). The side of Zeus' seat is decorated with a mask of Achelous identified by inscription below. Marble votive relief found near the Ilissos river, National Archaeological Museum, Athens 1778.

Pausanias reports seeing the scene represented on the throne of Amyclae, and also in the Megarian Treasury at Olympia, where he describes seeing "small cedar-wood figures inlaid with gold" which, besides Achelous, included Zeus, Deianeira, Heracles, and Ares aiding Achelous.

=== Votive reliefs ===
Beginning in the late fifth century BC, Achelous also appears in many votive reliefs. Such reliefs often include his daughters the nymphs. Three marble Attic reliefs (Athens 1445, 1448, and 1859) have the form of a cave, with four central figures, a male leading three nymphs, all holding hands gathered around a small stone altar (dancing?). Achelous, along with other figures, is represented as being carved into the cave wall. In two of these (1448 and 1859, pictured above) the male central figure is Hermes, in the other he is Pan. Votive reliefs without nymphs are also common. A votive relief (Athens 1778), dedicated to Zeus and found near the Ilissos river, shows Zeus sitting on a stone seat decorated with the face of Achelous.

=== Other contexts ===
Although depictions of Achelous in the form of a man-bull in Heracles scenes and votive reliefs are very common, far more common are depictions of a man-bull unaccompanied by other figures. In these contexts—where no inscription allows certain identification—the interpretation of such an individual man-bull as being Achelous is inferred. In particular, depictions of a man-bull are found on the coins of many cites in Magna Graecia, Sicily, and elsewhere. In addition to vase paintings, votive reliefs, and coins, man-bull depictions can also be found on many other kinds of artifacts, including gems, jewelry, bronzes, and architectural terracottas.

== Possible origins ==
That Achelous, rather than Oceanus, was perhaps, in some earlier version of the Iliad, the source of "all rivers ... and every sea", and that his name was often used to mean "water" (along with other evidence from ancient sources), have suggested the possibility to modern scholars that Achelous may have predated Oceanus as the original Greek water-god.

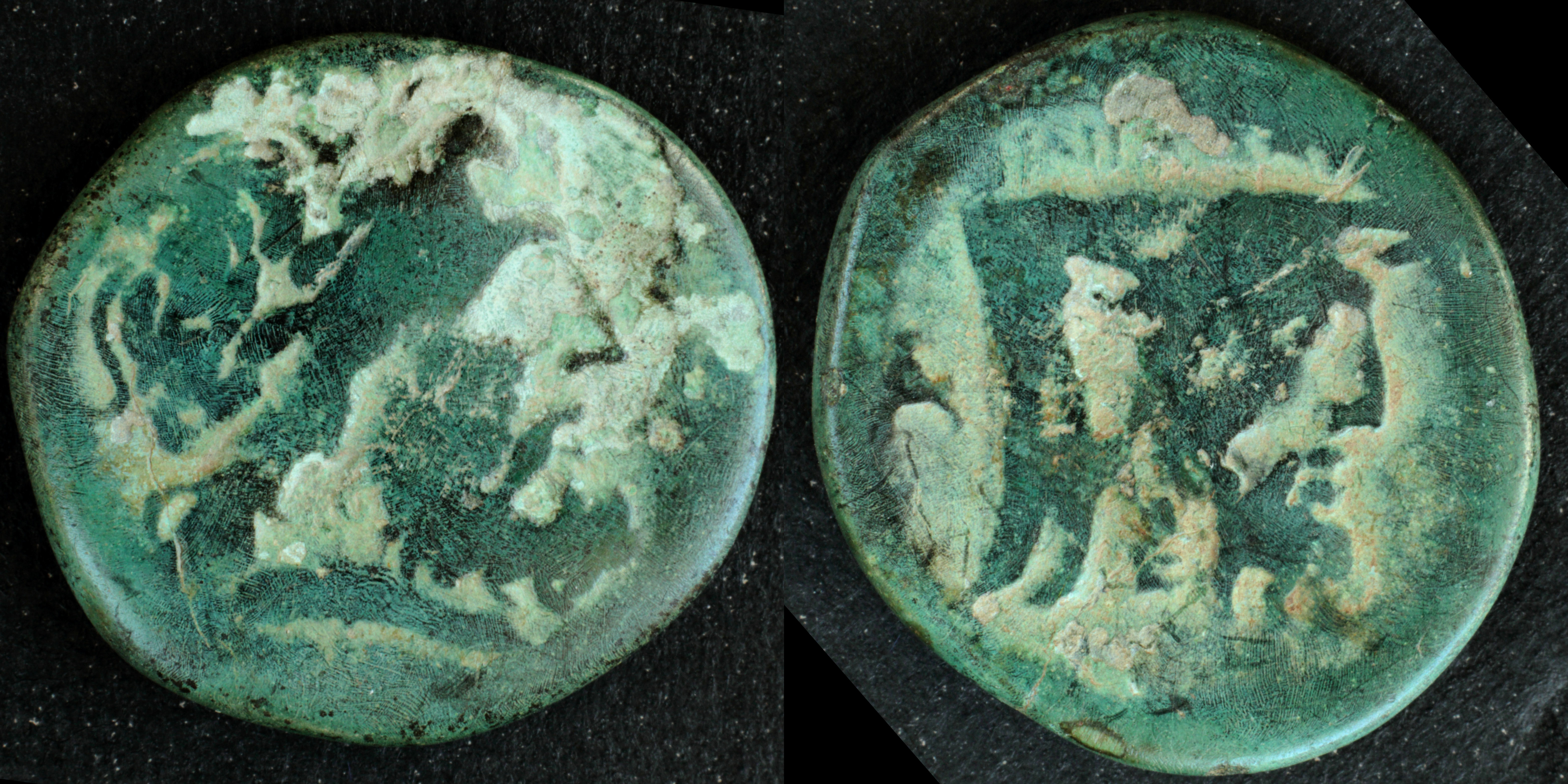
Bronze coin struck in Oiniadai, c. 215 BC, depicting the river-god Achelous as man-faced bull on reverse.

A recent study has tried to show that both the form and substance of Achelous, as a god of water primarily depicted as a man-faced bull, have roots in Old Europe in the Bronze Age, and that after the disappearance of many Old European cultures, the traditions traveled to the Near East at the beginning of 4th millennium BC (Ubaid period), and finally migrated to Greece, Italy, Sicily, and Sardinia with itinerant sea-folk during the Late Bronze Age through the Orientalizing period. Although no single cult of Achelous persisted throughout all of these generations, the iconography and general mythos easily spread from one culture to another, and all examples of man-faced bulls are found around the area of the Mediterraneanan, suggesting some intercultural continuity.

Achelous was also an important deity in the Etruscan religion, intimately related to water as in the Greek tradition but also carrying significant chthonic associations. Man-faced bull iconography was first adapted to represent Achelous by the Etruscans in the 8th century BC, and the Greeks later adopted this same tradition.

The leading exponents into the Greek and Etruscan worlds were seer-healers and mercenaries during the Iron Age, and Achelous as a man-faced bull becomes an emblem employed by mercenaries in the Greek world for centuries. These earlier figures probably adapted the mythological and iconographic traditions of Asallúhi (also Asarlúhi or Asaruludu), the "princely bison" of Near Eastern traditions that "rises to the surface of the earth in springs and marshes, ultimately flowing as rivers".

== Achelous River ==
The Achelous River rises in the Pindus mountains, flows into the Ionian Sea near the Echinades Islands in western Greece, and divided ancient Acarnania and Aetolia. Servius gives a story of the origin of the river. He says that one day Achelous, who was said to be the son of Earth, lost his daughters the Sirens, and in his grief he called upon his mother, who received him into her bosom, and on that spot, Earth caused a river, bearing his name, to gush forth.

Pseudo-Plutarch gives a different story for how the river acquired its name. He says it was formerly called Thestius, after a son of Mars and Pisidice, who jumped into the river after discovering he had killed his son Calydon by mistake. In a similar fashion the river acquired the name Achelous, after a son of Oceanus and the nymph Naïs, who jumped into the river after he discovered he had slept with his daughter Cletoria by mistake.

Strabo reports that in "earlier times" the river was called the Thoas. According to Strabo, some writers "conjecturing the truth from the myths" attributed various legends concerning the river-god, to features of the Achelous River itself. These writers said that, like other rivers, the Achelous was called "like a bull", because of the river's roaring waters and its meanders (which he says were called horns). Likewise the Achelous was called "like a serpent" because of the river's great length and many serpentine turnings.

Achelous was a common river name. There were several other rivers with that name in ancient times. In addition to "king Achelous", Homer apparently knew of an Achelous river in Lydia, near Mount Sipylos:

on the lonely mountains, on Sipylus, where, men say, are the couches of goddesses, of the nymphs that range swiftly in the dance about Achelous,

— Homer's Iliad; translation by A. T. Murray, revised by William F. Wyatt

Strabo mentions two other rivers named Achelous, one in Achaea near Dyme, also called the Peiros, the other in Thessaly near Lamia. Pausanias mentions one more, a tributary of the Alpheius in the Peloponnese, near Mount Lycaeus in Arcadia. The multiplicity of rivers with the same name, perhaps due to the river-god's equation with water, has also been seen as suggesting the possibility that Achelous was originally "the primal source of all water".

== Metamorphoses ==
Ovid, in his Metamorphoses, provided a descriptive interlude when Theseus is the guest of Achelous, waiting for the river's raging flood to subside: "He entered the dark building, made of spongy pumice, and rough tuff. The floor was moist with soft moss, and the ceiling banded with freshwater mussel and oyster shells."
