= Alphesiboea (daughter of Phegeus) =

Arcadian princess in Greek mythology

In Greek mythology, Alphesiboea (Ancient Greek: Ἀλφεσίβοια, romanized: Alphesíboia, lit. 'oxen' or 'rearing/ fetching cattle', pronounced [alpʰesíboi̯a]), in some versions also called Arsinoë, is an Arcadian princess from the ancient Greek kingdom of Psophis, daughter of King Phegeus. Alphesiboea marries Alcmaeon after the murder of his mother, but he ends up deserting her for the love of another woman. Alcmaeon is then murdered by Alphesiboea's male relatives. Alphesiboea was one of the several owners of the necklace of Harmonia, a cursed artefact that brought ill fortune to its possessors.

Due to the great popularity of Alcmaeon's myth in antiquity, Alphesiboea is known to have appeared in many ancient dramatizations of the story, none of which are preserved today. At least three tragedies titled Alphesiboea are known to have been produced, alongside several Alcmaeons.

== Family ==
Alphesiboea was the daughter of the Psophian king Phegeus by an unnamed mother, sister to Axion and Temenus. She had a son, Clytius, and also an unnamed daughter by her husband Alcmaeon.

== Mythology ==
Alphesiboea lived in the court of her father with her brothers Axion and Temenus when Alcmaeon of Argos arrived in Psophis asking to be purified of the murder of his mother Eriphyle, whom he had killed for her indirect role in the death of his father Amphiaraus. Phegeus gladly helped him, and afterward he gave Alphesiboea as wife to Alcmaeon, who gifted the cursed necklace of Harmonia and her robe to his new bride.

They lived together for a while during which Alphesiboea gave birth to a son named Clytius, but Alcmaeon's curse for murdering his mother did not go away; either his disease worsened, or the ground grew infertile, disrupting agriculture and bringing a great famine to the land. He was commanded by Apollo's oracle to depart the land of Psophis at once, which he did. Alcmaeon eventually settled in Acarnania in the lands by the river Achelous. There he met and married the nymph Callirrhoe, daughter of the river-god, despite his wife being still alive in Psophis.

Callirrhoe however greatly desired the necklace and robe of Harmonia, which Alphesiboea still possessed back in Arcadia. So Alcmaeon was forced to return to Psophis and his lawful wife, where he was ambushed and treacherously killed by Alphesiboea's two brothers, who were acting on their father Phegeus’ command. In some versions, Phegeus himself personally killed Alcmaeon, as well as Alphesiboea's own daughter. When Alphesiboea reprimanded her male relatives for the unjust murder of Alcmaeon, her brothers locked her in a chest and sold her as slave to the Tegean Agapenor, falsely claiming it had been her who slew her husband. Although multiple accounts exist about the fate of her father, brothers and necklace afterwards, Alphesiboea typically disappears from the ancient narratives after her enslavement, and her ultimate fate is unknown.

The sole exception is the Elegies of Propertius, according to which Alphesiboea avenged the late Alcmaeon by killing Axion and Temenus. However, no other extant source suggests such turn of events. Nevertheless, it is possible that Propertius knew a version in which the now enslaved Alphesiboea played an instrumental role in bringing down her male relatives with the help of Alcmaeon and Callirrhoe's sons, who are traditionally said to have been the ones to kill Phegeus and his sons to avenge their father.

== In ancient Greek drama ==
Several ancient tragedies dramatising the events at Psophis were written in classical antiquity, though none of them survives in anything more than fragments. The ancient playwrights Achaeus, Chaeremon and Timotheus each wrote a tragedy titled Alphesiboea (of which only few words or lines are preserved), while Sophocles wrote a similarly lost Alcmaeon, and Euripides Alcmaeon in Psophis. In Sophocles' version it seems that Alphesiboea was imprisoned by her brothers to prevent her from avenging Alcmaeon's death. Meanwhile Theodectes' lost Alcmeon appears to cover the events during the early days of Alcmaeon's arrival at Psophis, when he was still a relative stranger to Alphesiboea and giving her an account of his previous life and misdeeds, trying to justify his murder of Eriphyle.

== See also ==
- Hyrnetho
- Cassiphone
- Harpalyce

== Bibliography ==
- Bell, Robert E. (1991). Women of Classical Mythology: A Biographical Dictionary. ABC-Clio. ISBN 9780874365818.
- Apollodorus, Apollodorus, The Library, with an English Translation by Sir James George Frazer, F.B.A., F.R.S. in 2 Volumes. Cambridge, MA, Harvard University Press; London, William Heinemann Ltd. 1921. Online version at the Perseus Digital Library.
- Heslin, Peter J. (2018). Propertius, Greek Myth, and Virgil: Rivalry, Allegory, and Polemic. Oxford, UK: Oxford University Press. ISBN 978-0-19-954157-7.
- Hyginus, Gaius Julius, The Myths of Hyginus. Edited and translated by Mary A. Grant, Lawrence: University of Kansas Press, 1960.
- March, Jennifer R. (May 31, 2014). Dictionary of Classical Mythology. Oxbow Books. ISBN 978-1-78297-635-6.
- Pausanias, Description of Greece with an English Translation by W.H.S. Jones, Litt.D., and H.A. Ormerod, M.A., in 4 Volumes. Cambridge, MA, Harvard University Press; London, William Heinemann Ltd. 1918. Online version at the Perseus Digital Library.
- Propertius, The Elegies, with an English translation and in-depth name index by A. S. Kline. 2001. Text available online in Poetry in Translation.
- Smith, William (1873). A Dictionary of Greek and Roman Biography and Mythology. London, UK: John Murray, printed by Spottiswoode and Co. Online version at the Perseus.tufts library.
- Sophocles, The Fragments of Sophocles, translated by A. C. Pearson, and edited by Sir R. C. Jebb and Dr W. G. Headlam. Cambridge, UK: Cambridge University Press, 1917. Online text available at the Internet Archive.
- Thorburn, John E. Jr (2005). The Facts on File Companion to Classical Drama. New York City, NY: Infobase Publishing. ISBN 0-8160-5202-6.
- Wright, Matthew (November 3, 2016). The Lost Plays of Greek Tragedy. Vol. 1: Neglected Authors. London, NYC: Bloomsbury Publishing. ISBN 978-1-47256-776-5.
