= Alcmaeon (mythology) =

Leader of the Epigoni in the legendary second Argos-Thebes war

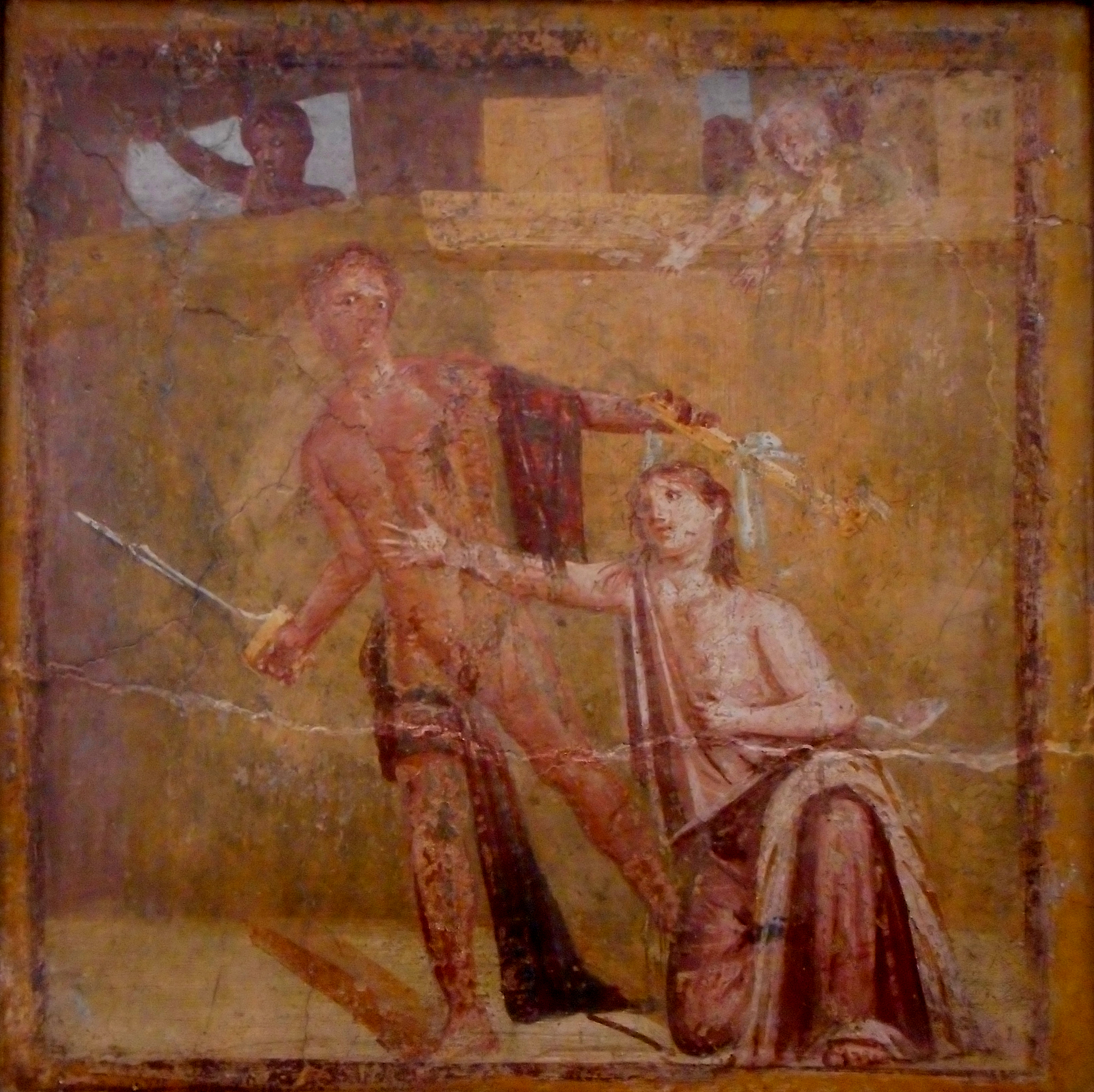
Alcmaeon killing his mother Eriphyle

In Greek mythology, Alcmaeon (/ˌælkˈmiːən/; Ancient Greek: Ἀλκμαίων, romanized: Alkmaíōn, lit. 'brave', 'strong' or 'mighty'), as one of the Epigoni, was the leader of the Argives who attacked Thebes, taking the city in retaliation for the deaths of their fathers, the Seven against Thebes, who died while attempting the same thing.

== Family ==
Alcmaeon was the son of Amphiaraus and Eriphyle and brother of Amphilochus. He had many progeny by different women including Clytius by Alphesiboea or Arsinoe, daughter of Phegeus; Amphoterus and Acarnan by Callirhoe, daughter of Achelous and lastly Amphilochus and Tisiphone by Manto, daughter of Tiresias.

His son Clytius founded the Klytidiai, a clan of seers in Elis who interpreted the oracles of the Temple of Zeus at Olympia.

== Mythology ==
=== The second Theban war ===
Pindar's eighth Pythian ode relates a prophecy by Amphiaraus that the Epigoni will conquer Thebes, and that Alcmaeon will be the first through the gates. The mythographer Apollodorus, also states that the other Epigoni received an oracle instructing them to make Alcmaeon their leader, and therefore convinced him to go with them, although he was unwilling. In Diodorus, Eriphyle persuades her son to join the attackers because she is bribed by Thersander to do so in exchange for the robe of Harmonia, just as she was bribed by Polynices with the necklace of Harmonia to send her husband Amphiaraus into battle. However, according to Asclepiades of Tragilus, Amphiaraus orders Alcmaeon to avenge him on Eriphyle as soon as he is old enough, making it clear that at least two traditions are present. In most versions, he kills Laodamas, the son of Eteocles, in the battle.

Although sources differ concerning whether Alcmaeon knew about his mother's treachery before he attacked Thebes, all agree that once he returned he killed his mother, possibly with the help of his younger brother Amphilochus.

According to Ephorus, Alcmaeon then accompanied Diomedes into Aetolia to take vengeance upon the enemies of Diomedes' grandfather, Oeneus. Later, when the Trojan War broke out, Alcmaeon feared that Diomedes would usurp the rest of Argos while he was away, and refused to take part. Agamemnon therefore invited both Alcmaeon and Diomedes to join him. While Diomedes was persuaded to go to Troy, Alcmaeon remained vexed and stayed home.

=== Death ===
For committing matricide, he was pursued by the Erinyes and driven mad, fleeing first to Arcadia, where his grandfather Oicles ruled, and then to King Phegeus in Psophis, who purified him and gave him his daughter, Arsinoe (according to Apollodorus) or Alphesiboea (according to the geographer Pausanias), in marriage. Alcmaeon gave her the necklace and robe of Harmonia. According to Apollodorus, Alcmaeon's presence caused the land to be infertile, so he went to Delphi for assistance. In Pausanias, it is his own madness which drove him to do so.

From there the two accounts generally agree with each other and with Thucydides. Alcmaeon is instructed by the oracle to find a land which did not exist at the time when he was polluted by killing his mother. Accordingly, he goes to a delta of the Achelous river, which was newly formed. There he marries Callirrhoe, the daughter of the river's god. She had heard of the famous necklace and robe of Harmonia, and asks Alcmaeon to get them for her. He complies, returning to Psophis and telling king Phegeus that he required the necklace and robe in order to be purified. Either Phegeus or his sons (Agenor and Pronous) discovers the truth from a servant, and they ambush and kill Alcmaeon. In Apollodorus, Arsinoe, the daughter of Phegeus, chastises her brothers, who put her into a chest and sell her as a slave to Agapenor. Meanwhile, Callirrhoe prays to Zeus that her sons will grow up instantaneously so that they might take revenge on her husband's murderers. Zeus grants this, and Amphoterus and Acarnan meet the sons of Phegeus at Agapenor's house, when they are on their way to Delphi to dedicate Harmonia's robe and necklace there. After killing them, Amphoterus and Acarnan continue to Psophis and killed king Phegeus and his queen, after which they are forced to flee to Tegea.

=== Different version from Euripides ===
Apollodorus relates a different myth about this same Alcmaeon, attributing it to Euripides. During his madness, Alcmaeon had two children with Manto: Amphilochus and Tisiphone. Alcmaeon entrusted the children to Creon, the king of Corinth, who raised them. Creon's wife, however, became fearful that Creon might marry Tisiphone because of her great beauty, and sold the girl as a slave. Through a great coincidence, it was Alcmaeon who purchased Tisiphone and kept her as his "handmaid", not knowing who she was. When he returned to Corinth to retrieve his children, her identity was somehow revealed, and Amphilocus went on to colonize Amphilochian Argos.

This story was probably the subject of Euripides' lost Alcmaeon in Corinth, which was produced posthumously. Whether the story was invented for this play is unclear.

The epic poem Alcmeonis as well as Sophocles' play Alcmaeon, and those by Achaeus, Agathon, and Astydamas, are known of, but have all been lost.
