= Psophis =

Ancient settlement in Arcadia, Greece

Coordinates: 37°52′18″N 21°53′34″E

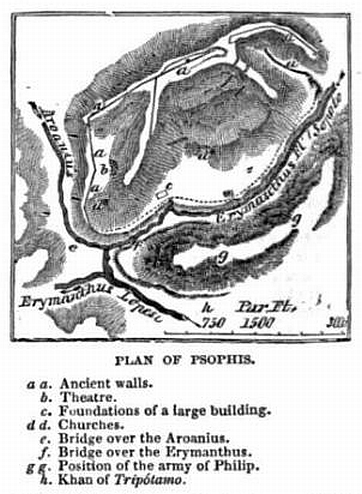

Psophis (Ancient Greek: Ψωφίς, Eth. Ψωφίδιος) was an ancient Greek city in the northwest end of Arcadia, bounded on the north by Achaea, and on the west by Elis. It was located near the modern village Psofida, part of the municipality of Kalavryta.

== City name and mythology ==
Psophis was said to have been originally called Erymanthus, and its territory to have been ravaged by the Erymanthian Boar. It afterwards received the name of Phegia or Phegeia (Φηγία or Φήγεια), apparently from the oaks (Gr. phegoi, φηγοί) which at least up until the 19th century could still be found upon the site of the town. The ancients, as usual, derived the name from an eponymous founder, Phegeus.

The city was said to have been renamed "Psophis" by Echephron and Promachus, two sons of Heracles, who are said to have come from Sicily, and who named the town after their mother, Psophis.

The city, while still called "Phegia", was celebrated as the residence of Alcmaeon, who fled here from Argos after murdering his mother. Here Alcmaeon married Arsinoe or Alphesiboea in some versions), daughter of Phegeus. In consequence of their connection with Alcmaeon, the Psophidians took part in the second expedition against Thebes, and refused to join the other Greeks in the Trojan War.

== History ==
Psophis is rarely mentioned in history. In 219 BC, it was in the possession of the Eleians, and was taken by Philip V of Macedon, who was then in alliance with the Achaeans. In narrating this event, Polybius gives a detailed description of the town:

Psophis ... is situated in the central parts of the Peloponnese, in the western corner of Arcadia, and adjoining the Achaeans dwelling furthest towards the west. Philip marched thither in three days from Caphyae, and camped upon the hills opposite the city. When [he] observed the strength of the place, he was at a loss. On the western side of the town there is a rapid torrent, impassable during the greater part of the winter, and which ... makes the city exceedingly strong and inaccessible. On the eastern side flows the Erymanthus, a large and impetuous river. As the western torrent joins the Erymanthus on the southern side of the city, its three sides are surrounded by rivers, and rendered secure. On the remaining side towards the north, a strong hill hangs over, surrounded by a wall, and serving the purpose of a well-placed citadel. The town itself also is provided with walls, remarkable for their size and construction.

About 300 feet below the junction of the two rivers the united stream is joined by a third, smaller river, called the Lopesi, or Skupi, which rises on the frontiers of Cleitor near Seirae. From these three rivers the place is now called Tripotama. The banks of the Erymanthus are precipitous, but not very high; and between them and the steep summit of the hill upon which the town stood there is a small space of level or gently-rising ground. The summit is a sharp ridge, sending forth two roots, one of which descends nearly to the angle of junction of the two streams, the other almost to the bank of the Erymanthus at the eastern extremity of the city.

Philip, in his attack on Psophis, crossed the bridge over the Erymanthus, and then drew up his men in the narrow space between the river and the walls. While the Macedonians were attempting to scale the walls in three separate parties, the Eleians made a sally from the gate in the upper part of the town. Euripidas and the garrison then retreated into the Citadel of Zakynthos, and shortly afterwards surrendered to Philip.

== Ruins ==
In the 2nd century, Pausanias saw at Psophis a ruined temple of Aphrodite Erycina, heroa of Echephron and Promachus, the tomb of Alcmaeon, and near the Erymanthus a temple sacred to that stream. In the early 19th century, William Martin Leake also noticed a part of a theatre unmentioned by Pausanias, on the side of a hill. Nine hundred feet upstream from the junction of the two rivers, and near the walls on the bank of the Erymanthus, Leake also found some remains of a public building, 96 feet in length, below which there is a source of water in the bank. He conjectured that they may be the remains of the temple of Erymanthus.

Psophis was about two miles in circumference. The town walls followed the crest of the ridge to the north, and the bank above the two rivers on the opposite side; and at least up through the 19th century they were traceable nearly throughout the entire circuit of the place. On the north-eastern side of the town, which is the only part not protected by the two rivers or by the precipices at the back of the hill, there was a double enclosure surrounding the citadel, although this has since entirely disappeared.

At a distance of 30 stadia (roughly 3.4 miles) from Psophis was the Seirai (Σείραι), which Pausanias describes as the boundary of the Psophians and the Clitorians. On the road from Psophis to Thelpusa lay Tropaea, upon the left bank of the Ladon River, near which was the grove Aphrodisium, after which came a column with an ancient inscription upon it, marking the boundaries of Psophis and Thelpusa.

== Notable residents ==
Aglaus, a peasant found in mythology, was from Psophis.
