= Phorbus (mythology) =

In Greek mythology, Phorbus (/ˈfɔːrbəs/; Ancient Greek: Φόρβος Phórbos) father of Pronoe, wife of Aetolus, the founder of Aetolia. Through his daughter, he was grandfather of Pleuron and Calydon, and thus, the ancestor of the Calydonian royal family with notable members including: Oeneus, Althaea, Leda, Deianira and Meleager

== Genealogical tree ==
Family of Phorbus (mythology)

Dorus	Aetolus	Pronoe	Amythaon
Xanthippe	Pleuron	Calydon	Aeolia
Sterope	Stratonice	Laophonte	Agenor	Epicaste	Cleoboea	Protogeneia	Ares
Euryte	Porthaon	Demonice	Thestius	Eurythemis	Oxylus
Oeneus	Althaea	Toxeus	Evippus	Plexippus	Eurypylus	Leda
Periphas	Toxeus	Deianira	Gorge	Perimede	Phoenix	Oecles	Hypermnestra
Clymenus	Melanippe	Thoas	Astypalaea	Poseidon	Polyboea	Iphianeira	Amphiaraus
Methone	Agelaus	Ancaeus	Eurypylus	Clytie
Thyreus	Eurymede	Heracles	Chalciope
Meleager	Thessalus

== See also ==
- Phorbas
