= Ancaeus (son of Poseidon) =

Greek mythological figure

In Greek mythology, Ancaeus (/ænˈsiːəs/; Ancient Greek: Ἀγκαῖος, romanized: Ankaîos, lit. 'curved', 'bent' or 'holding in the arms') was king of the island of Samos, and an Argonaut: helmsmanship was his special skill.

== Family ==
Ancaeus was a son of Poseidon and Astypalaea, and brother of Eurypylus. In some sources, his mother was Althaea, daughter of Thestius. By other accounts his father was the Lelegian king Altes, which accords well with Ancaeus's rule over the Leleges of Samos.

According to a lost epic of his house, sung by the Samian poet Asios, he married Samia, daughter of the river god Maeander, who bore him Perilaus, Enudus, Samus, Alitherses, and Parthenope, the mother of Lycomedes.

== Mythology ==
The most famous story surrounding this Ancaeus is the following: when planting a vineyard, for Samos was famed for its wine, he was told by a seer that he would never taste its wine. Ancaeus then joined the voyage of the Argonauts, and returned home safely, by which time the grapes were ripe and had been made into wine. He summoned the seer before him, and raised a cup of his own wine to his lips, and was ready to taste it for the first time. He then mocked the seer, who retorted, "There is many a slip between the cup and the lip" (Πολλὰ μεταξὺ πέλει κύλικος καὶ χείλεος ἄκρου). Before Ancaeus had tasted the wine, an alarm was raised that a wild boar was ravaging the vineyard, and on hearing this, Ancaeus dropped the cup and went out to investigate – and was promptly killed by the boar.

== Calydonian family tree ==
Calydonian dynasty

Dorus	Aetolus	Pronoe	Amythaon
Xanthippe	Pleuron	Calydon	Aeolia
Sterope	Stratonice	Laophonte	Agenor	Epicaste	Cleoboea	Protogeneia	Ares
Euryte	Porthaon	Demonice	Thestius	Eurythemis	Oxylus
Oeneus	Althaea	Toxeus	Evippus	Plexippus	Eurypylus	Leda
Periphas	Toxeus	Deianira	Gorge	Perimede	Phoenix	Oecles	Hypermnestra
Clymenus	Melanippe	Thoas	Astypalaea	Poseidon	Polyboea	Iphianeira	Amphiaraus
Methone	Agelaus	Ancaeus	Eurypylus	Clytie
Thyreus	Eurymede	Heracles	Chalciope
Meleager	Thessalus
