= Eurypylus of Cos =

King of Cos in Greek mythology

In Greek mythology, Eurypylus /jʊəˈrɪpɪləs/ (Ancient Greek: Εὐρύπυλος, romanized: Eurupulos, lit. 'wide-gated') was a king of the island of Cos.

== Family ==
Eurypylus was the son of Poseidon and Astypalaea or Mestra. He was the husband of Clytie and father of Chalciope, Chalcon and Antagoras.

== Mythology ==
Heracles landed on Cos to escape a storm sent upon him by Hera, but the Coans took him for a pirate and attacked him; in a battle that ensued, Eurypylus was killed by Heracles. In another version, Heracles planned the attack on Cos because he liked Eurypylus' daughter Chalciope and intended to abduct her. Chalciope is indeed known as the mother of Heracles's son Thessalus.

== Calydonian family tree ==
Family of Eurypylus of Cos

Dorus	Aetolus	Pronoe	Amythaon
Xanthippe	Pleuron	Calydon	Aeolia
Sterope	Stratonice	Laophonte	Agenor	Epicaste	Cleoboea	Protogeneia	Ares
Euryte	Porthaon	Demonice	Thestius	Eurythemis	Oxylus
Oeneus	Althaea	Toxeus	Evippus	Plexippus	Eurypylus	Leda
Periphas	Toxeus	Deianira	Gorge	Perimede	Phoenix	Oecles	Hypermnestra
Clymenus	Melanippe	Thoas	Astypalaea	Poseidon	Polyboea	Iphianeira	Amphiaraus
Methone	Agelaus	Ancaeus	Eurypylus	Clytie
Thyreus	Eurymede	Heracles	Chalciope
Meleager	Thessalus
