= Pleuron (son of Aetolus) =

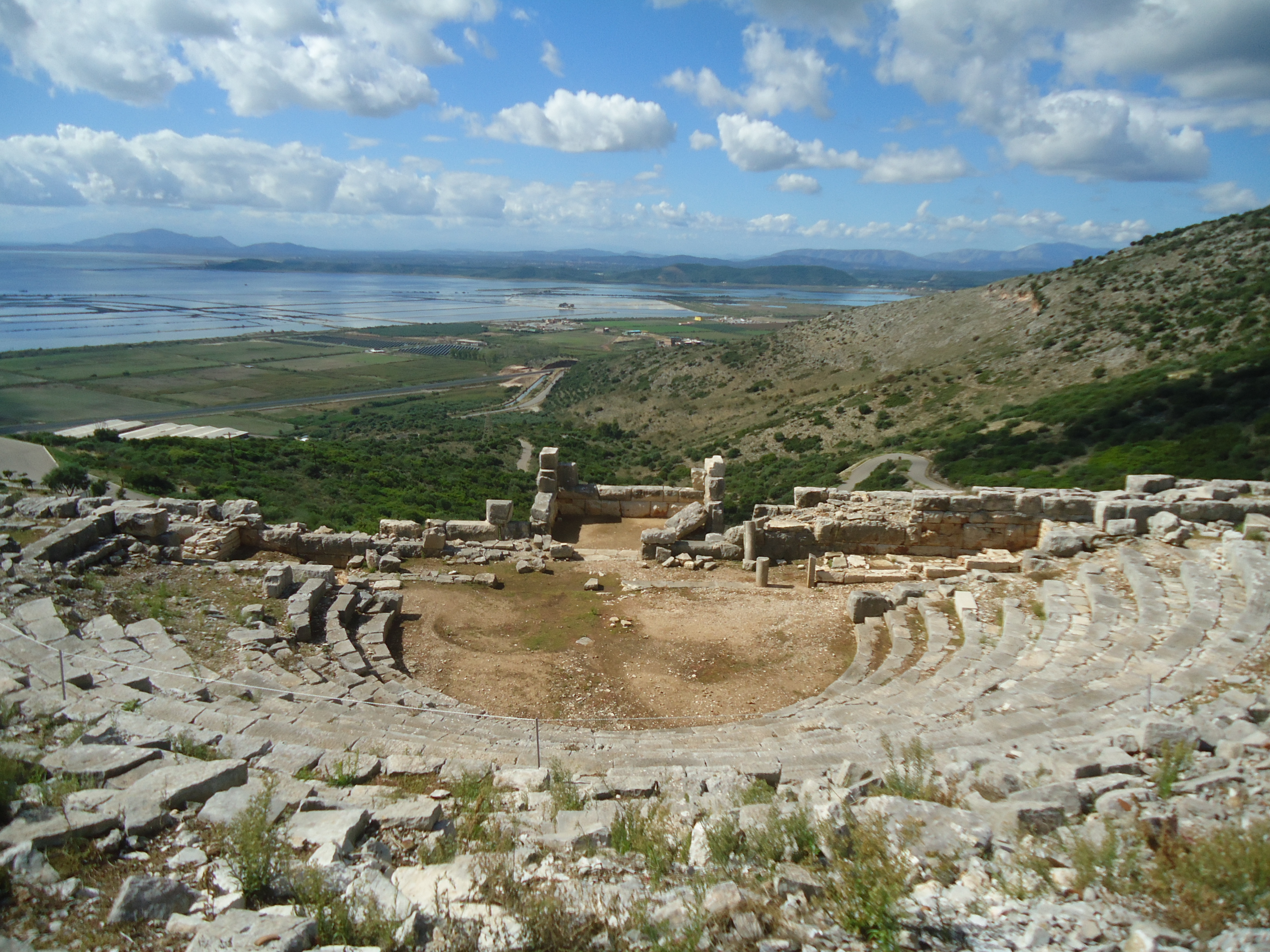
Ancient theater of Plueron

In Greek mythology, Pleuron (Ancient Greek: Πλευρῶνος) was a son of Aetolus and Pronoe, daughter of Phorbus, and brother of Calydon. He was married to Xanthippe, daughter of Dorus, by whom he became the father of Agenor, Sterope, Stratonice, and Laophonte. Pleuron was said to have founded the town of Pleuron in Aetolia (and apparently was its eponym), but he had also a heroon at Sparta, erected by his great-granddaughter, Queen Leda.

== Family tree ==
Calydonian dynasty

Dorus	Aetolus	Pronoe	Amythaon
Xanthippe	Pleuron	Calydon	Aeolia
Sterope	Stratonice	Laophonte	Agenor	Epicaste	Cleoboea	Protogeneia	Ares
Euryte	Porthaon	Demonice	Thestius	Eurythemis	Oxylus
Oeneus	Althaea	Toxeus	Evippus	Plexippus	Eurypylus	Leda
Periphas	Toxeus	Deianira	Gorge	Perimede	Phoenix	Oecles	Hypermnestra
Clymenus	Melanippe	Thoas	Astypalaea	Poseidon	Polyboea	Iphianeira	Amphiaraus
Methone	Agelaus	Ancaeus	Eurypylus	Clytie
Thyreus	Eurymede	Heracles	Chalciope
Meleager	Thessalus
