= Porthaon =

Figure from Greek mythology

In Greek mythology, Porthaon (Ancient Greek: Πορθάων, genitive Πορθάονος), sometimes referred to as Parthaon or Portheus, was a king of Calydon and son of Agenor or Ares by Epicaste and thus brother of Demonice (also known as Demodice) and possibly Thestius.

== Family ==
Porthaon was the husband of Euryte, daughter of Hippodamas, who became the mother of his children, Oeneus, Agrius, Alcathous, Melas, Leucopeus and Sterope. In some account, his wife Laothoe bore him three daughters, Sterope, Eurythemiste and Stratonice. By an unnamed servant, Porthaon was the father of the Argonaut Laocoön. Dia, the consort of his son Agrius was also called his daughter.

== Genealogical tree ==
Calydonian dynasty

Dorus	Aetolus	Pronoe	Amythaon
Xanthippe	Pleuron	Calydon	Aeolia
Sterope	Stratonice	Laophonte	Agenor	Epicaste	Cleoboea	Protogeneia	Ares
Euryte	Porthaon	Demonice	Thestius	Eurythemis	Oxylus
Oeneus	Althaea	Toxeus	Evippus	Plexippus	Eurypylus	Leda
Periphas	Toxeus	Deianira	Gorge	Perimede	Phoenix	Oecles	Hypermnestra
Clymenus	Melanippe	Thoas	Astypalaea	Poseidon	Polyboea	Iphianeira	Amphiaraus
Methone	Agelaus	Ancaeus	Eurypylus	Clytie
Thyreus	Eurymede	Heracles	Chalciope
Meleager	Thessalus
