= Althaea (mythology) =

Character in Greek mythology

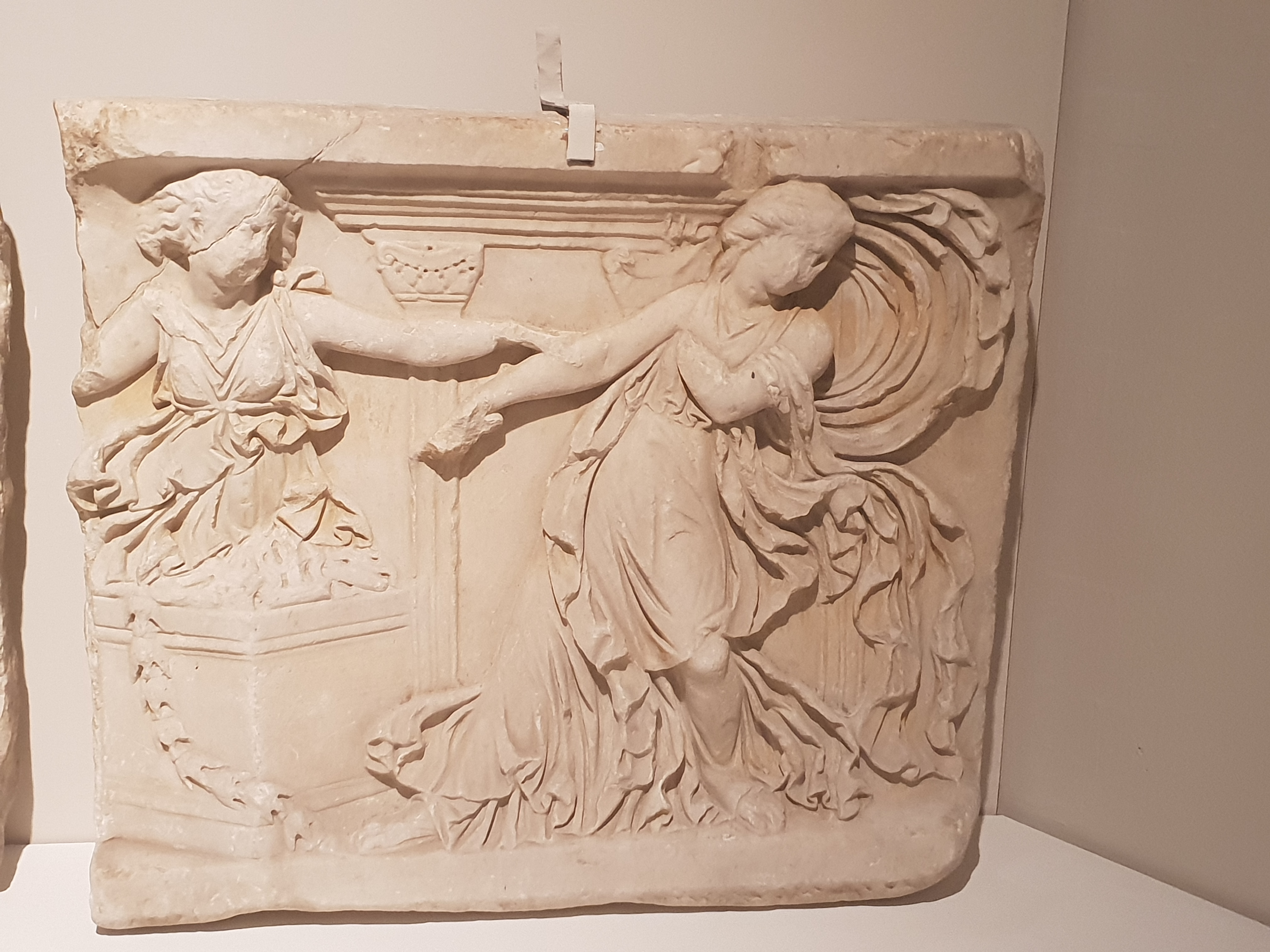
Althaea kills Meleager, side relief on a Roman marble sarcophagus, 2nd century.

In Greek mythology, Althaea (/ælˈθiːə/; Ancient Greek: Ἀλθαία, romanized: Althaía, lit. 'healer'), also rendered Althea or Althaia, was queen of Calydon through her marriage to King Oeneus. Althaea appears in myths surrounding the fabled Calydonian boar hunt, and is infamous for murdering her son Meleager.

== Family ==
Althaea was the daughter of King Thestius of Aetolia, son of Ares. She was therefore a Pleuronian princess. Her mother may have been Leucippe or Eurythemis, daughter of Cleoboea. She had two sisters: Leda and Hypermnestra, and four brothers: Iphiclus, Plexippus, Eurypylus, and Evippus. Toxeus has also been named as Althaea's brother. Through her sister Leda, Althaea was the aunt of Helen of Troy, Clytemnestra, and Castor and Pollux.

Althaea married Oeneus, king of Calydon. Together they had sons Meleager, Toxeus, Thyreus, Pheres, Clymenus, Agelaus, Periphas and daughters Deianeira, Gorge, Melanippe and Eurymede. According to some accounts, Meleager was the result of a liaison with Ares and Ancaeus was named as her son by the god Poseidon. Likewise, Deianeira was sometimes described as the daughter of Dionysus; Hyginus wrote that the affair was carried out with Oeneus' permission and knowledge, and as a reward, Dionysus taught him how to cultivate grapes.

== Mythology ==
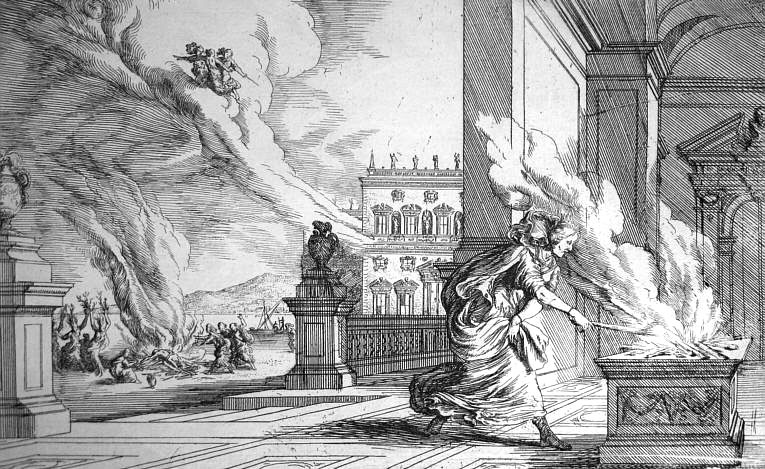
Althaea casts the brand of Meleager into the fire, illustration by Johann Wilhelm Baur.

Seven days after Althaea gave birth to Meleager, the Moirai Clotho, Lachesis, and Atropos appeared to her. They told Althaea that her son's life was bound to that of a log (brand) burning in the family hearth; he would only live as long as the brand was unconsumed by fire. Althaea removed the brand from the hearth and buried it in the palace or placed it in a chest.

Meleager grew to be a noble prince, well-respected by his peers. One spring, when Oeneus was sacrificing the first fruits of the season to the gods, he accidentally omitted Artemis, goddess of the hunt. Enraged by the slight, Artemis unleashed a massive, ferocious boar on Calydon. The animal rampaged across the countryside destroying crops, killing any person it came across, and forcing people to take shelter within the city walls. Oeneus gathered together a group of warriors to kill the boar, including Meleager, the famous huntress Atalanta, and a few of Althaea's brothers, potentially Plexippus and Toxeus. Meleager dealt the killing strike to the boar, but gave the skin to Atalanta both because he had fallen in love with her and because she had landed the first and many subsequent blows onto the animal. However, Meleager's uncles were outraged that Meleager would give the prize to a woman and non-family member. They forcefully took the skin from Atalanta, and Meleager retaliated by killing them both.

When Althaea learned what had happened, she was distraught and enraged. She took the brand from where she had concealed it and threw it onto the hearth, killing her son. However, she was unable to withstand her grief, and afterwards committed suicide by hanging or stabbing herself. All of Meleager's sisters besides Gorge and Deianira mourned continuously at Meleager's tomb until Artemis transformed them into birds and moved them to the island of Leros, where they were called the Meleagrids.

Alternately, some authors claim that there was no brand. Instead, they write that Althaea killed her son by cursing him; the gods granted her wishes for vengeance and killed him. Additionally, Homer's version of the story in the Iliad differs significantly from other accounts. He writes that a war broke out between the Curetes and the Calydonians after the hunt ended, during which Meleager killed many of Althaea's brothers. Althaea was struck with grief, and prayed to Hades and Persephone for revenge; Meleager then fell in battle, potentially due to the interference of the Erinyes. After his death, Althaea and Meleager's wife Cleopatra hanged themselves.

== Family tree ==
Calydonian dynasty

Dorus	Aetolus	Pronoe	Amythaon
Xanthippe	Pleuron	Calydon	Aeolia
Sterope	Stratonice	Laophonte	Agenor	Epicaste	Cleoboea	Protogeneia	Ares
Euryte	Porthaon	Demonice	Thestius	Eurythemis	Oxylus
Oeneus	Althaea	Toxeus	Evippus	Plexippus	Eurypylus	Leda
Periphas	Toxeus	Deianira	Gorge	Perimede	Phoenix	Oecles	Hypermnestra
Clymenus	Melanippe	Thoas	Astypalaea	Poseidon	Polyboea	Iphianeira	Amphiaraus
Methone	Agelaus	Ancaeus	Eurypylus	Clytie
Thyreus	Eurymede	Heracles	Chalciope
Meleager	Thessalus
