= Agenor (son of Pleuron) =

Ancient Greek mythological figure

In Greek mythology, Agenor (/əˈdʒiːnɔːr/; Ancient Greek: Ἀγήνωρ or Αγήνορι, romanized: Agēnor, lit. 'heroic, manly') was a son of King Pleuron of Aetolia and Xanthippe, and grandson of Aetolus. His siblings were Stratonice, Sterope and Laophonte. Agenor married his cousin Epicaste, the daughter of Calydon, who became by him the mother of Porthaon and Demonice. According to Pausanias, Thestius, the father of Leda, was likewise a son of this Agenor.

== Genealogical tree ==
Family of Agenor (son of Pleuron)

Dorus | Aetolus | Pronoe | Amythaon
Xanthippe | Pleuron | Calydon | Aeolia
Sterope | Stratonice | Laophonte | Agenor | Epicaste | Cleoboea | Protogeneia | Ares
Euryte | Porthaon | Demonice | Thestius | Eurythemis | Oxylus
Oeneus | Althaea | Toxeus | Evippus | Plexippus | Eurypylus | Leda
Periphas | Toxeus | Deianira | Gorge | Perimede | Phoenix | Oecles | Hypermnestra
Clymenus | Melanippe | Thoas | Astypalaea | Poseidon | Polyboea | Iphianeira | Amphiaraus
Methone | Agelaus | Ancaeus | Eurypylus | Clytie
Thyreus | Eurymede | Heracles | Chalciope
Meleager | Thessalus
