= Aetolus (son of Endymion) =

Ancient Greek mythological figure

Aetolus (/iːˈtoʊləs/; Ancient Greek: Αἰτωλός, romanized: Aitolos) was, in Greek mythology, a son of Endymion, great-great-grandson of Deucalion, and a Naiad nymph (Neis), or Iphianassa.

== Family ==
According to Pausanias, Aetolus' mother was called Asterodia, Chromia, or Hyperippe. He was married to Pronoe, by whom he had two sons, Pleuron and Calydon. His brothers were Paeon, Epeius, Eurycyda, and Naxos. In one account, Aetolus was the son of Protogenia by Zeus and the brother of Aethlius, Opus and possibly Dorus. Other sources also described Aetolus as the son of Amphictyon and father of Physcius, the father of Locrus. In this account, Aetolus was a king of Locris after his father Amphictyon. Then, the kingdom was passed on to Physcus and eventually Locrus who name the land after himself.

== Mythology ==
Aetolus' father compelled him and his two brothers Paeon and Epeius to decide by a contest at Olympia as to which of them was to succeed him in his kingdom of Elis. Epeius gained the victory, and occupied the throne after his father, and on his demise he was succeeded by Aetolus. During the funeral games which were celebrated in honor of Azan, he ran with his chariot over Apis, the son of Jason or Salmoneus, and killed him, whereupon he was expelled by the sons of Apis. The kingdom then passed to Eleius, son of his sister Eurycyda. After leaving Peloponnesus, he went to the country of the Curetes, between the Achelous and the Corinthian gulf, where he slew Dorus, Laodocus, and Polypoetes, the sons of Apollo and Phthia, and gave to the country the name of Aetolia. This story is only a mythical account of the colonization of Aetolia.

== Genealogical tree ==
Calydonian dynasty

Dorus	Aetolus	Pronoe	Amythaon
Xanthippe	Pleuron	Calydon	Aeolia
Sterope	Stratonice	Laophonte	Agenor	Epicaste	Cleoboea	Protogeneia	Ares
Euryte	Porthaon	Demonice	Thestius	Eurythemis	Oxylus
Oeneus	Althaea	Toxeus	Evippus	Plexippus	Eurypylus	Leda
Periphas	Toxeus	Deianira	Gorge	Perimede	Phoenix	Oecles	Hypermnestra
Clymenus	Melanippe	Thoas	Astypalaea	Poseidon	Polyboea	Iphianeira	Amphiaraus
Methone	Agelaus	Ancaeus	Eurypylus	Clytie
Thyreus	Eurymede	Heracles	Chalciope
Meleager	Thessalus
