= Calydon of Aetolia =

Mythological Greek ruler

In Greek mythology, Calydon (/ˈkælɪdɒn/; Ancient Greek: Καλυδὼν) was the eponymous ruler of Calydon, a city in Aetolia.

== Family ==
Calydon was a son of King Aetolus and Pronoe, daughter of Phorbus, and the brother of Pleuron. He married Aeolia, daughter of Amythaon, and had by her two daughters: Protogeneia, who consorted with Ares, and Epicaste, who wed her cousin Agenor.

== Family tree ==
Family of Calydon of Aetolia

Dorus	Aetolus	Pronoe	Amythaon
Xanthippe	Pleuron	Calydon	Aeolia
Sterope	Stratonice	Laophonte	Agenor	Epicaste	Cleoboea	Protogeneia	Ares
Euryte	Porthaon	Demonice	Thestius	Eurythemis	Oxylus
Oeneus	Althaea	Toxeus	Evippus	Plexippus	Eurypylus	Leda
Periphas	Toxeus	Deianira	Gorge	Perimede	Phoenix	Oecles	Hypermnestra
Clymenus	Melanippe	Thoas	Astypalaea	Poseidon	Polyboea	Iphianeira	Amphiaraus
Methone	Agelaus	Ancaeus	Eurypylus	Clytie
Thyreus	Eurymede	Heracles	Chalciope
Meleager	Thessalus
