= Oeneus =

Ancient Greek mythical king

- Member of the Royal House of Calydon
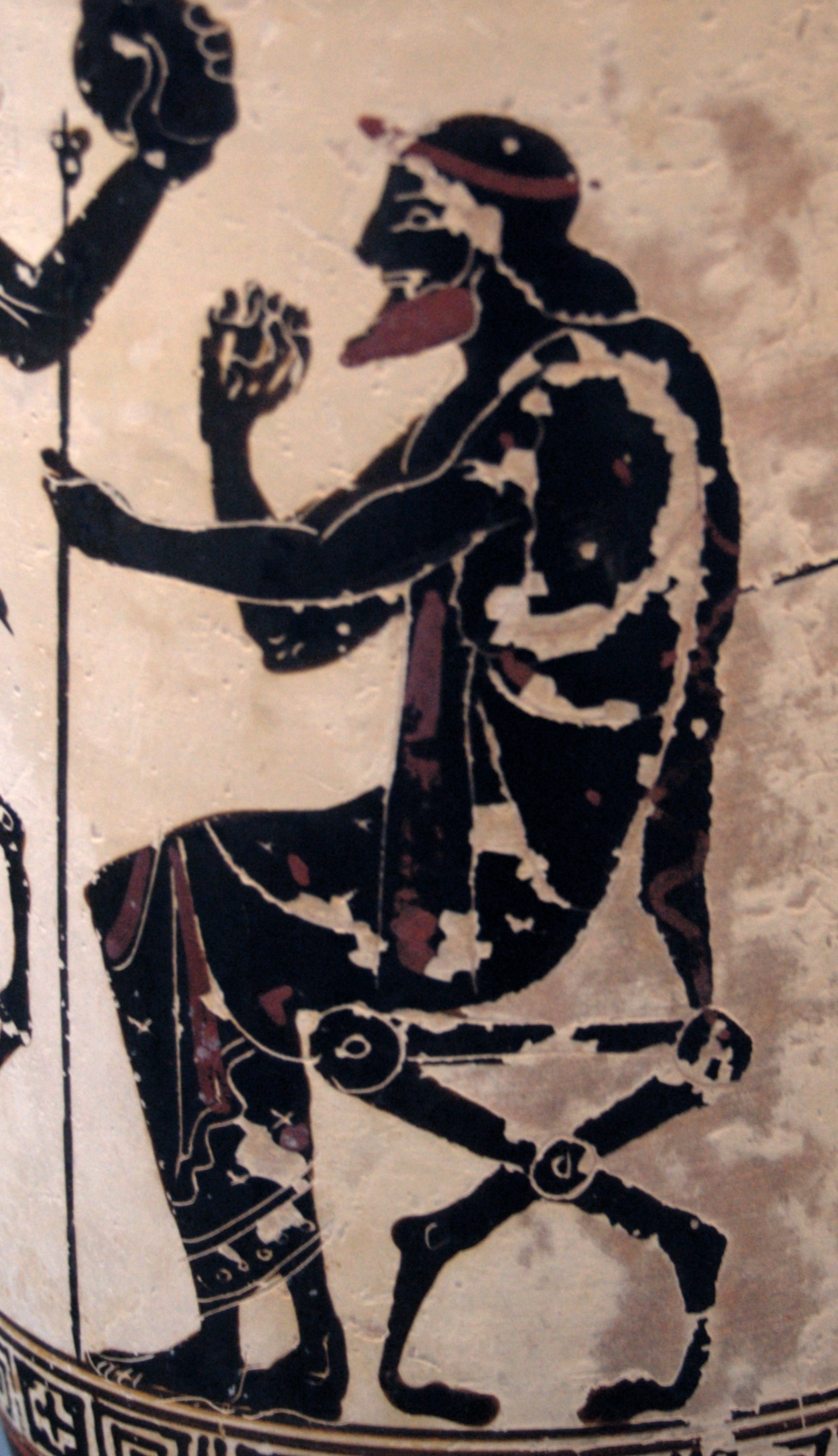
- Oeneus with coat and sceptre, Attic white-ground lekythos, c. 500 BC, Staatliche Antikensammlungen (Inv. 1905)
- Predecessor: Porthaon, his father
- Successor: Agrius, his brother
- Abode: Calydon in Aetolia

Genealogy
- Parents: Porthaon and Euryte
- Siblings: Agrius, Alcathous, Melas, Leucopeus and Sterope, Laocoon
- Consort: Althaea
- Offspring: Meleager, Toxeus, Clymenus, Periphas, Agelaus, Thyreus, Gorge, Eurymede, Mothone, Perimede, Melanippe, Deianira, Tydeus, Ochesius

In Greek mythology, Oeneus (/ˈiː.niː.əs/; Ancient Greek: Οἰνεύς, romanized: Oineús, lit. 'Wine-man') was a Calydonian king. He was the first who received a vine-plant from Dionysos.

== Family ==
Oeneus was the son of King Porthaon and Euryte, and thus, brother of Agrius, Alcathous, Melas, Leucopeus, and Sterope. He married Althaea and became the father of Deianeira, Meleager, Toxeus, Clymenus, Periphas, Agelaus (or Ageleus), Thyreus (or Phereus or Pheres), Gorge, Eurymede, Melanippe and Perimede (although Meleager's and Deianeira's fathers could also have been Ares and Dionysus respectively). see Meleagrids.

Oeneus was also the father of Tydeus and possibly Melanippus or Olenias by Periboea, daughter of Hipponous, though Tydeus was exiled from Aetolia and appears in myths concerning Argos. According to Pausanias, Mothone was a daughter of Oeneus by a concubine. In some accounts, Polyxo was called the sister of Meleager and thus, can be counted among the daughters of Oeneus. Nicander's lost Aetolica also made Oeneus the father of Ochesius, himself father of the Aetolian warrior Periphas, slain in the Trojan War by Ares.

Comparative table of Oeneus' family
Relation	Names	Sources									
Relation	Names	Sch. on Hom.	Hesiod	Apollodorus		Hyginus		Pausanias			Antoninus
Parents	Porthaon and Euryte			✓							
Parents	Parthaon or					✓					
Parents	Porthaon or		✓					✓			
Parents	Portheus										✓
Siblings	Agrius			✓		✓					
Siblings	Alcathous			✓				✓			
Siblings	Melas			✓							
Siblings	Leucopeus			✓							
Siblings	Sterope			✓							
Consort	Althaea		✓	✓		✓		✓			✓
Consort	Periboea				✓		✓				
Consort	Gorge				✓						
Consort	a concubine								✓		
Consort	unnamed woman									✓	
Children	Polyxo	✓									
Children	Toxeus		✓	✓							✓
Children	Pheres or		✓								
Children	Thyreus or			✓							
Children	Phereus										✓
Children	Agelaus or		✓								
Children	Ageleos										✓
Children	Clymenus		✓	✓							✓
Children	Periphas		✓								✓
Children	Gorge		✓	✓						✓	✓
Children	Deianira		✓	✓		✓		✓			✓
Children	Meleager		✓	✓		✓		✓			✓
Children	Tydeus						✓			✓	
Children	Melanippus or						✓				
Children	Olenias				✓						
Children	Ochesius	✓									
Children	Mothone								✓		
Children	Perimede									✓	
Children	Eurymede										✓
Children	Melanippe										✓

== Mythology ==
Oeneus slew his son Toxeus by his own hand because he leaped over the ditch. In Book VI of the Iliad, Oeneus once hosted the hero Bellerophon, as described by his grandson Diomedes.

=== Divine visit ===
When Dionysus had come as a guest to Oeneus he fell in love with Althaea and the king realizing this, he voluntarily left the city and pretended to be performing sacred rites. But Dionysus lay with Althaea, who became mother of Dejanira. To Oeneus, because of his generous hospitality, he gave the vine as a gift, and showed him how to plant it, and decreed that its fruit should be called oinos from the name of his host. In another tale, his goatherd Staphylus discovered some grapes, and after Oeneus tasted their juice, named the wine after himself and the grape after Staphylus, or he offered the wine to Dionysus and he honoured the two men by giving their names to the fruit and the juice.

=== Calydonian boar hunt ===
Since Oeneus had made sacrifices yearly to all the gods during the harvest ceremonies, but had omitted to honor Artemis, in anger she sent a boar of immense size to lay waste the district of Calydon. He sent out his son Meleager who promised that he would go with chosen leaders to attack the Calydonian boar. So began the Calydonian boar hunt during which the boar was killed by Atalanta and Meleager. However, an argument began as to who should take the boar's skin as a prize: Meleager gave it to Atalanta, but two of his maternal uncles, sons of Thestius, wanted the trophy for themselves, claiming that it belonged to them by the right of birth if Meleager did not want it. Meleager, in rage, killed them, which resulted in a war between the Calydonians and the Curetes, in which all of Oeneus' sons, including Meleager, fell.

=== Aftermath ===
When Hipponoüs of Olenus, angered at his daughter Periboea because she claimed that she was with child by Ares, sent her away into Aetolia to Oeneus with orders for him to do away with her at the first opportunity. Oeneus, however, who had recently lost son and wife, was unwilling to slay Periboea, but married her instead and begat a son Tydeus.

At some point, Oeneus harbored brothers Agamemnon and Menelaus after they had been usurped and driven out of Mycenae by Thyestes. They had been sent to him by Polypheides, lord of Sicyon.

The sons of Oeneus' brother Agrius deposed him but Diomedes, his grandson through Tydeus, put Oeneus back on the Calydonian throne (or the throne passed to Andraemon, husband of Gorge, due to Oeneus' old age). Oeneus either died of natural causes or was killed by the surviving sons of Agrius who laid an ambush against him while Diomedes was transporting him to Peloponessus. He was buried in Argos by Diomedes, and a town was named Oenoe after him.

== Family tree ==
Calydonian dynasty

Dorus	Aetolus	Pronoe	Amythaon
Xanthippe	Pleuron	Calydon	Aeolia
Sterope	Stratonice	Laophonte	Agenor	Epicaste	Cleoboea	Protogeneia	Ares
Euryte	Porthaon	Demonice	Thestius	Eurythemis	Oxylus
Oeneus	Althaea	Toxeus	Evippus	Plexippus	Eurypylus	Leda
Periphas	Toxeus	Deianira	Gorge	Perimede	Phoenix	Oecles	Hypermnestra
Clymenus	Melanippe	Thoas	Astypalaea	Poseidon	Polyboea	Iphianeira	Amphiaraus
Methone	Agelaus	Ancaeus	Eurypylus	Clytie
Thyreus	Eurymede	Heracles	Chalciope
Meleager	Thessalus
