= Hypermnestra (daughter of Thestius) =

In Greek mythology, Hypermnestra (Ancient Greek: Ὑπερμνήστρα, romanized: Hypermnēstra, lit. 'exceedingly memorable' or 'strong memory') was the daughter of King Thestius of Pleuron and Eurythemis, and the sister of Althaea, Leda, Iphiclus, Evippus, Plexippus, and Eurypylus.

Diodorus Siculus also mentions a figure named Hypmnestra, who he states is the daughter of Thespius, and the mother, by Oicles, of Amphiaraus (one of the Seven against Thebes), Polyboea, and Iphianeira.

== Calydonian Family Tree ==
Family of Hypermnestra (daughter of Thestius)

Dorus	Aetolus	Pronoe	Amythaon
Xanthippe	Pleuron	Calydon	Aeolia
Sterope	Stratonice	Laophonte	Agenor	Epicaste	Cleoboea	Protogeneia	Ares
Euryte	Porthaon	Demonice	Thestius	Eurythemis	Oxylus
Oeneus	Althaea	Toxeus	Evippus	Plexippus	Eurypylus	Leda
Periphas	Toxeus	Deianira	Gorge	Perimede	Phoenix	Oecles	Hypermnestra
Clymenus	Melanippe	Thoas	Astypalaea	Poseidon	Polyboea	Iphianeira	Amphiaraus
Methone	Agelaus	Ancaeus	Eurypylus	Clytie
Thyreus	Eurymede	Heracles	Chalciope
Meleager	Thessalus
