= Halicyrna =

Coordinates: 38°23′17″N 21°29′10″E

Halicyrna or Halikyrna (Ancient Greek: Ἁλίκυρνα) was a village of ancient Aetolia, described by Strabo as situated 30 stadia below Calydon towards the sea. Pliny the Elder places it near Pleuron.

Its site is located near the modern Khilia Spitia/Ag. Symeon.
