= Thestiae =

Coordinates: 38°39′21″N 21°29′06″E

Thestiae (Ancient Greek: Θεστιαί), sometimes wrongly named Thesteia or Thestia, conjectures based on the ethnonym Thestieus (Ancient Greek: Θεστιεύς) attested in Polybius, was a town in ancient Aetolia. The only literary source mentioning the city is Polybius, from whose narrative we learn that it was situated in the northern part of the upper plain of Aetolia. The name is perhaps connected with Thestius, one of the old Aetolian heroes.

Its site is located near the modern Ano Vlokhos.
