= Laocoön (mythology) =

In Greek mythology, Laocoön (/leɪˈɒkoʊˌɒn, -kəˌwɒn/; Ancient Greek: Λαοκόων, IPA: [laokóɔːn]) may refer to the following personages:

- Laocoön or Lacoon, one of the Argonauts and a bastard son of King Porthaon of Calydon by a servant woman and thus half-brother to Oeneus. Oeneus, now growing old, sent his brother Laocoon to guard his young son Meleager during their journey to Colchis.
- Laocoön, the Trojan priest of Poseidon.
