= Amythaonius =

Ancient Greek mythological figure

Amythaonius was in Ancient Greece a patronymic from Amythaon, by which his son, the seer Melampus, was sometimes called. The descendants of Amythaon in general were called by the Greeks Amythaonidae.
