= Hyleus =

Participant of the Calydonian boar hunt

A hunter identified as either Hyleus or Ancaeus fallen at the boar's feet on a 2nd-century Roman sarcophagus from Patras, Greece.

In Greek mythology, Hyleus (Ancient Greek: Ὑλεὺς, romanized: Huleús, lit. 'ringwood') was one of heroes who participated in the Calydonian boar hunt. While the hunters surrounded the brute and slew it, Hyleus as well as Ancaeus were unlucky, as they were both killed by it.
