= Calydonian boar hunt =

Defeat of a mythical boar by Olympian heroes

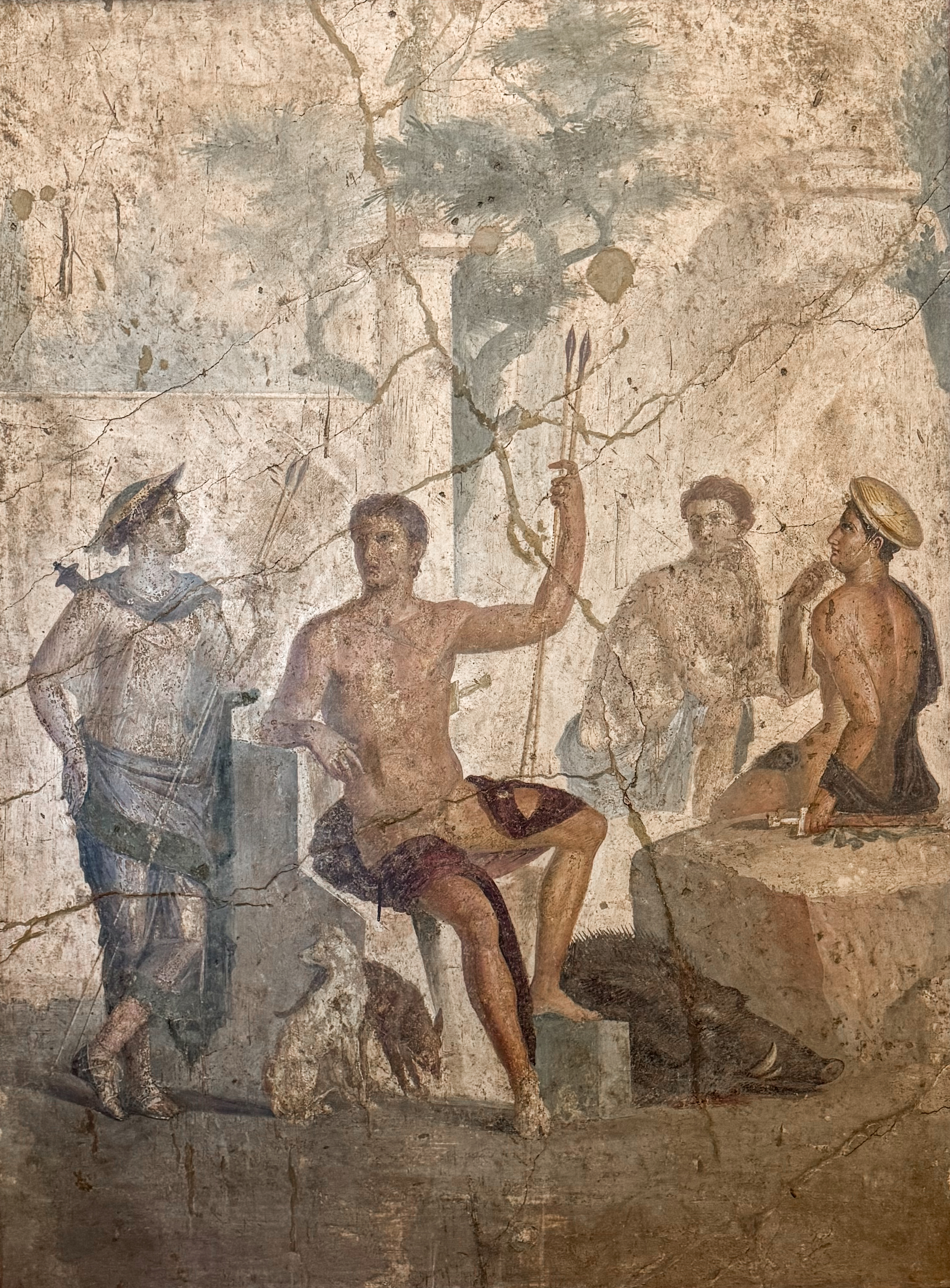
Fresco depicting Atalanta and Meleager resting after successfully hunting the Calydonian boar

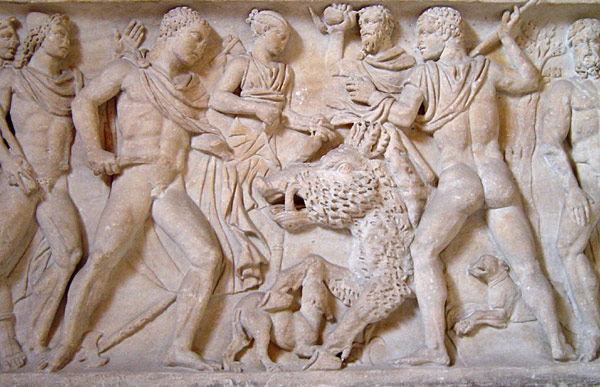
The Calydonian boar hunt shown on a Roman frieze (Ashmolean Museum, Oxford)

The Calydonian boar hunt is one of the great heroic adventures in Greek legend. It occurred in the generation prior to that of the Trojan War, and stands alongside the other great heroic adventure of that generation, the voyage of the Argonauts, which preceded it. The purpose of the hunt was to kill the Calydonian boar (also called the Aetolian boar), which had been sent by Artemis to ravage the region of Calydon in Aetolia, because its king Oeneus had failed to honour her in his rites to the gods. The hunters, led by the hero Meleager, included many of the foremost heroes of Greece. In most accounts it is also concluded that a great heroine, Atalanta, won its hide by first wounding it with an arrow. This outraged many of the men, leading to a tragic dispute.

== Importance in Greek mythology and art ==
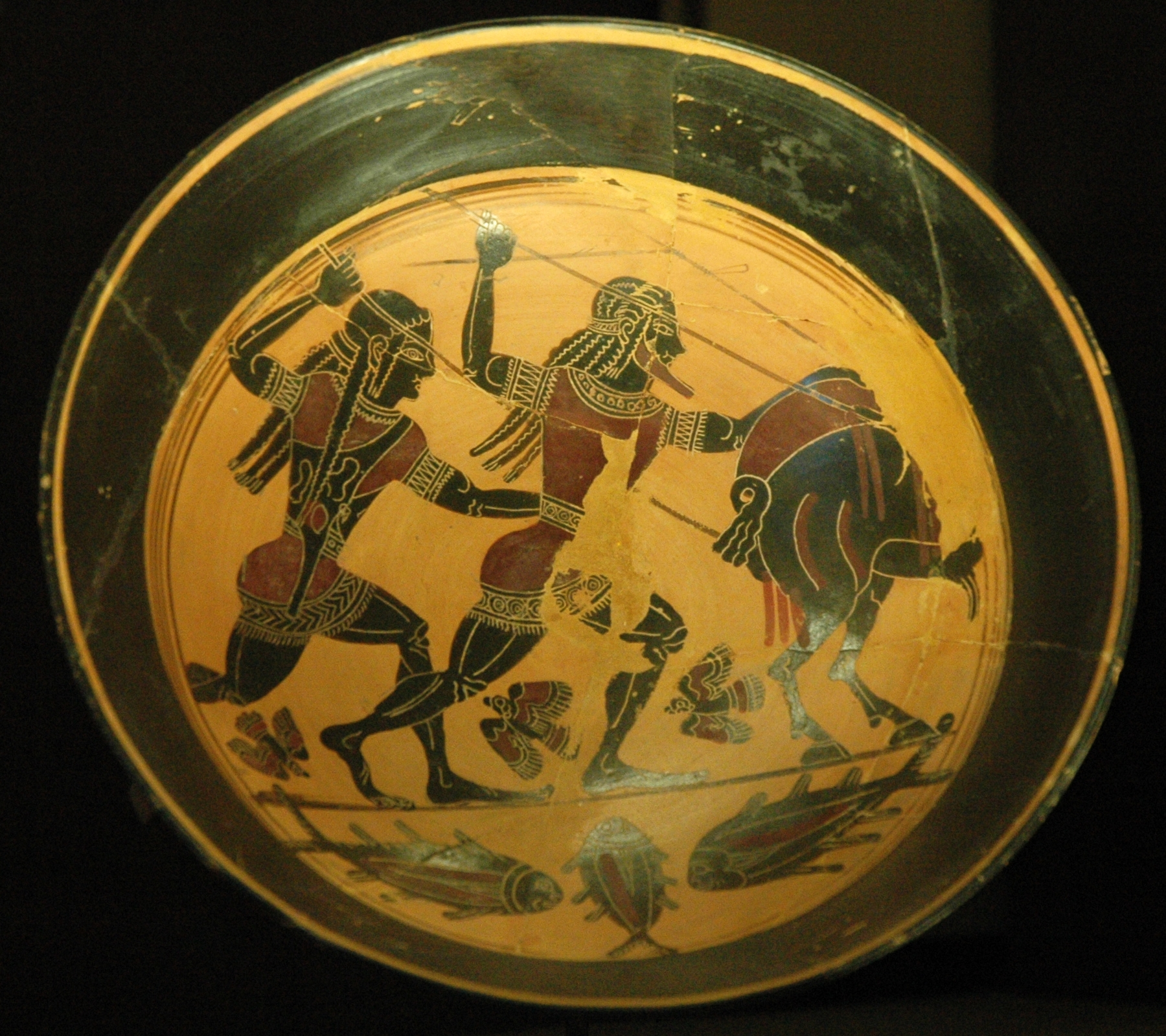
Tondo of a Laconian black-figure cup by the Naucratis Painter, c. 555 BCE (Louvre)

Since the Calydonian boar hunt drew together numerous heroes—among whom were many who were venerated as progenitors of their local ruling houses among tribal groups of Hellenes into Classical times—it offered a natural subject in classical art, for it was redolent with the web of myth that gathered around its protagonists on other occasions, around their half-divine descent and their offspring. Like the quest for the Golden Fleece (Argonautica) or the Trojan War that took place the following generation, the Calydonian boar hunt is one of the nodes in which much Greek myth comes together.

== Sources ==
Both Homer and Hesiod and their listeners were aware of the details of this myth, but no surviving complete account exists: some papyrus fragments found at Oxyrhynchus are all that survive of Stesichorus's telling; the myth repertory called Bibliotheke ("The Library") contains the gist of the tale, and before that was compiled the Roman poet Ovid told the story in some colorful detail in his Metamorphoses.

== Mythology ==
=== The Boar ===
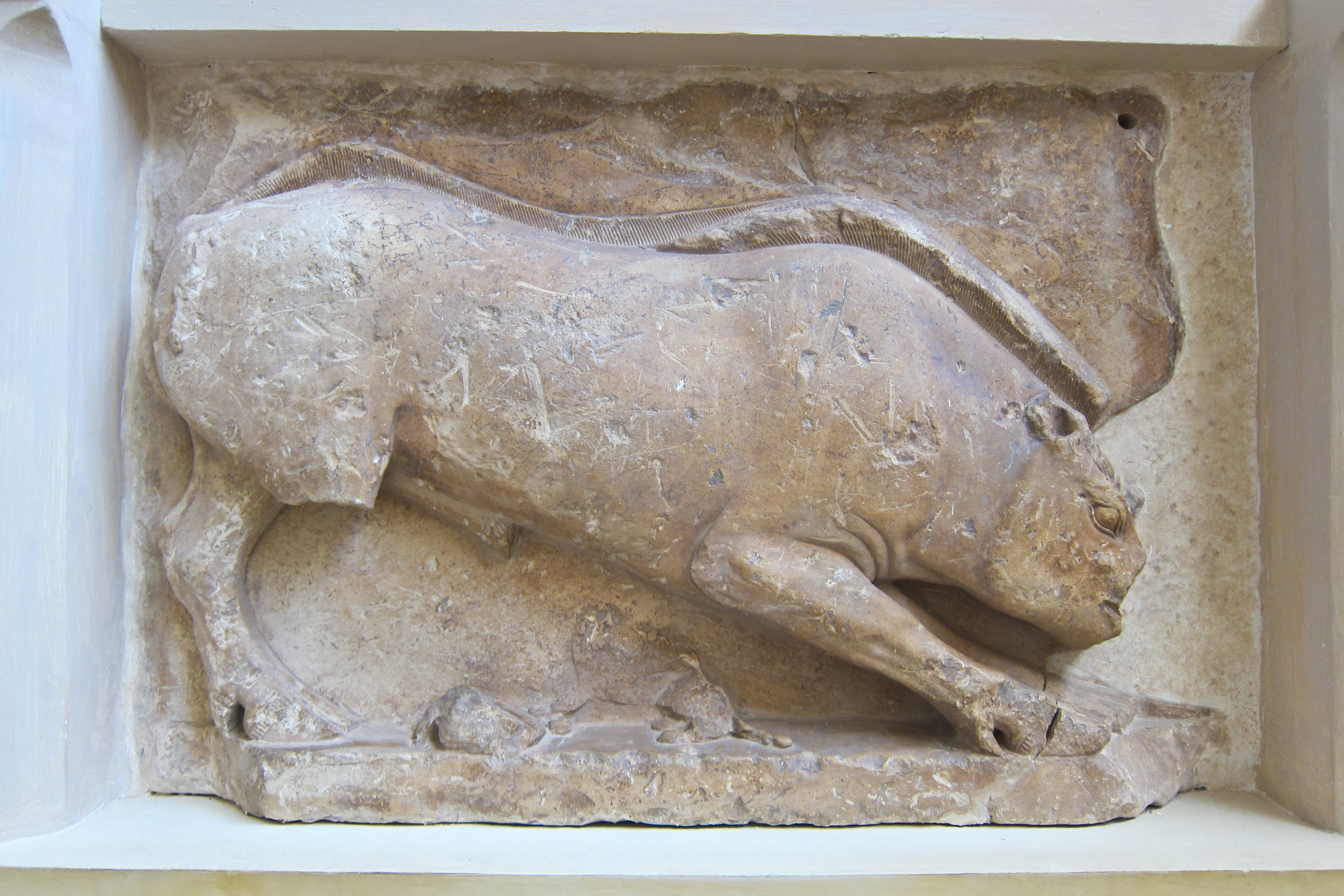
The Calydonian boar, metope fragment from the Sicyonian Treasury, Delphi Archaeological Museum, Delphi, Greece

The Calydonian boar is one of several monsters in Greek mythology named for a specific locale. Sent by Artemis to ravage the region of Calydon in Aetolia, it met its end in the Calydonian boar hunt, in which many of the great heroes of the age took part (an exception being Heracles, who vanquished his own Goddess-sent Erymanthian boar separately).

King Oeneus ("wine man") of Calydon, an ancient city of west-central Greece north of the Gulf of Patras, held annual harvest sacrifices to the gods on the sacred hill. One year the king forgot to include Great "Artemis of the golden throne" in his offerings. Insulted, Artemis, the "Lady of the Bow", loosed the biggest, most ferocious wild boar imaginable on the countryside of Calydon.

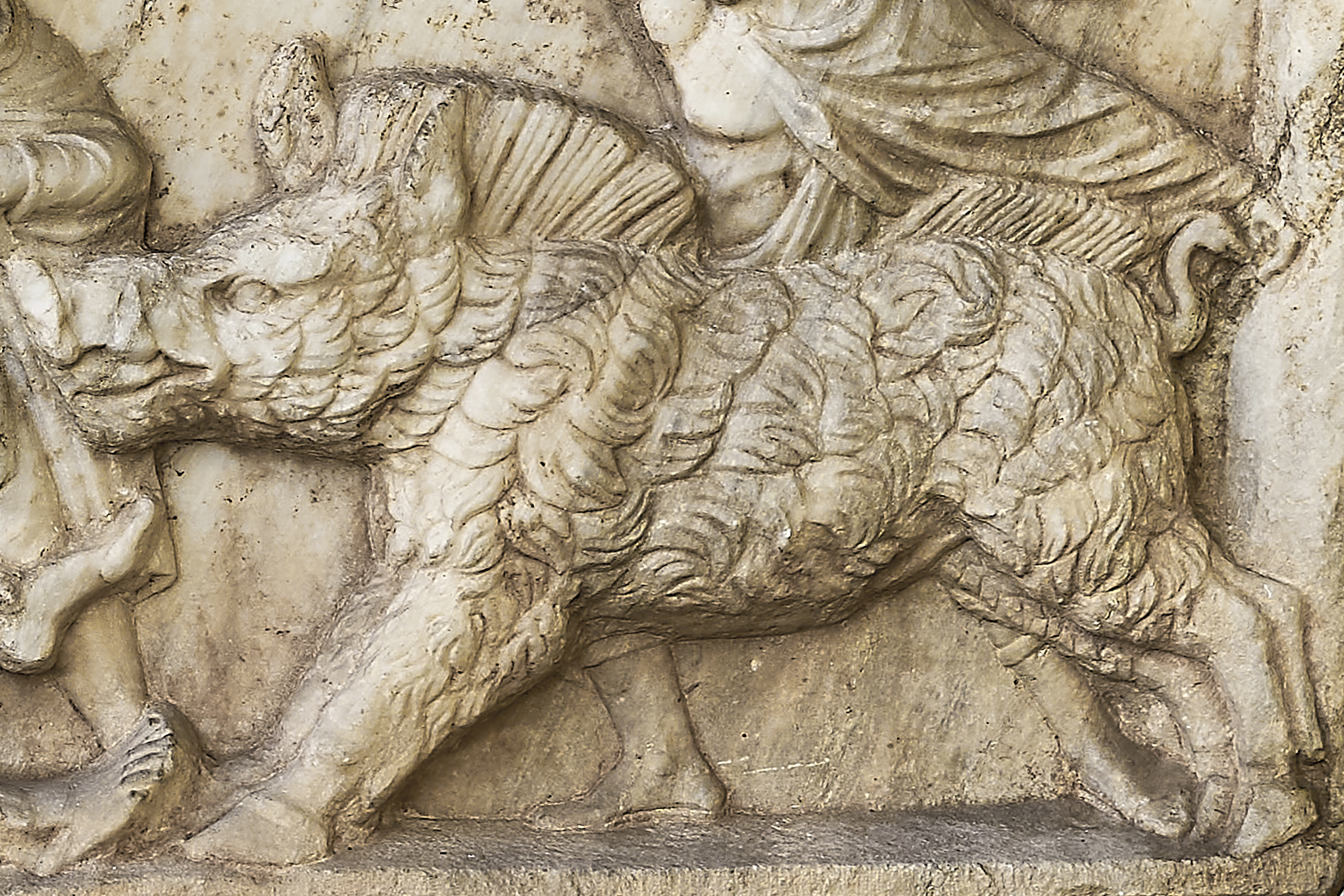
The boar on a Roman sarcophagus, late 2nd century, Archaeological Museum of Piraeus

Ovid describes the boar as follows:

A dreadful boar.—His burning, bloodshot eyes
seemed coals of living fire, and his rough neck
was knotted with stiff muscles, and thick-set
with bristles like sharp spikes. A seething froth
dripped on his shoulders, and his tusks
were like the spoils of Ind [India]. Discordant roars
reverberated from his hideous jaws;
and lightning—belched forth from his horrid throat—
scorched the green fields.

— Ovid, Metamorphoses 8.284–289 (Brookes More translation)

Ovid goes on to say that the boar rampaged throughout the countryside, destroying vineyards and crops, forcing people to take refuge inside their city walls.

According to Strabo, the boar was said to be the offspring of the Crommyonian Sow vanquished by Theseus.

=== The Hunt ===
Oeneus sent messengers out to look for the best hunters in Greece, offering them the boar's pelt and tusks as a prize.

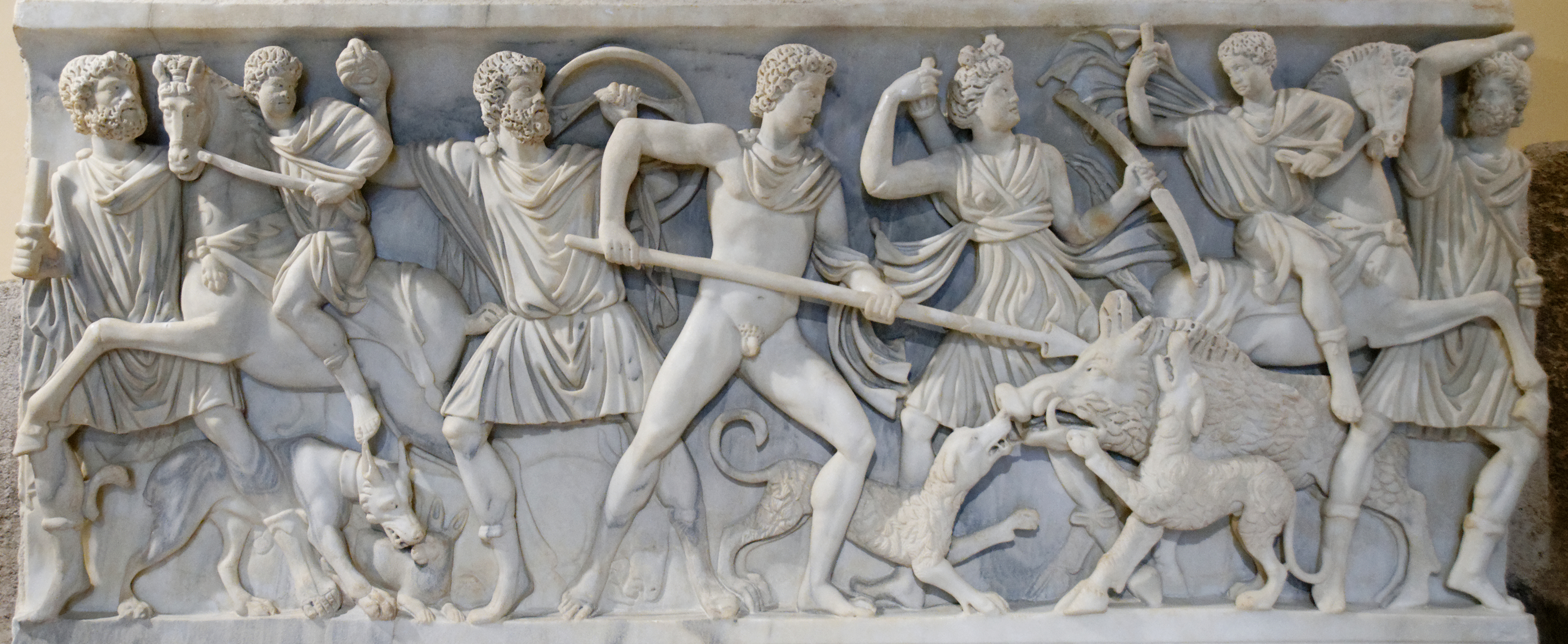
Roman marble sarcophagus from Vicovaro, carved with the Calydonian Hunt (Palazzo dei Conservatori, Rome)

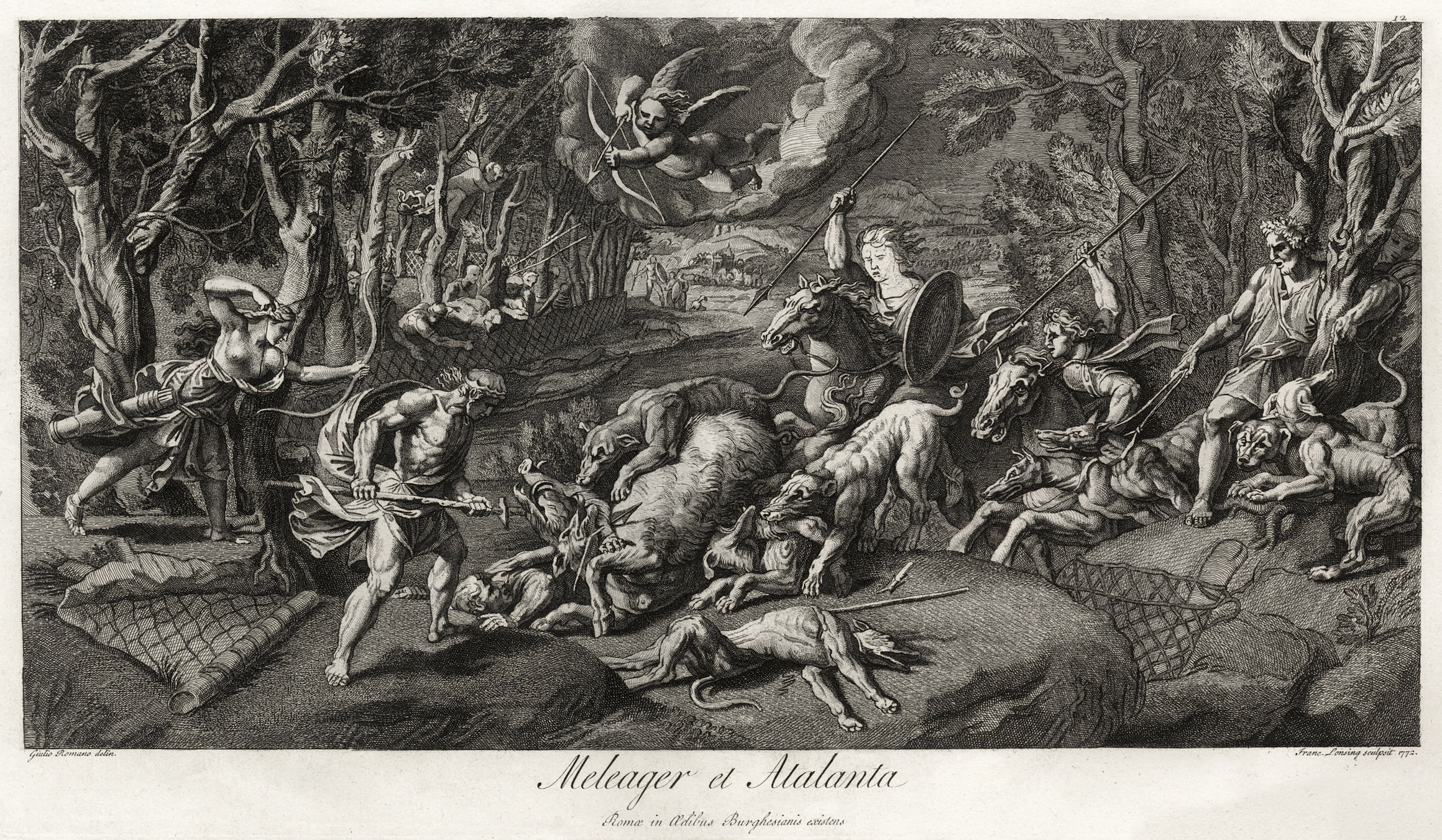
Meleager et Atalanta, after Giulio Romano

Among those who responded were some of the Argonauts, Oeneus's own son Meleager, and, remarkably for the hunt's eventual success, one woman—the huntress Atalanta, the "indomitable", who had been suckled by Artemis as a she-bear and raised as a huntress, a proxy for Artemis herself (Kerenyi; Ruck and Staples). Artemis appears to have been divided in her motives, for it was also said that she had sent the young huntress because she knew her presence would be a source of division, and so it was: many of the men, led by Kepheus and Ankaios, refused to hunt alongside a woman. It was the smitten Meleager who convinced them. Nonetheless, it was Atalanta who first succeeded in wounding the boar with an arrow, although Meleager finished it off, and offered the prize to Atalanta, who had drawn first blood. But the sons of Thestius, who considered it disgraceful that a woman should get the trophy where men were involved, took the skin from her, saying that it was properly theirs by right of birth, if Meleager chose not to accept it. Outraged by this, Meleager slew the sons of Thestius and again gave the skin to Atalanta (Bibliotheke). Meleager's mother, sister of Meleager's slain uncles, took the fatal brand from the chest where she had kept it (see Meleager) and threw it once more on the fire; as it was consumed, Meleager died on the spot, as the Fates had foretold. Thus Artemis achieved her revenge against King Oeneus.

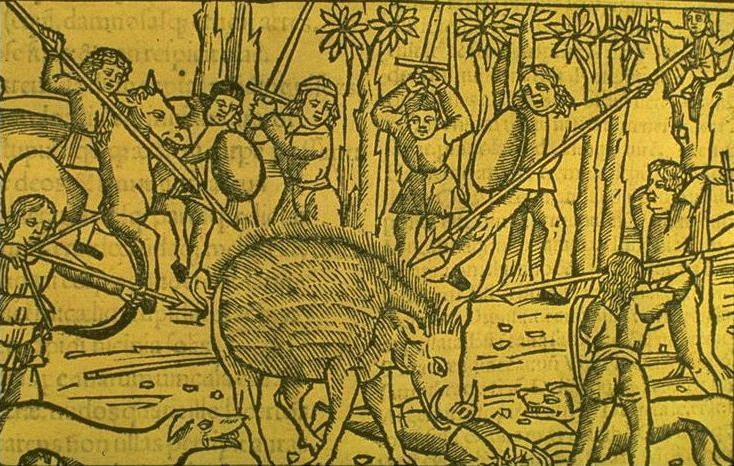
Woodcut for Raphael Regius's edition of Metamorphoses, Venice, c. 1518

During the hunt, Peleus accidentally killed his host, Eurytion. In the course of the hunt and its aftermath, many of the hunters turned upon one another, contesting the spoils, and so the Goddess continued to be revenged. According to Homer "the goddess brought to pass much clamour and shouting concerning his head and shaggy hide, between the Curetes and the great-souled Aetolians."

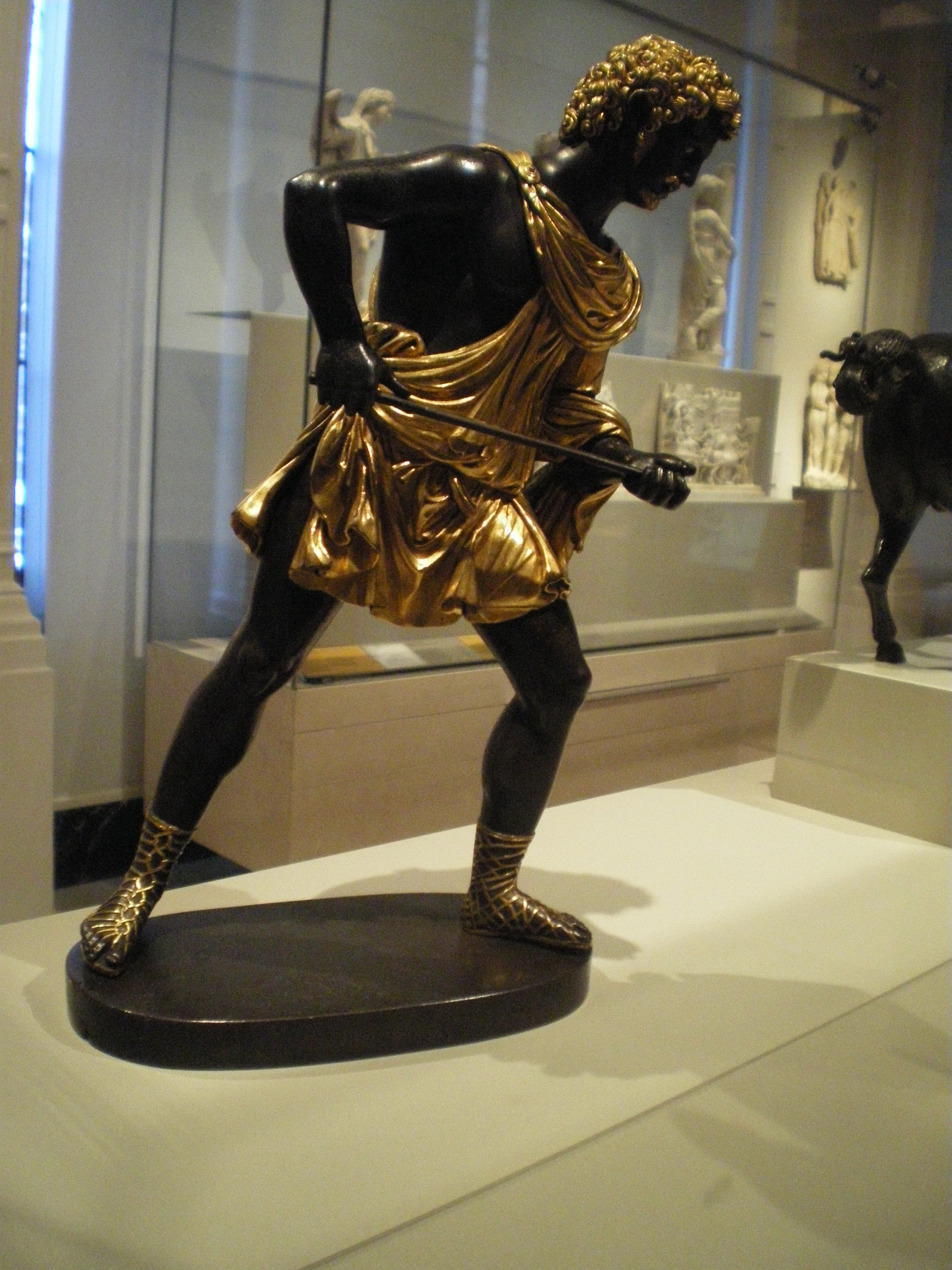
Meleager, one of the hunters. His javelin is broken and the boar is missing (Victoria and Albert Museum).

The boar's hide that was preserved in the Temple of Athena Alea at Tegea in Laconia was reputedly that of the Calydonian Boar, "rotted by age and by now altogether without bristles" by the time Pausanias saw it in the second century CE. He noted that the tusks had been taken to Rome as booty from the defeated allies of Mark Anthony by Augustus; "one of the tusks of the Calydonian boar has been broken", Pausanias reports, "the remaining one is kept in the gardens of the emperor, in a sanctuary of Dionysus, and is about half a fathom long", The Calydonian boar hunt was the theme of the temple's main pediment.

=== The Hunters ===
The hunters of the Caledonian boar
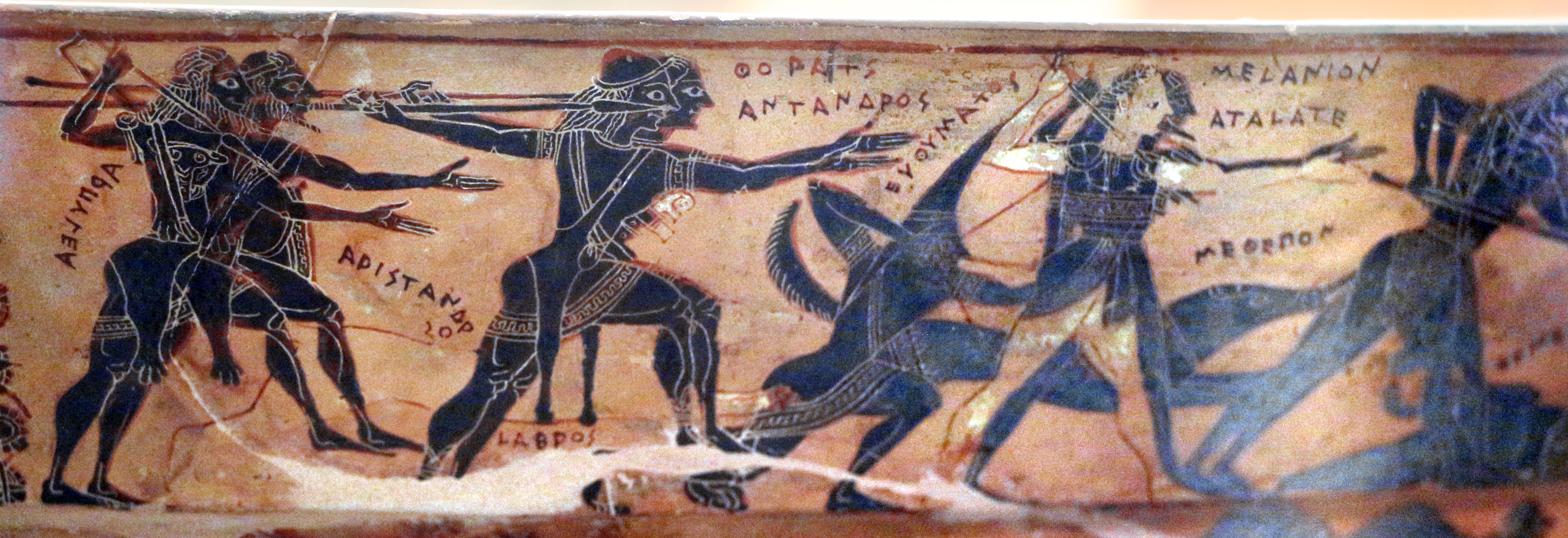
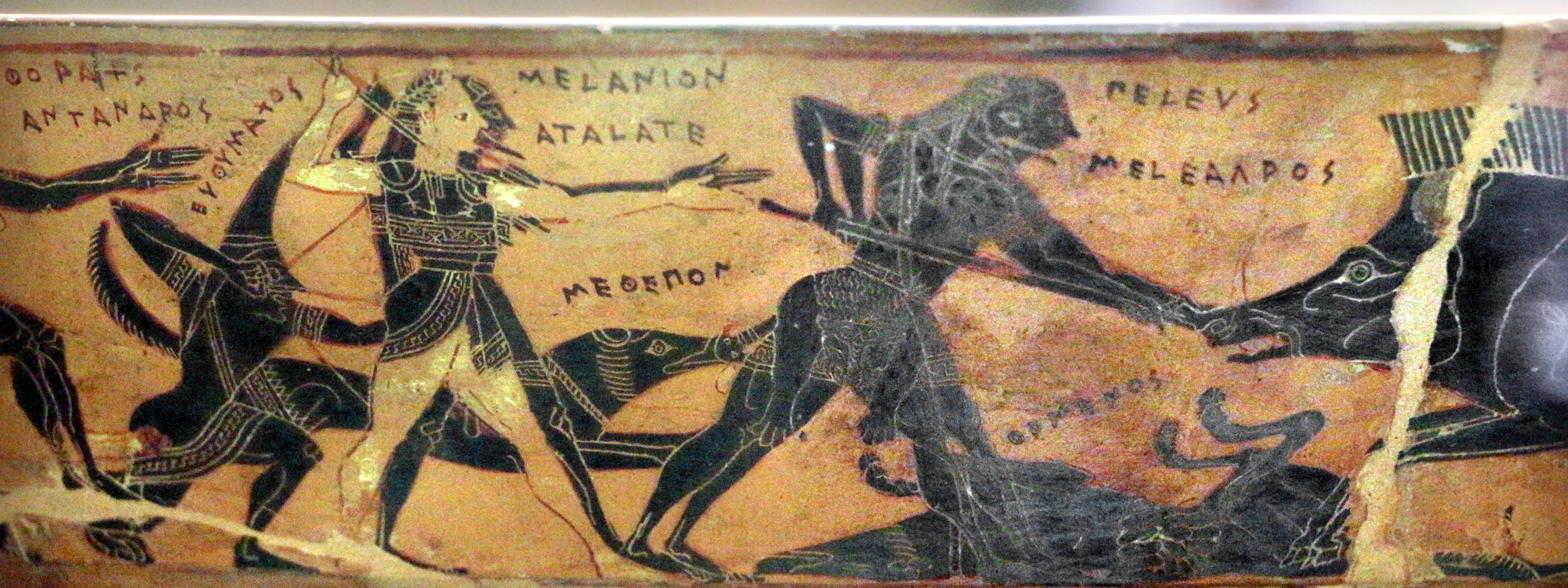
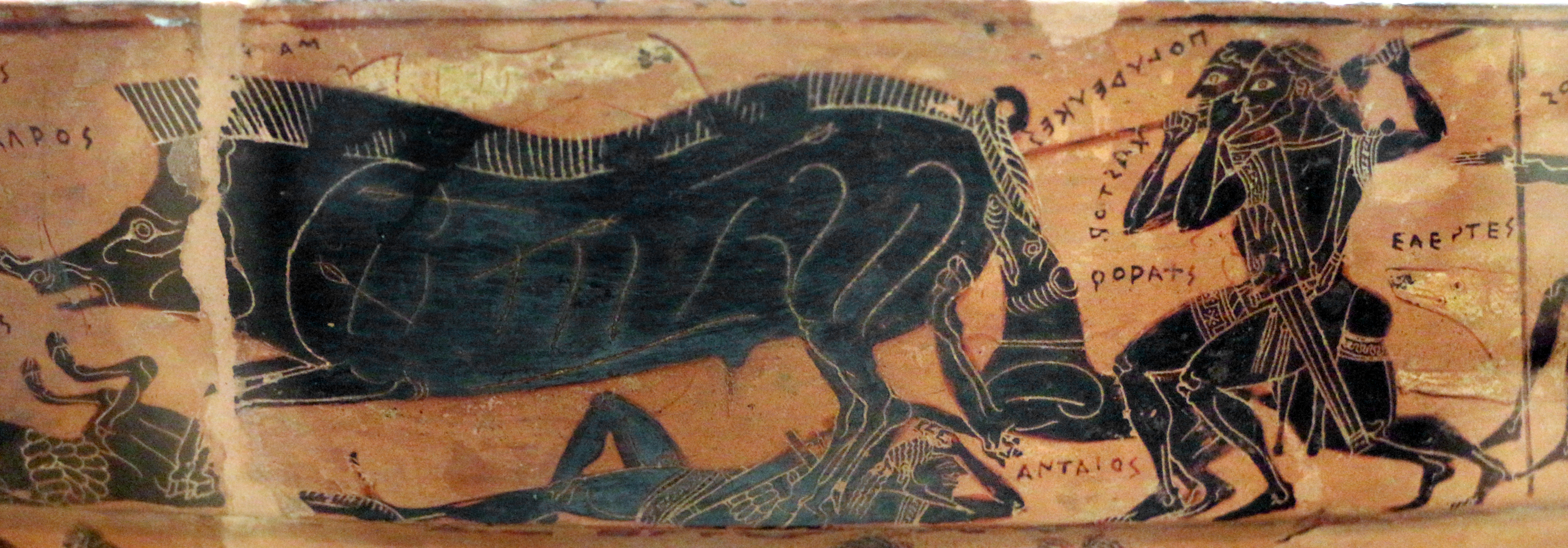
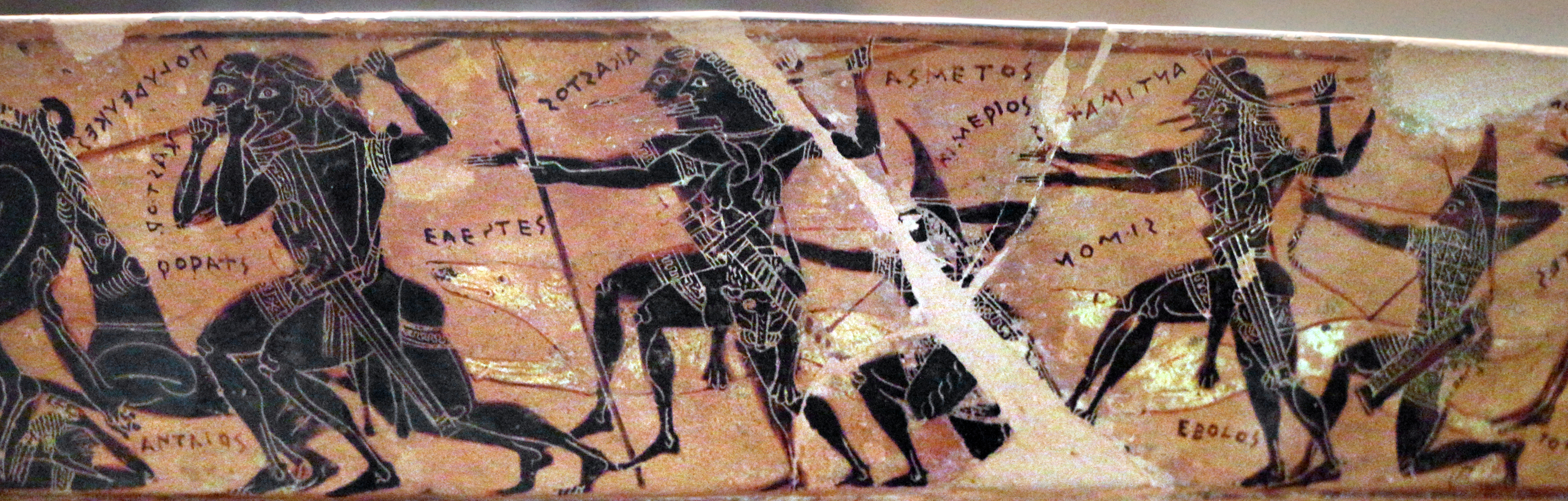
From the François Vase, c. 570 BCE

According to the Iliad, the heroes who participated in the hunt assembled from all over Greece. Bacchylides has Meleager describe himself and the rest of the hunters as "the best of the Hellenes".

The table lists:

- Those seen by Pausanias on the Temple of Athena Alea at Tegea, as well as another hero, Ischepolis, mentioned by Pausanias.
- Those listed by Latin mythographer Hyginus.
- Those noted in Ovid's list from the 8th Book of his Metamorphoses.
- Those listed by the mythographer Apollodorus.

Hero	Paus.	Hyg.	Ovid	Apd.	Notes
Acastus			✓		Ovid: "swift of dart"
Admetus		✓	✓	✓	Son of Pheres, from Pherae.
Alcon (son of Hippocoon)		✓			One of three sons of Hippocoon from Amyclae, according to Hyginus.
Alcon (son of Ares)		✓			Son of Ares from Thrace.
Amphiaraus	✓		✓	✓	Son of Oicles, from Argos; "As yet unruined by his wicked wife", i.e. Eriphyle.
Ancaeus	✓	✓	✓	✓	Son of Lycurgus, from Arcadia, killed by the boar. In Ovid's account he wielded a two-headed axe (bipennifer) but he was undone by his boastfulness which gave the boar time enough to charge him: Ancaeus was speared on the boar's tusks at the upper part of the groin and guts burst forth from the gashes it had made.
Asclepius		✓			Son of Apollo.
Atalanta	✓	✓	✓	✓	Daughter of Schoeneus, from Arcadia.
Caeneus		✓	✓		Son of Elatus; Ovid notes that Caeneus was "first a woman then a man".
Castor	✓	✓	✓	✓	Brother of Polydeuces; the Dioscuri, sons of Zeus and Leda, from Lacedaemon.
Cepheus				✓	Son of Lycurgus, brother of Ancaeus.
Cometes	✓				Son of Thestius, Meleager's uncle.
Cteatus			✓		One of the two sons of Actor, brother of Eurytus.
Deucalion		✓			Son of Minos.
Dryas of Calydon		✓	✓	✓	Son of Ares (Hyginus notes him as "son of Iapetus").
Echion		✓	✓		One of the Argonauts, son of Hermes and Antianeira, brother of Erytusson; Ovid says "first to hurl his spear".
Enaesimus		✓	✓		One of three sons of Hippocoon from Amyclae, according to Hyginus.
Epochus	✓				
Euphemus		✓			Son of Poseidon.
Eurypylus				✓	One of the sons of Thestius, according to Apollodorus.
Eurytion			✓	✓	King of Phtia, accidentally run through with a javelin by Peleus.
Eurytus (son of Hermes)		✓			
Eurytus (son of Actor)			✓		One of the two sons of Actor, brother of Cteatus.
Evippus				✓	One of the sons of Thestius, according to Apollodorus.
Hippalmus			✓		Along with Pelagon, attacked by the Boar, their bodies taken up by their comrades.
Hippasus		✓	✓		Son of Eurytus of Oechalia.
Hippothous	✓	✓	✓		Son of Kerkyon, son of Agamedes, son of Stymphalos.
Hyleus		✓	✓		
Idas		✓	✓	✓	Son of Aphareus, from Messene; brother of Lynceus.
Iolaus	✓	✓	✓		Son of Iphicles, nephew of Heracles.
Iphicles				✓	Amphitryon's mortal son from Thebes, the twin of Heracles (who took no part).
Iphiclus				✓	One of the sons of Thestius, according to Apollodorus.
Ischepolis	✓				Son of Alcathous (not mentioned by Pausanias as having been seen on the Temple of Athena Alea at Tegea).
Jason		✓	✓	✓	Aeson's son, from Iolkos.
Laertes		✓	✓		Son of Arcesius, Odysseus' father.
Lelex			✓		Of Naryx in Locria.
Leucippus		✓	✓		One of three sons of Hippocoon from Amyclae, according to Hyginus.
Lynceus		✓	✓	✓	Son of Aphareus, from Messene; brother of Idas.
Meleager	✓	✓	✓	✓	Son of Oeneus.
Mopsus		✓	✓		Son of Ampycus.
Nestor			✓		
Panopeus			✓		
Pelagon			✓		Along with Hippalmus, attacked by the Boar, their bodies taken up by their comrades.
Peleus	✓	✓	✓	✓	Son of Aiakos, father of Achilles from Phthia.
Phoenix		✓	✓		Son of Amyntor, tutor and companion of Achilles.
Phyleus			✓		From Elis.
Pirithous	✓		✓	✓	Son of Ixion, from Larissa, the friend of Theseus.
Plexippus		✓	✓	✓	One of the sons of Thestius, according to both Ovid and Apollodorus.
Polydeuces	✓	✓	✓	✓	
Prothous	✓				
Telamon	✓	✓	✓	✓	Son of Aeacus, father of Ajax.
Theseus	✓	✓	✓	✓	Faced another dangerous creature, the dusky wild Crommyonian Sow, on a separate occasion, which according to Strabo, was said to be the mother of the Calydonian boar.
Toxeus			✓		One of the sons of Thestius, according to Ovid.

== Modern ==
In the 19th century, Algernon Charles Swinburne wrote the play Atalanta in Calydon which retells the Greek myth of the Calydonian boar hunt. The play was republished in 1901 in the book Atalanta in Calydon: and lyrical poems.

== See also ==
- Erymanthian boar
- List of mythological pigs
