= Pleuron (Aetolia) =

Ancient Greek city

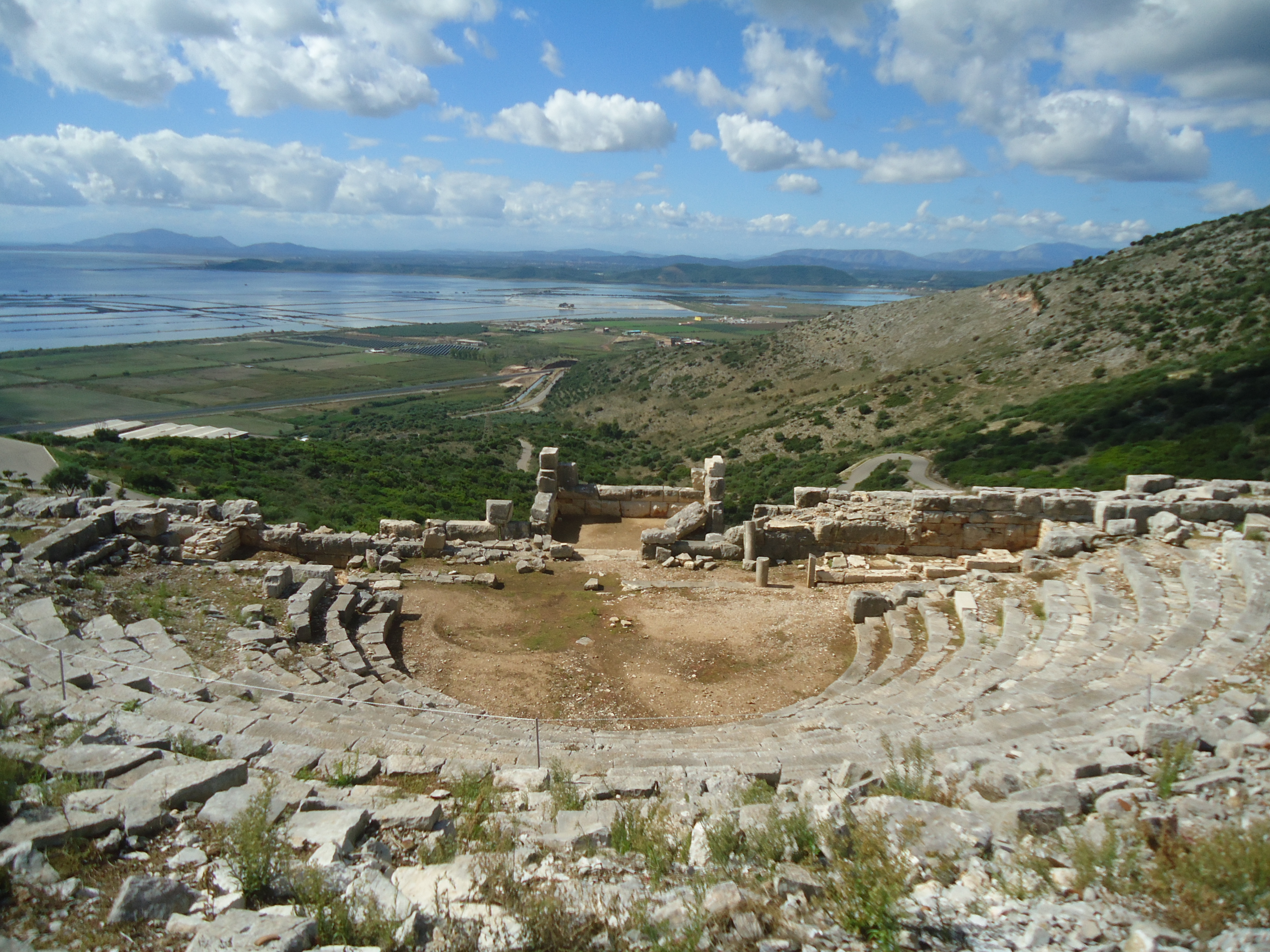
An ancient theater in Pleuron (Plevrona), with Mesolongi lagoon in the background.

Pleuron (Ancient Greek: Πλευρών, gen.: Πλευρῶνος; Greek: Πλευρώνα, Plevrona or Ασφακοβούνι, Asfakovouni) was a city in ancient Aetolia, Greece. The name refers to two settlements, the older of which was at the foot of Mount Curium between the river Acheloos and the river Evenos, and was mentioned by Homer in the Catalogue of Ships in the Iliad. The territory of Pleuron was called Pleuronia. The ruins of this more ancient city are 1.5 km to the southeast of the newer one. The circuit wall exhibits "the large roughly shaped stones and small stones in the interstices which are the characteristics of Cyclopean masonry."

== Old Pleuron ==
Old Pleuron (ἡ παλαιὰ Πλευρών) was situated in the plain between the Achelous and the Evenus, west of Calydon, at the foot of Mount Curium, from which the Curetes are said to have derived their name. Pleuron and Calydon were the two chief towns of Aetolia in the heroic age, and are said by Strabo to have been the ancient ornament (πρόσχημα) of Greece. Pleuron was originally a town of the Curetes, and its inhabitants were engaged in frequent wars with the Aetolians of the neighbouring town of Calydon. The Curetes, whose attack upon Calydon is mentioned in an episode of the Iliad, appear to have been the inhabitants of Pleuron. At the time of the Trojan War, however, Pleuron was an Aetolian city, and its inhabitants sailed against Troy under the command of the Aetolian chief Thoas, the grandson of Oeneus. Ephorus related that the Curetes were expelled from Pleuronia, which was formerly called Curetis, by Aeolians; and this tradition may also be traced in the statement of Thucydides that the district, called Calydon and Pleuronia in the time of the Peloponnesian War, formerly bore the name of Aeolis.

Since Pleuron appears as an Aetolian city in the later period of the heroic age, it is represented in some traditions as such from the beginning. Hence it is said to have derived its name from Pleuron, a son of Aetolus; and at the very time that some legends represent it as the capital of the Curetes, and engaged in war with Oeneus, king of Calydon, others suppose it to have been governed by the Aetolian Thestius, the brother of Oeneus. Thestius was also represented as a descendant of Pleuron; and hence Pleuron had an heroön or a chapel at Sparta, as being the ancestor of Leda, the daughter of Thestius. However, there are many variations in these traditions. Thus we find in Sophocles Oeneus, and not Thestius, represented as king of Pleuron. One of the tragedies of Phrynichus, the subject of which appears to have been the death of Meleager, the son of Oeneus, was entitled Πλευρώνιαι, or the "Pleuronian Women;" and hence it is not improbable that Phrynichus, as well as Sophocles, represented Oeneus as king of Pleuron. Pleuron is rarely mentioned in the historical period. It was the birthplace of the ancient Greek poet Alexander Aetolus. It was abandoned by its inhabitants, says Strabo, in consequence of the ravages of Demetrius Aetolicus, king of Macedon, who reigned 239-229 BCE. The ruins of Old Pleuron are located near modern Gyphtokastro/Petrovouni at 38°24′10″N 21°24′53″E.

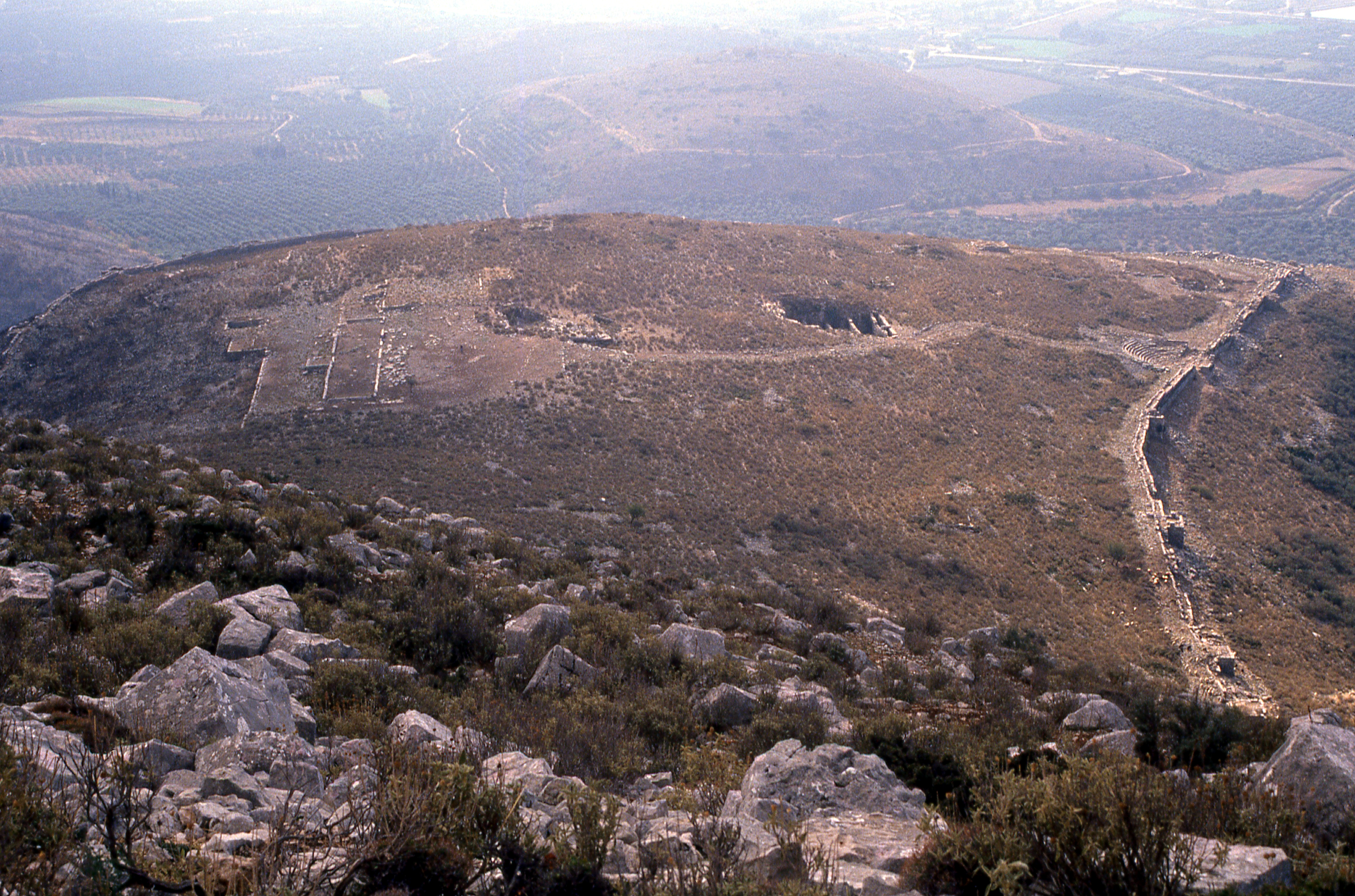
View of New Pleuron, looking south (agora at left, great cistern at center, theater and circuit wall at right)

== New Pleuron ==
It is uncertain whether New Pleuron (ἡ νεωτέρα Πλευρών) was founded only after the destruction of the old city by Demetrius Aetolicus, or whether it was pro-actively created as a defensible fortress prior to an anticipated attack. Strabo's account in Geographica, the only available source, may be read either way. The founder of the new city, situated at the foot of Mount Aracynthus, was probably Pantaleon of Pleuron, strategos of the Aetolian League in 242/41, 235/34, 228/27, 222/21 and 214/13 BCE. Some time after the defeat of the Aetolian League in the Roman–Seleucid War, the citizens of Pleuron asked the Roman Senate for a special permission to join the Achaean League. After the Achaean defeat and the destruction of Corinth in 146 BCE, Pleuron became part of the Roman Republic. During the Imperial age the uprisings in Aetolia continued.

New Pleuron has been identified in the locality of the castle of Κυρίας Εἰρήνης. The remains are located a few kilometers north of the modern city of Missolonghi (and just west of the ancient city of Calydon, with which is it sometimes associated). The ruins of New Pleuron are located at 38°24′52″N 21°24′35″E.

The city occupies a terrace at over 200m altitude, and is linked to the sea by a defence wall that also encircles the ancient port of Elaius.

The city wall is rectangular with 7 gates and 31 towers. The masonry is well preserved almost everywhere and partly trapezoidal, partly pseudo-isodomic with squared faces and datable to c. 230 BCE. The acropolis occupies the upper part of the site, but little remains. A Byzantine chapel was built on the remains of the Temple of Athena. The civil buildings are to the south. The theatre is in the south-west part of the city with the proscenium built against the city wall. The central part of the building housing the skena is a tower. The proscenium had six columns, and the parascenia must have been elevated above it and must have leaned against the wall. The circle of the orchestra is tangential to the skena. The cavea, well preserved at the north, had five sections and six staircases. The construction of the theatre is contemporary with the walls.

Other areas recognisable in the city include the site of the agora, with a 62 metres (203 ft) long stoa, and the gymnasium. To the south-east was a large communal cistern (30 by 20 metres (98 ft × 66 ft)) with five rectangular basins. There are also remains of unidentifiable public buildings and extensive remnants of houses and cisterns. The necropolis extends to the south of the city.
