= Epicaste =

Multiple Greek mythological figures

Epicaste (/ˌɛpɪˈkæstiː/; Ancient Greek: Ἐπικάστη Epikaste) or Epicasta (/ˌɛpɪˈkæstə/) is a name attributed to five women in Greek mythology.

- Epicaste, a Calydonian princess as daughter of King Calydon by Aeolia, daughter of Amythaon, and thus, sister of Protogeneia. She married her cousin Agenor, son of King Pleuron, and had by him children: Porthaon, Demonice, and possibly Thestius.
- Epicaste, an Elean princess as daughter of King Augeas. She bore Heracles a son, Thestalus.
- Epicaste, another name for Jocasta/Iocaste, used by Homer.
- Epicaste, wife of Clymenus, son of Teleus of Argos, and mother of Harpalyce, Idas, and Therager.
- Epicaste, daughter of Nestor and wife of Telemachus, son of Odysseus.
