= Protogeneia =

Multiple Greek mythological figures

Protogeneia (/ˌprɒtə.dʒəˈnaɪə/; Ancient Greek: Πρωτογένεια, lit. 'the firstborn'), in Greek mythology, may refer to:

- Protogeneia, a Phthian princess as the daughter of King Deucalion of Thessaly and Pyrrha, mythological progenitors of the Hellenes. She was the sister of Hellen and Amphictyon, Pandora II and possibly of Thyia, Melantho (Melanthea) and Candybus. By Zeus, Protogeneia became the mother of Opus, Aethlius, Aetolus and possibly of Dorus.
- Protogeneia, also called Cambyse, daughter of the above Opus. Zeus carried her off from the land of the Epeans and became by her, on mount Maenalus in Arcadia, the father of Opus II. She was later received by Locrus who for being childless, married Protogeneia and adopted her son Opus as his own.
- Protogeneia, a Calydonian princess as the daughter of King Calydon and Aeolia, daughter of Amythaon, and thus sister to Epicaste. By Ares, Protogeneia became the mother of Oxylus of Aetolia.
- Protogeneia, the eldest of the king Erechtheus's daughters. She and her sister Pandora were sacrificed on a hill called "Hyacinthus", and so were known as Hyacinthids.
