= Eurypylus =

Name of various mythical figures

In Greek mythology, Eurypylus (/jʊəˈrɪpɪləs/; Ancient Greek: Εὐρύπυλος, romanized: Eurupulos, lit. 'wide-gated') was the name of several different people:

- Eurypulus, son of Hyperochus, a descendant of Zeus. He was the father of Ormenus, grandfather of Amyntor.
- Eurypylus, a Thessalian king, son of Euaemon and Ops. He was a former suitor of Helen thus he led the Thessalians during Trojan War.
- Eurypylus, a son of Telephus and Astyoche. He was a great warrior, who led a Mysian contingent that fought alongside the Trojans against the Greeks in the Trojan War, and was killed by Achilles' son Neoptolemus.
- Eurypylus, son of Poseidon and king of Cos.
- Eurypylus, another son of Poseidon by the Pleiad Celaeno. He ruled over the Fortunate Islands.
- Eurypylus, the Thespian son of Heracles and Eubote, daughter of King Thespius of Thespiae. Eurypylus and his 49 half-brothers were born of Thespius' daughters who were impregnated by Heracles in one night, for a week or in the course of 50 days while hunting for the Cithaeronian lion. Later on, the hero sent a message to Thespius to keep seven of these sons and send three of them in Thebes while the remaining forty, joined by Iolaus, were dispatched to the island of Sardinia to found a colony.
- Eurypylus, a Pleuronian prince as the son of King Thestius and Eurythemis, daughter of Cleoboea. He was the brother of Althaea, Leda, Hypermnestra, Evippus, Plexippus and Iphiclus. Eurypylus participated in the hunt for the Calydonian Boar, during which he insulted Atalanta and was killed by Meleager.
- Eurypylus, son of Telestor and father of Asterodia who became the wife of Icarius of Sparta.
- Eurypylus, an Olenian prince as the son of King Dexamenus. He was the brother of Theronice, Theraephone and Deianira, also known as Mnesimache or Hippolyte. Eurypylus accompanied Heracles in his Trojan campaign. According to Pausanias, some authors related of him, and not of the son of Euaemon, the story of the cursed chest.
- Eurypylus, a prince of Tiryns as son of King Eurystheus and possibly Antimache, daughter of Amphidamas of Arcadia. He and his brothers Eurybius and Perimedes were all slain by Heracles when at a sacrificial meal in honor of his Twelve Labors being completed they served him a smaller portion of meat than they did for themselves. Eurypylus' other possible siblings were Admete, Alexander, Iphimedon and Mentor.
- Eurypylus, one of the Suitors of Penelope who came from Dulichium along with other 56 wooers. He, with the other suitors, was slain by Odysseus with the aid of Eumaeus, Philoetius, and Telemachus.
- Eurypylus, a son of Temenus, brother of Agelaus, Callias and Hyrnetho. As Temenus intended to leave his kingdom to Hyrnetho and Deiphontes, Eurypylus and his brothers hired assassins to kill Temenus, but the army still supported their sister and her husband.
- Eurypylus, father of two daughters Morphe and Clyte, who were said to have been the first prostitutes in history.
