= Thestius =

Greek mythological king of Pleuronians

In Greek mythology, Thestius (/ˈθɛstʃəs, ˈθɛstiəs/; Ancient Greek: Θέστιος, romanized: Théstios) was a king of Pleuronians in Aetolia. He is not to be confused with Thespius, who was sometimes referred to as "Thestius". The patronymic "Thestias" may refer to one of his daughters, Leda or Althaea, and "Thestiades" to his son Iphiclus.

== Family ==
Thestius was the son either of Ares by Demonice or Pisidice, or of Agenor (son of Pleuron) possibly by Epicasta. He was the brother of Evenus, Pylus and Molus or of Demonice and Porthaon instead. Thestius was the father of Iphiclus by Leucippe or Eurythemis, daughter of Cleoboea, who was the mother of his other children, Althaea, Eurypylus, Evippus, Hypermnestra, Leda and Plexippus. In other sources, the mother of Iphiclus, Althaea and Leda was named either Laophonte, daughter of Pleuron or Deidameia, daughter of Perieres. Other sons of Thestius were Cometes and Prothous, Toxeus, Aphares and Calydon.

Comparative table of Thestius' family
Relation	Name	Sources								
Relation	Name	Alcman	Pherecydes	Bacchy.	Sch. on Apollon.	Ovid	Apollod.	Plut.	Hyg.	Pau.
Parent(s)	Ares and Demonice						✓			
Parent(s)	Ares and Pisidice							✓		
Parent(s)	Agenor									✓
Wife	Deidameia				✓ or					
Wife	Laophonte	✓	✓		✓					
Wife	Eurythemis						✓			
Wife	Leucippe								✓	
Children	Iphiclus			✓	✓		✓		✓	
Children	Aphares			✓						
Children	Althaea	✓	✓	✓	✓	✓	✓		✓	✓
Children	Leda	✓	✓		✓		✓		✓	
Children	Toxeus					✓				
Children	Plexippus					✓	✓			
Children	Eurypylus						✓			
Children	Evippus						✓			
Children	Hypermnestra						✓		✓	
Children	Calydon							✓		
Children	Prothous									✓
Children	Cometes									✓

== Mythology ==
Thestius was allied with Tyndareus and Icarius against Hippocoon. According to Strabo, when Tyndareus and his brother Icarius, after being banished by Hippocoön from their homeland, went to Thestius, the king of the Pleuronii. The king helped the two brothers to acquire possession of much of the country on the far side of the Acheloüs on condition that they should receive a share of it. Tyndareus, however, went back home, having married Leda, the daughter of Thestius, whereas Icarius stayed on, keeping a portion of Acarnania, and by Polycaste, the daughter of Lygaeus, begot both Penelope and her brothers.

In a rare variant of the myth by Plutarch, the river Achelous in Aetolia was formerly called after Thestius. This Thestius who upon some domestic discontent traveled as far as Sicyon, where he had resided for some time, returned to his native home. But finding there his son Calydon and his mother [i.e. Pisidice] both upon the bed together, believing him to be an adulterer, slew his own child by a mistake. But when he beheld the unfortunate and unexpected fact he had committed, he threw himself into the river Axenos, which from thence was afterwards called Thestius.
