= Plexippus =

Set of mythological Greek characters

In Greek mythology, Plexippus or Plexippos (/ˈplɛksɪ.pəs/; Ancient Greek: Πλήξιππος) is a name that refers to:

- Plexippus, an Egyptian prince as one of the sons of Aegyptus. He married (and was killed by) Phicomone, daughter of Danaus.
- Plexippus, another son of Aegyptus who suffered the same fate as his namesake brother above after marrying his cousin Pyrantis, another daughter of Danaus.
- Plexippus, a Thracian prince as son of Phineus and Cleopatra, brother of Pandion. He and his brother were blinded by Phineus at the instigation of their stepmother Idaea.
- Plexippus, a Pleuronian prince as the son of King Thestius of Pleuron and Eurythemis, daughter of Cleoboea. He was the brother of Althaea, Leda, Hypermnestra, Evippus, Eurypylus and Iphiclus. Together with his other brother Toxeus, Plexippus participated in the hunt for the Calydonian Boar. He was angry that the prize of the boar's hide had been given to a woman (Atalanta) by his nephew Meleager, who then killed him in the ensuing argument.
- Plexippus, an Arcadian prince as the son of the King Choricus, brother of Enetus and Palaestra.

Plexippus (spider) is also a genus of jumping spiders.
