= Thoas (king of Aetolia) =

King in Greek mythology

In Greek mythology, Thoas (/ˈθoʊəs/; Ancient Greek: Θόας, meaning roughly "dasher" or "racer"), a king of Aetolia, was the son of Andraemon and Gorge, and one of the heroes who fought for the Greeks in the Trojan War. Thoas had a son Haemon, and an unnamed daughter.

In the Iliad Thoas is the leader of the forty-ship Aetolian contingent at Troy. He is mentioned several times in the Iliad, where he is described as excelling both in fighting and in speaking. Other sources list Thoas as one of the suitors of Helen, and as one of the warriors hidden inside the Wooden Horse. He was one of the few Greeks to return home safely after the war.

== Family ==
Thoas's father was Andraemon, whose birth and origin are unknown. Andraemon married Gorge, the daughter of Oeneus, who was the king of Calydon, an ancient Aetolian city-state, and the father of the heroes Tydeus (one of the Seven against Thebes) and Meleager (the host of the Calydonian boar hunt, and one of the Argonauts), and grandfather of the Trojan War hero Diomedes. An aged Oeneus lost his kingdom to the sons of his brother Agrius. But his grandson Diomedes was able to reclaim the kingdom, and install Oeneus's son-in-law Andraemon as the king of Calydon.

Thoas had a son Haemon, and an unnamed daughter. Haemon was the father of Oxylus, who guided the Heracleidae in their invasion of the Peloponnese, and as reward for this, Oxylus was given the throne of Elis. Thoas' daughter married Odysseus, by whom she had a son Leontophonus (Lion Slayer).

== The Trojan War ==
By the time of the Trojan War, Thoas had apparently succeeded his father Andraemon to the Calydonian throne. The Iliad describes him as ruling Calydon and the nearby city of Pleuron, where, it says, he was "honoured ... even as a god". According to the Hesiodic Catalogue of Women, Thoas was one of the suitors of Helen. So he had, as had all the suitors, sworn an oath which obligated him to go to war with Troy to return Helen to her husband Menelaus. According to the Iliad's Catalogue of Ships, because Oeneus, his sons, and his grandson Meleager were all dead, Thoas led the forty-ship Aetolian contingent fighting at Troy.

=== In the Iliad ===
In the Iliad, though only a minor leader, with neither individual character, nor particular achievements, Thoas is nevertheless well respected, with several occasional mentions. He is described as

far the best of the Aetolians, well-skilled in throwing the javelin, but a good man too in close fight, and in the place of assembly could but few of the Achaeans surpass him, when the young men were striving in debate.

In Book 4, Thoas kills a Thracian, but is unable to strip him of his armor, being driven back by several of the dead warrior's comrades. in Book 7, he is one of the nine Greek warriors, who, after being rebuked by Nestor, finally volunteer to fight Hector in single combat. In Book 13, Poseidon, going among the Greeks urging them to fight on, goes first to Teucer, then to Leitus, Peneleos, Thoas, Deïpyrus, Meriones, and Antilochus, and later in the same Book, with the Greeks desperately battling to save their ships, Poseidon, under the guise of Thoas, asks the Greek hero Idomeneus: Where have all our proud Greek threats against the Trojans gone? And Idomenes responds, that Zeus must wish for all our deaths, far from home and unremembered, but:

Thoas, seeing that aforetime thou wast ever staunch in fight, and dost also urge on another, wheresoever thou seest one shrinking from fight, therefore now cease thou not, but call to every man.

His only speech occurs in Book 15 where the Greeks, having seen Hector miraculously reappear on the battlefield, are "seized with fear". But Thoas, addressing the Greeks, says:

"Now look you, verily a great marvel is this that mine eyes behold, how that now he is risen again and hath avoided the fates, even Hector. In sooth the heart of each man of us hoped that he had died beneath the hands of Aias, son of Telamon. But lo, some one of the gods hath again delivered and saved Hector, who verily hath loosed the knees of many Danaans, as, I deem, will befall even now, since not without the will of loud-thundering Zeus doth he stand forth thus eagerly as a champion. Nay come, even as I shall bid, let us all obey. The multitude let us bid return to the ships, but ourselves, all we that declare us to be the best in the host, let us take our stand, if so be we first may face him, and thrust him back with our outstretched spears; methinks, for all his eagerness he will fear at heart to enter into the throng of the Danaans."

And finally, in Book 19, Thoas is one of the small delegations of Greeks who Odysseus took with him to the tent of Agamemnon, to bring back the many gifts Agamemnon had pledged to give Achilles, in reparation for his taking Briseis.

=== Other sources ===
After the Iliad in the Posthomerica, Thoas appears regularly throughout. In Book 4, he participated in the chariot race during the funeral games of Achilles, in which he came third after Menelaus and Sthenelus. In Book 6, after originally fleeing from Eurypylus, son of Telephus, he along with Teucer, Idomeneus, Meriones, and Thrasymedes, son of Nestor, go and save Agamemnon and Menelaus from being slain. In the process Thoas with his spear wounded Paris, the cause of the war, on the right thigh, after Eurypylus had killed his friend Echemmon. In Book 11, he killed Lamus and Lyncus. In Book 12, he is mentioned as one of the men inside the Trojan Horse.

Two other events concerning Thoas's involvement in the Trojan War, occurred after the events covered in the Iliad, and are given in other later sources. In the Little Iliad, a poem in the Trojan War Cycle covering the war from the death of Achilles, to the building of the Wooden Horse, Thoas wounds Odysseus, so as to make him unrecognizable on a spy mission inside Troy. Several late sources name Thoas as was one of the Greek warriors who were hidden inside the Wooden Horse.

Thoas is also mentioned in the Odyssey, in a war story told by Odysseus.

=== After the war ===
Thoas was one of the few Greek leaders to return from the war unharmed. According to some accounts he returned to Aetolia where, presumably, he resumed his rule, while according to others Thoas settled in Italy, in the land of the Brutti.

Local tradition associated Thoas with the Greek city of Amphissa, the main city of Western Locris. The geographer Pausanias reports seeing a tomb at Amphissa, which was said to be the tomb of Thoas' parents Andraemon and Gorge, and a bronze statue of Athena in her temple on the acropolis of Amphissa, that was said to have been brought back from Troy by Thoas as a spoil of war. Apollodorus reports that according to some, after Odysseus was exiled from Ithaca in punishment for his killing the suitors of Penelope, he sought refuge with Thoas in Aetolia. There he married Thoas' daughter, had a son Leontophonus with her, and died of old age.
