= Calydon =

Greek city in ancient Aetolia

Coordinates: 38°22′21″N 21°31′59″E

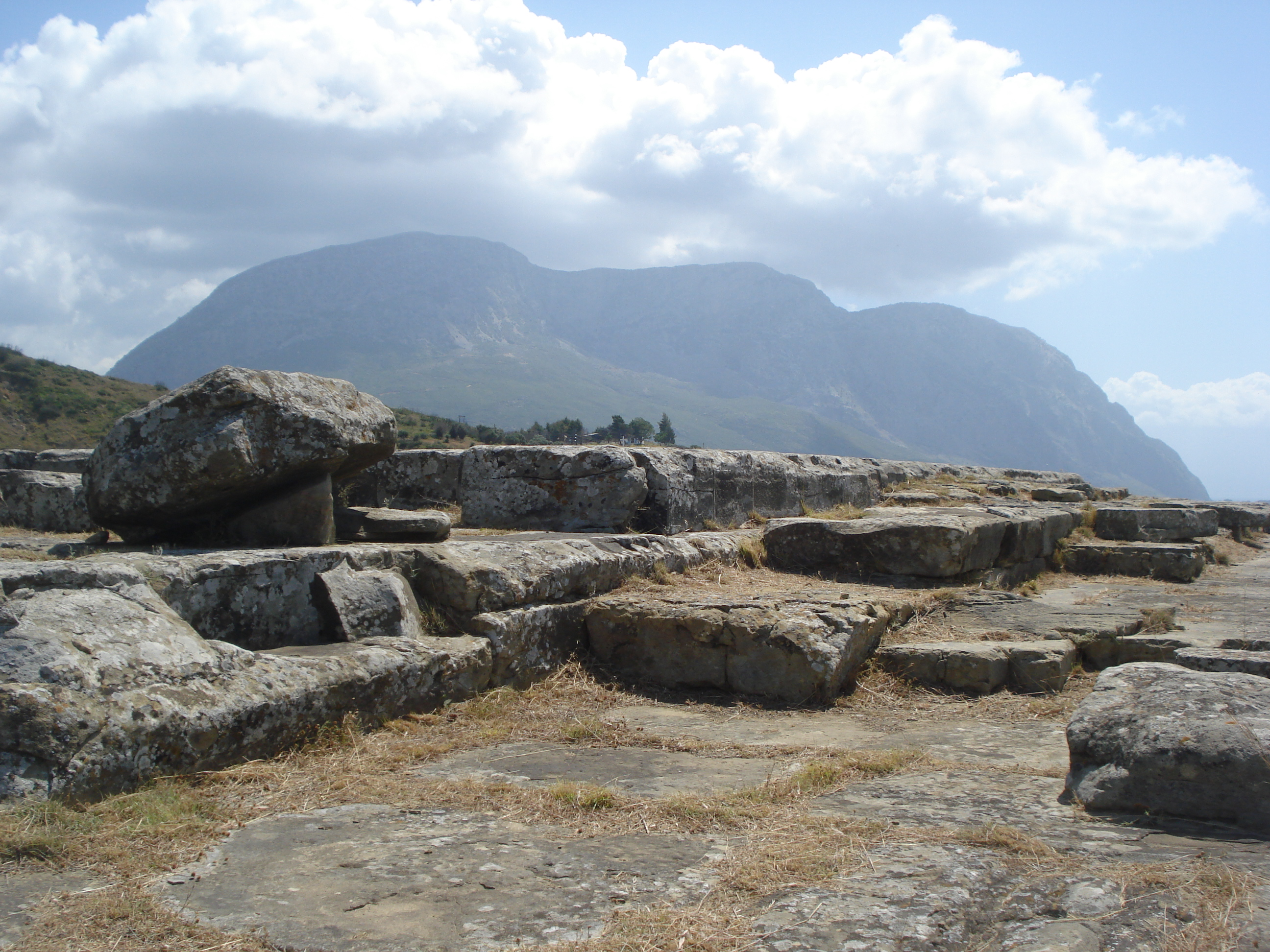
The Laphrion sanctuary plateau of Calydon with Varasova mountain on the background.

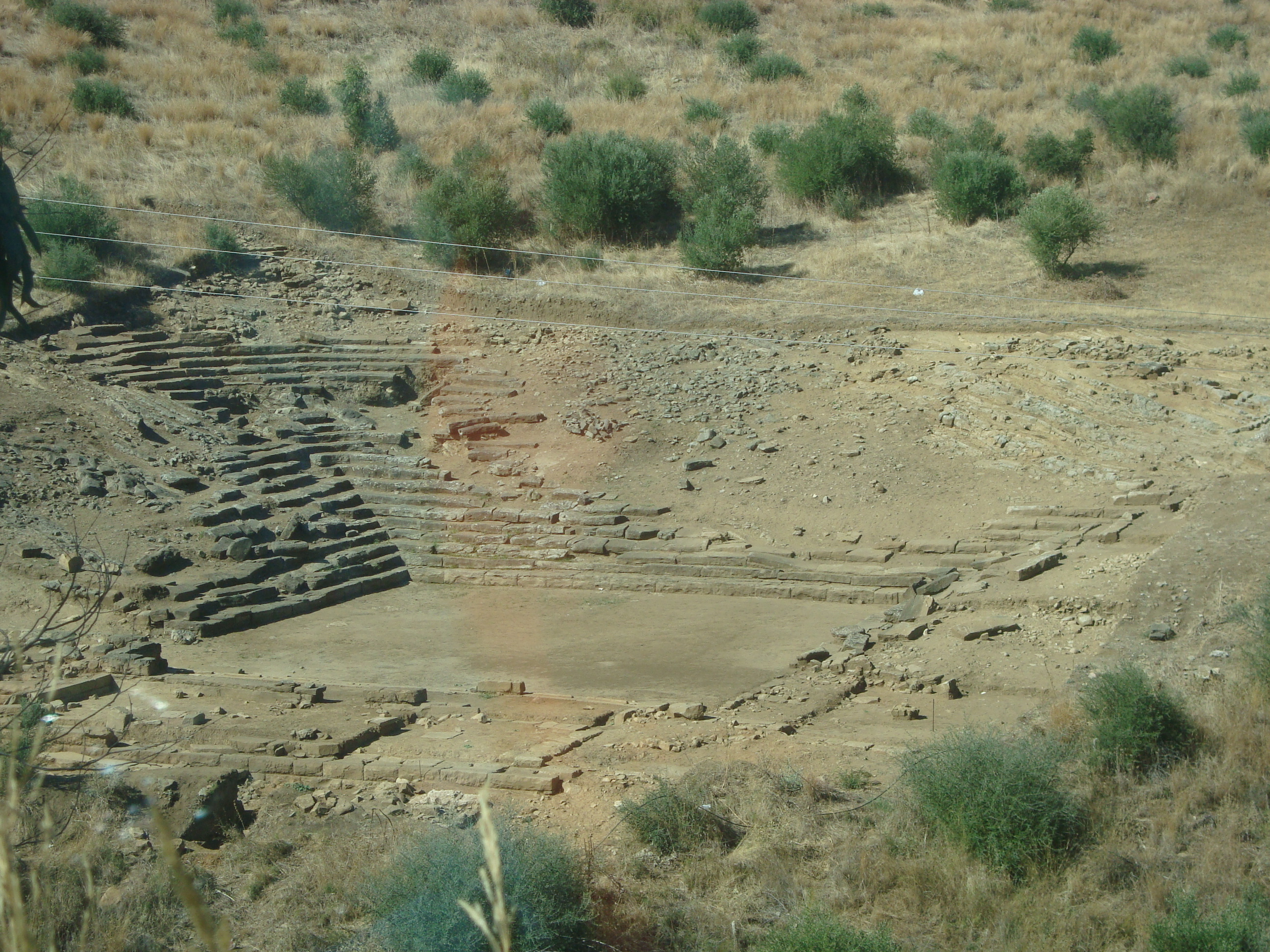
Ancient theater of Calydon

Calydon (/ˈkælɪdɒn/; Ancient Greek: Καλυδών, Kalydōn) was a Greek city in ancient Aetolia, situated on the west bank of the river Evenus, 7.5 Roman miles (approx. 11 km) from the sea. Its name is most famous today for the Calydonian boar that had to be overcome by heroes of the Olympian age.

== Mythology ==
According to Greek mythology, Calydon was founded by Aetolus in the land of the Curetes, and was called Calydon, after the name of his son, Calydon. Calydon and the neighbouring town of Pleuron are said by Strabo to have been once the "ornament" of Greece, but by his time (late 1st century BC) had sunk into insignificance. It is frequently mentioned in the Iliad by Homer, who celebrates the fertility of the plain of "lovely" Calydon. In the earliest times the inhabitants of Calydon appear to have been engaged in incessant hostilities with the Curetes, who continued to reside in their ancient capital Pleuron, and who endeavoured to expel the invaders from their country. A vivid account of one of the battles between the Curetes and Calydonians is given in an episode of the Iliad.

The heroes of Calydon are among the most celebrated of the heroic age. It was the residence of Oeneus, father of Tydeus and Meleager, and grandfather of Diomedes. In the time of Oeneus, Artemis sent a monstrous boar (the Calydonian Boar) to lay waste the fields of Calydon, which was hunted by Meleager and numerous other heroes. The Calydonians took part in the Trojan War under their king Thoas, the son (not the grandson) of Oeneus.

== History ==
Calydon is not often mentioned in the historical period. In 391 BC, it was recorded as being in the possession of the Achaeans, but the means of possession are unclear; however, it is better documented that Naupactus was given to the Achaeans at the close of the Peloponnesian War, and it was probably the Achaeans settled at Naupactus who gained possession of the town. In the above-mentioned year the Achaeans at Calydon, were so hard pressed by the Acarnanians that they applied to the Lacedaemonians for help; and Agesilaus II in consequence was sent with an army into Aetolia. Calydon remained in the hands of the Achaeans till the overthrow of the Spartan supremacy by the Battle of Leuctra (371 BC), when Epaminondas restored the town to the Aetolians.

In the civil war between Julius Caesar and Pompey (in 48 BC) it still appears as a considerable place; but a few years afterwards its inhabitants were removed by Augustus to Nicopolis, which he founded to commemorate his victory at the Battle of Actium in 31 BC. It continues however to be mentioned by the later geographers.

Calydon was the headquarters of the worship of Artemis Laphria, and when the inhabitants of the town were removed to Nicopolis, Augustus gave to Patrae in Achaea the statue of this goddess which had belonged to Calydon. There was also a statue of Dionysus at Patrae which had been removed from Calydon. Near Calydon there was a temple of Apollo Laphrius; and in the neighbourhood of the city there was also a lake celebrated for its fish.

Its site is located north of the modern Evinochori. One of the tunnels of the A5 motorway crosses under the ruins of Calydon, and is named the Calydon Tunnel (Greek: Σήραγγα Καλυδώνας) after it.

== Archaeology ==
Previous and more recent excavations have revealed many buildings including:

- the Hellenistic theatre of an unusual square plan
- the Hellenistic Heroon (palaestra) with a rich tomb underneath the Heroon
- the Artemis Laphria sanctuary with the temple of Artemis, smaller temple of Apollo, and remains of other buildings spanning the Geometric to the Hellenistic period
- the Lower Acropolis where excavations were carried out recently uncovering a house from the 2nd cent BC
- the Lower Town where a peristyle house and kilns were found

== Finds ==
Many finds from the site including ancient terracottas from the temple of Artemis are exhibited in the Archaeological Museum of Agrinion and in the National Archaeological Museum, Athens.

== See also ==
- List of ancient Greek cities
- Calydonian Boar
- Oeneus
- Meleagros

== Bibliography ==
Archaeological reports

- Dyggve, Ejnar; Poulsen, Frederik; Rhomaios, Konstantinos (1934). Das Heroon von Kalydon. Copenhagen: Levin & Munksgaard.
- Dyggve, Ejnar; Poulsen, Frederik (1948). Das Laphrion, der Tempelbezirk von Kalydon. Copenhagen: Kongelige danske Videnskabernes Selskab. Arkæologisk- kunsthistoriske Skrifter, Bd. 1, Nr. 2.
- Dietz, S.; Stavropoulou-Gatsi, M. (2011). Kalydon in Aitolia: reports and studies; Danish/Greek field work 2001-2005. Vol. 1-2. Aarhus: Aarhus University Press. ISBN 9788772886282.
- Vikatou, O.; Frederiksen, R.; Handberg, S. (2014). "The Danish-Greek Excavations at Kalydon, Aitolia: The Theatre. Preliminary report from the 2011 and 2012 campaigns". Proceedings of the Danish Institute at Athens. VII: 221–234.
- Vikatou, O.; Handberg, S. (2017). The Lower Acropolis of Kalydon in Aitolia. Preliminary report on the excavations carried out in 2013-15. Vol. VIII. pp. 191–206. doi:10.2307/j.ctv3405qph.10.
- Frederiksen, Rune; Handberg, Søren (2023). The ancient theatre at Kalydon in Aitolia. Aarhus: Aarhus University Press. ISBN 9788772192826.

Discussions
