= Agelaus =

Set of various people in Greek mythology

Agelaus or Agelaos (Ancient Greek: Ἀγέλαος, romanized: Agélāos, lit. 'leading the herd', 'driving the people' or 'leader of the people') is, in Greek mythology, the name of various individuals.

- Agelaus, father of Antheus of Lyctus. He fought in the army of Dionysus during his campaigns in India.
- Agelaus, an Arcadian prince as the son of King Stymphalus. He was the father of Phalanthus.
- Agelaus, also Ageleus (Ageleos), a Calydonian prince as the son of King Oeneus and Queen Althaea.
- Agelaus, son of Heracles and Omphale, and ancestor of Croesus. In other sources this son is instead called Lamus.
- Agelaus, a common herdsman (or slave of Priam) who saved the life of the Trojan prince Paris, exposed as an infant on Mount Ida owing to a prophecy that he would bring destruction to Troy. Priam had instructed him to kill the boy, so the herdsman left him on a mountainside where he was nursed by a bear. After discovering he had survived five days of exposure, Agelaus brought him to his home to raise as his son. He and his wife, Phrygia, had recently lost a child of their own. When Paris travelled to Troy to retrieve a bull, Agelaus was forced to reveal his true heritage to stop Deiphobus killing him for winning the city games.
- Agelaus, son of Maion. He was a Trojan warrior and killed, during the Trojan War, by Ajax.
- Agelaus of Miletus, son of Hippasus. He fought against the Greeks as part of contingent of Nastes in the Trojan War and was killed by Meges.
- Agelaus, son of Phradmon, and a Trojan warrior. He was killed during the war by Diomedes.
- Agelaus, son of Evenor, and one of the attendants of Acamas during the Trojan War.
- Agelaus, a Greek warrior slain by Hector during the Trojan War.
- Agelaus, or Agelaos, son of Damastor and one of the Suitors of Penelope who came from Same along with other 22 wooers. He, with the other suitors, was shot dead by Odysseus with the aid of Eumaeus, Philoetius, and Telemachus.
- Agelaus, son of Temenus and descendant of Heracles. Agelaus, along with his brothers (Eurypylus and Callias), hired men to kill his father, since he gave his favour to their sister Hyrnetho and her husband Deiphontes. When this was discovered, the people gave the throne to Deiphontes and Hyrnetho.
