= Amphiaraus =

Figure from Greek mythology

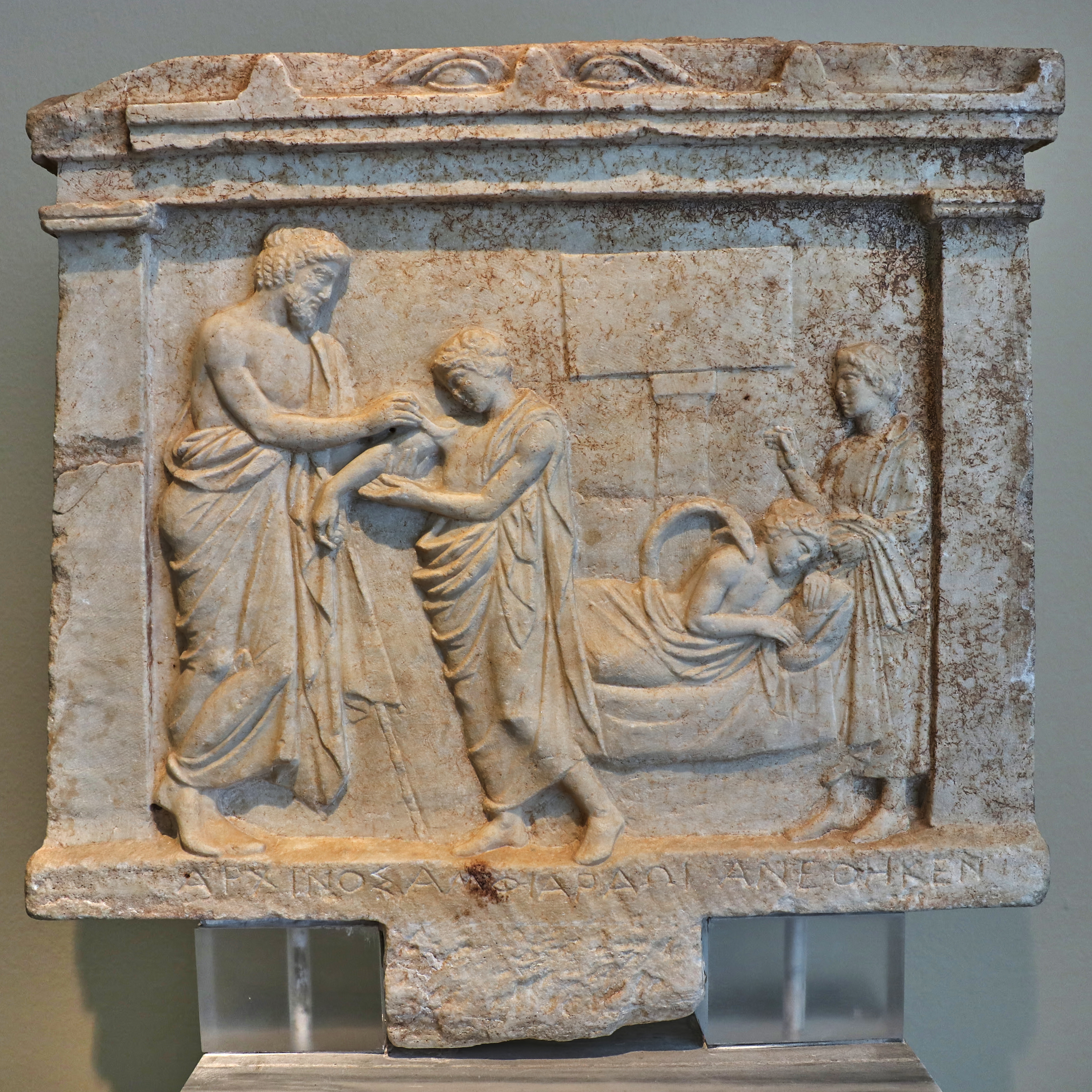
Votive relief for Amphiaraus depicting him healing a patient, marble c. 400–350 BC, National Archaeological Museum of Greece.

Amphiaraus or Amphiaraos (/ˌæmfiəˈreɪəs/; Ancient Greek: Ἀμφιάραος or Ἀμφιάρεως, romanized: Amphiáraos or Amphiáreos, lit. 'very sacred' or 'one who brings prayers') was in Greek mythology the son of Oicles, a seer, and one of the leaders of the Seven against Thebes. Amphiaraus at first refused to go with Adrastus on this expedition against Thebes as he foresaw the death of everyone who joined the expedition. His wife, Eriphyle, eventually compelled him to go.

== Family ==
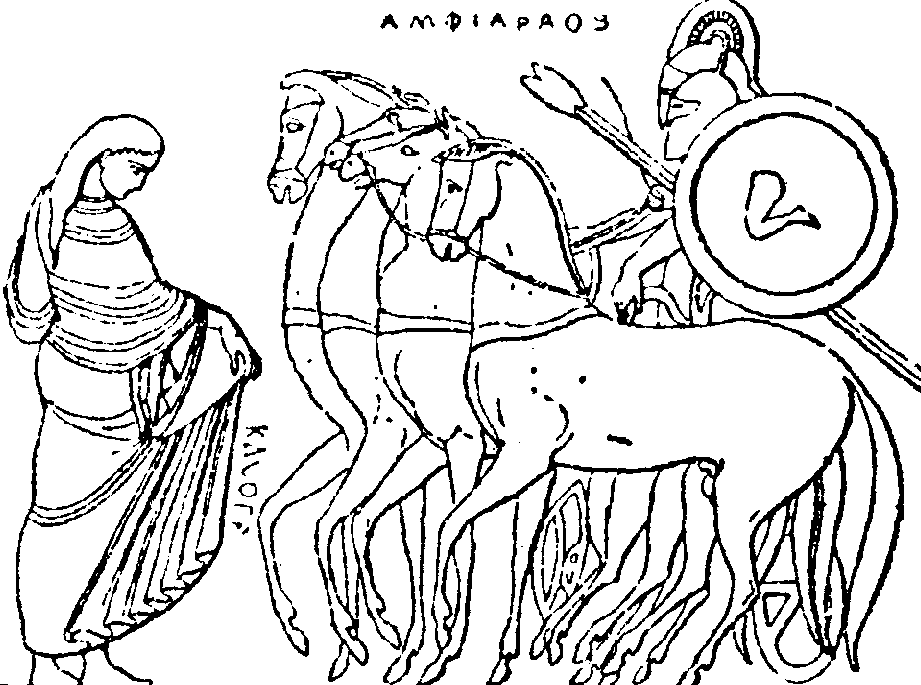
Amphiaraus on his chariot.

Amphiaraus was the son of Oicles. This made Amphiaraus a great-grandson of Melampus, himself a legendary seer, and a member of one of the most powerful dynastic families in the Argolid. The mythographer Hyginus says that Amphiaraus's mother was Hypermnestra, the daughter of Thestius. She was the sister of Leda, the queen of Sparta who was the mother of Helen of Troy, Clytemnestra, and the Dioscuri (Castor and Pollux). Hyginus also reports that "some authors" said that Amphiaraus was the son of Apollo.

Amphiaraus married Eriphyle, the sister of his cousin Adrastus (the grandson of Melampus's brother Bias), and by her was the father of two sons, Alcmaeon and Amphilochus. From the geographer Pausanias, we hear of three daughters, Eurydice, Demonissa and Alcmena. He reports seeing on the Chest of Kypselos at Olympia, a scene showing Amphiararaus's departure for the expedition against Thebes. Pausanias identifies (possible from inscriptions) other participants in the scene as: the infant Amphilochus, Eryphyle, her daughters, Eurydice and Demonissa, and a naked Alcmaeon. He goes on to add that the poet Asius also has Alcmena as a daughter of Amphiaraus and Eriphyle. According to Plutarch, Alexida was a daughter of Amphiaraus.

The Clytidae (alternate spelling "Klytidiai"), a clan of seers at Olympia, claimed to be the descendants of a Clytius, who they said was the son of Amphiaraus's son Alcmaeon. According to Roman legends, the founder of the town of Tibur (modern Tivoli) near Rome, was a son of Amphiaraus.

== Mythology ==
Amphiaraus was a seer, and greatly honored in his time. Both Zeus and Apollo favored him, and Zeus gave him his oracular talent. In the generation before the Trojan War, Amphiaraus was one of the heroes present at the Calydonian boar hunt and also counted as an Argonaut.

The material of the tragic war of the Seven against Thebes was taken up from several points of view by each of the three great Greek tragic poets. Eriphyle persuaded Amphiaraus to take part in the raiding venture, against his better judgment, for he knew he would die. He had foreseen the failure and for this reason did not agree to join at first. Eriphyle had been persuaded by Polynices, who offered her the necklace of Harmonia, daughter of Aphrodite, once part of the bride-price of Cadmus, as a bribe for her advocacy. Amphiaraus reluctantly agreed to join the doomed undertaking, but aware of his wife's corruption, asked his sons, Alcmaeon and Amphilochus, to avenge his inevitable death by killing her, should he not return. On the way to the battle, Amphiaraus repeatedly warned the other warriors that the expedition would fail, and blamed Tydeus for starting it. For this, he would eventually prevent the dying Tydeus from being immortalized by Athena, by giving him the still-living severed head of his foe Melanippus, whose brains Tydeus devoured along with his last breath, revolting the goddess. (This scene, as rendered by Statius, provided the model for Dante's own seminal account of Ugolino gnawing on Ruggieri's skull in Cantos XXXII and XXXIII of the Inferno.) At some point, while the allies of Polyneices sat down to feast, an eagle swooped down and grabbed Amphiaraus's spear, taking it to a great height and then letting it drop on the earth. The spear was fixed in the soil, and transformed into a laurel tree.

In the battle, Amphiaraus sought to flee from Periclymenus, the "very famous" son of Poseidon, who wanted to kill him, but Zeus threw his thunderbolt, and the earth opened to swallow and conceal Amphiaraus and his charioteer Baton – right on the same spot the laurel had grown from his spear – and his chariot, before Periclymenus could stab him in the back and thereby disgrace his honor. Thus becoming a chthonic hero, Amphiaraus was later propitiated and consulted at his sanctuary.

Alcmaeon killed his mother when Amphiaraus died. He was pursued by the Erinyes as he fled across Greece, eventually landing at the court of King Phegeus, who gave him his daughter Alphesiboea in marriage. Exhausted, Alcmaeon asked an oracle how to avoid the Erinyes and was told that he needed to stop where the sun was not shining when he killed his mother. That was the mouth of the river Achelous, which had been silted up. Achelous himself, god of that river, promised him his daughter, Callirrhoe in marriage if Alcmaeon would retrieve the necklace and clothes which Eriphyle wore when she persuaded Amphiaraus to take part in the battle. Alcmaeon had given these jewels to Phegeus who, outraged, had his sons kill Alcmaeon when he discovered Alcmaeon's plan.

== Legacy ==
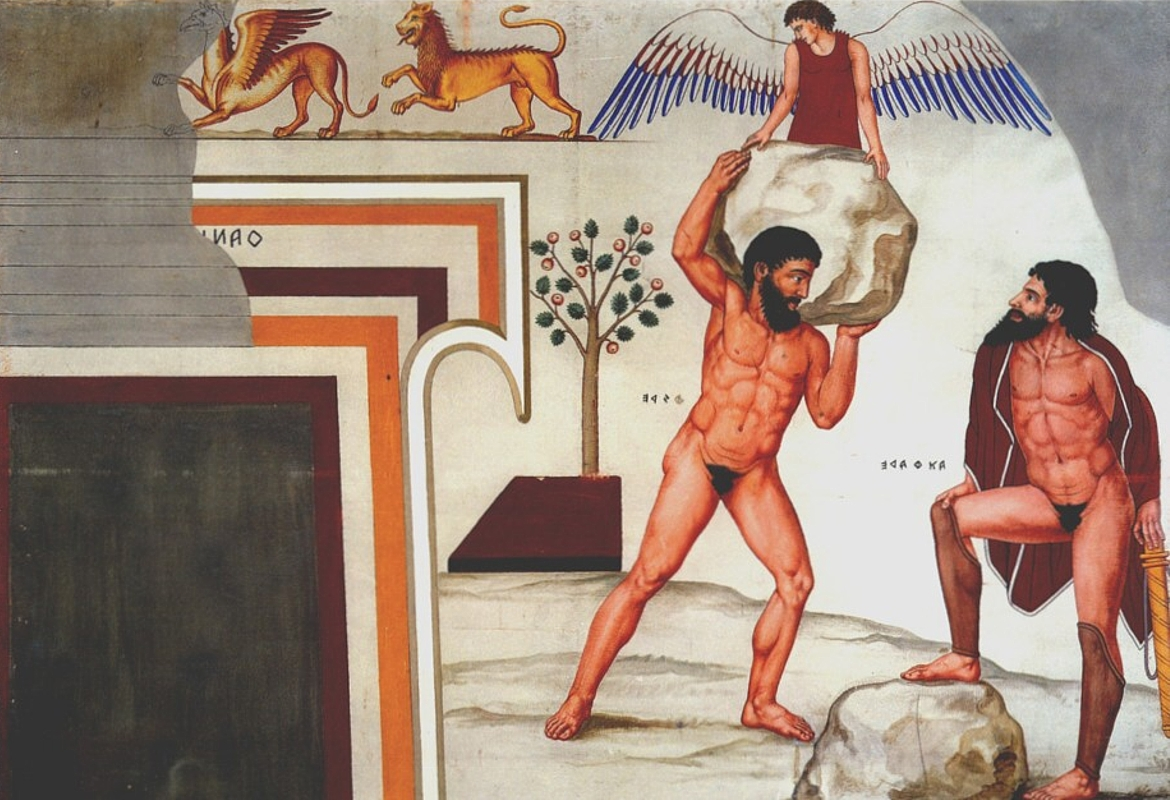
Sisyphus and Amphiaraus, copy of mural in François Tomb from Vulci made in 4th century BC.

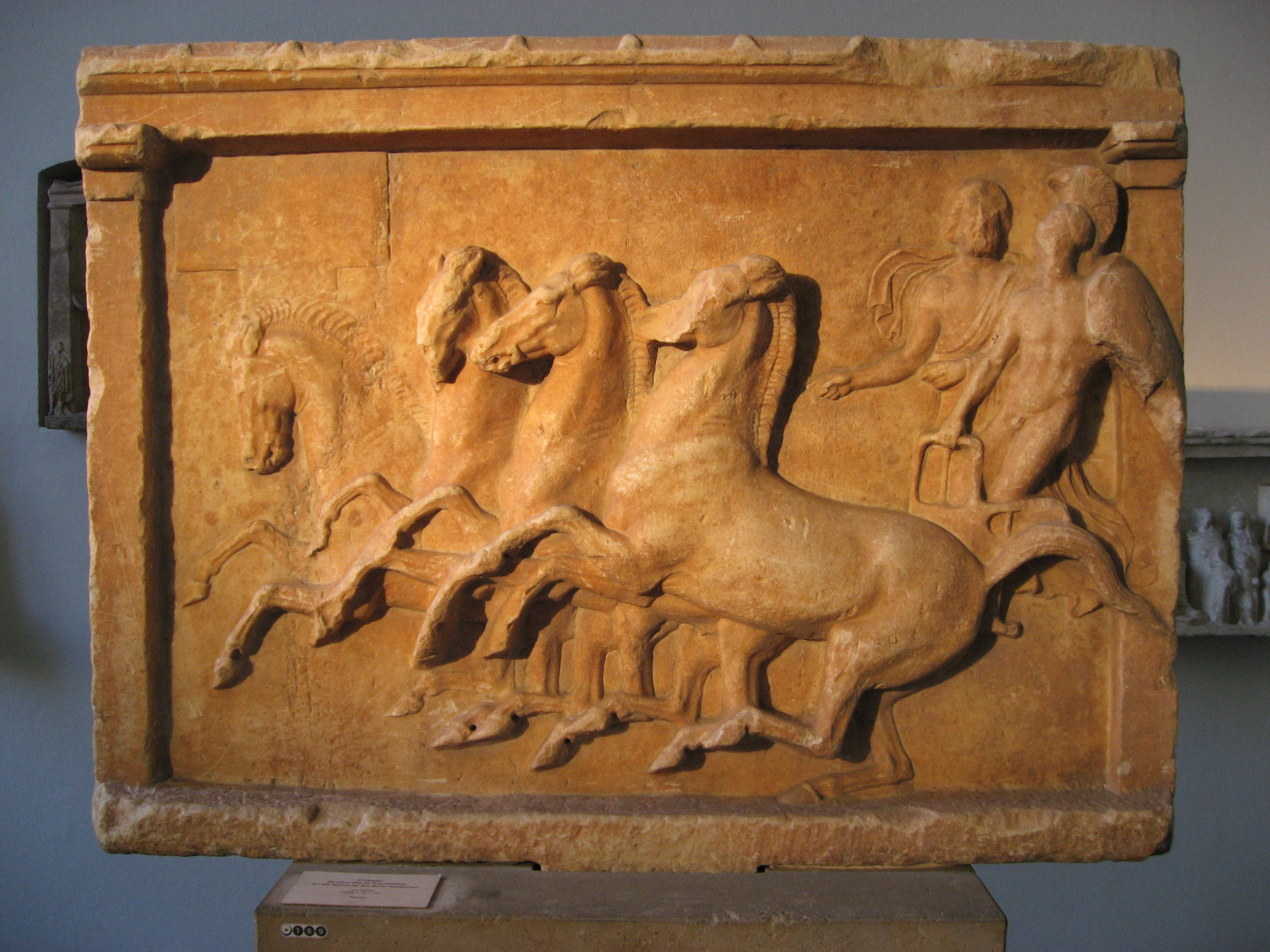
Marble votive relief of a chariot race, from Oropos, beginning of the 4th century BCE (Pergamonmuseum, Berlin).

In a sanctuary at the Amphiareion of Oropos, northwest of Attica, Amphiaraus was worshipped with a hero cult. He was considered a healing and fortune-telling god and was associated with Asclepius. The healing and fortune-telling aspect of Amphiaraus came from his ancestry: he descended from the great seer Melampus. After making a sacrifice of a few coins, or sometimes a ram, at the temple, a petitioner slept inside and received a dream detailing the solution to the problem. Games, called the Amphiaria (ἀμφιαράϊα), were celebrated in his honour there.

Etruscan tradition inherited by the Romans is doubtless the origin of a son of Amphiaraus named Catillus, who escaped from the slaughter at Thebes and led an expedition to Italy. There he founded a colony which would become the city of Tibur (now Tivoli), named after his eldest son, Tiburtus.

== Philosophy ==
In the Python, the first book to describe Pyrrhonist philosophy, the book's author, Timon of Phlius first meets Pyrrho on the grounds of the temple of Amphiaraus. The symbolism of this may be due to Pyrrho being a member of the Clytidae, a clan of seers in Elis who interpreted the oracles of the Temple of Zeus at Olympia. The founder of the clan was claimed to be Clytius, the grandson of Amphiaraus.

== Popular culture ==
- In March 1815 Franz Schubert set "Amphiaraos," a poem by Theodor Körner, as a lied for voice and piano, D 166. It was first published in the Franz Schubert's Works edition in 1894. The New Schubert Edition included the song in Series IV, Volume 8.
- In Dante Alighieri's Inferno, King Amphiaraus was seen in the Sorcerers' section of Hell's Circle of Fraud where his action of foreseeing his death is mentioned.
- In John Lydgate's Siege of Thebes, Amphiorax, foreseeing the future, attempts to hide from the Greeks when they seek his advice but is given up by his wife, who in Lydgate is torn between her promise to him and her womanly duty of honesty.
