= Aeolia (mythology) =

Greek mythological figure

In Greek mythology, Aeolia (Ancient Greek: Αἰολία) was the daughter of Amythaon and wife of Calydon, eponym of the city in Aetolia. She had two daughters: Epicaste, wife of Agenor, and Protogeneia, mother of Oxylus by Ares.
