= Amythaon =

Ancient Greek mythological figure

A sculpture of an old man, tentatively identified as Amythaon, from the eastern pediment of the temple of Zeus at Olympia, Greece, fifth century BC.

In Greek mythology, Amythaon (/ˌæməˈθeɪɒn/; Ancient Greek: Ἀμυθάων, gen.: Ἀμυθάονος) is the son of Cretheus, the king of Iolcus.

== Genealogy ==
Amythaon is the son of King Cretheus of Iolcus and Tyro, the daughter of King Salmoneus of Elis. He was the brother of Aeson and Pheres. Amythaon dwelt at Pylos in Messenia.

His wife is either Eidomene or Aglaia, and his children are Bias, Melampus, Aeolia and Perimele. According to Dieuchidas, by Dorippe, he was the father of Melampus.

== Mythology ==
According to Pindar, he and several other members of his family went to Iolcus to intercede with Pelias on behalf of Jason. Pausanias mentioned him among those to whom the restoration of the Olympic Games was ascribed. A part of Elis was thought to have been named Amythaonia after him.
