= Naubolus (mythology) =

In Greek mythology, the name Naubolus (/ˈnɔːbələs/; Ancient Greek: Ναύβολος) may refer to:

- Naubolus of Phocis, son of Ornytus (or of Hippasus), and King of Phocis. By Perineike, daughter of Hippomachus, he became the father of the Argonaut Iphitos, and also of Antiphateia, who married Crisus.
- Naubolus, father of Pylon, king of Oechalia. The latter's daughter Antiope was the mother, by Eurytus, of Iole, Didaeon, Deioneus, Toxeus, Clytius, Molion and another Iphitos, of whom the last two are also counted among the Argonauts.
- Naubolus of Argos, who belonged to the lineage that linked the two figures of the name Nauplius: Nauplius I - Proetus - Lernus - Naubolus - Clytoneus (Clytius) - Nauplius II (the Argonaut).
- Naubolus, a Phaeacian, father of Euryalus.
