= Antiope (daughter of Pylon) =

Ιn Greek mythology, Antiope (/ænˈtaɪ.əpi/; Ancient Greek: Ἀντιόπη, romanized: Antiópē, lit. 'derived from αντι anti 'against, compared to, like' and οψ ops 'voice' or 'confronting') was the daughter of Pylon or Pylaon. She was married to Eurytus, by whom she became the mother of the Argonauts Iphitus and Clytius, also of Toxeus, Deioneus, Molion, Didaeon and a very beautiful daughter, Iole. She is also called Antioche.
