= Deipyrus =

In Greek mythology, Deïpyrus (Ancient Greek: Δηΐπυρόν) was an Achaean soldier who participated in the Trojan War. According to one scholiast, some say that he was from Pylos, while others called him a brother to Meriones, a Cretan hero.

== Mythology ==
Deipyrus was one of the seven captains of the sentinels, together with Ascalaphus, Ialmenus, Meriones, Aphareus and Lycomedes, who were commanded by Thrasymedes, son of Nestor.

He was killed by the prophet Helenus, son of King Priam and Hecuba, during the siege of Troy.

Then in close fight Helenus smote Deïpyrus on the temple with a great Thracian sword, and tore away his helm, and the helm, dashed from his head, fell to the ground, and one of the Achaeans gathered it up as it rolled amid the feet of the fighters; and down upon the eyes of Deïpyrus came the darkness of night, and enfolded him.
