= Molion =

In Greek mythology, Molion (Ancient Greek: Μολίων) may refer to the following personages:

- Molion, an Oechalian prince as son of King Eurytus and Antiope or Antioche and brother of Clytius and Toxeus. All three were slain by Heracles. His other siblings were Iole, Deioneus, Didaeon and Iphitos.
- Molion, a Trojan squire of Thymbraeus, son of the seer Laocoon. He was killed by the hero Odysseus.
- Molion, an Achaean warrior who was killed by the Amazon Queen Penthesilia.
