= Iphitus (son of Eurytus) =

Son of Eurytus in Greek mythology

In Greek mythology, Iphitus (/ˈɪfɪtəs/; Ancient Greek: Ἴφιτος, romanized: Íphitos) was an Oechalian prince and one of the Argonauts. He was killed by Heracles during a fit of anger.

== Family ==
Iphitus was the son of King Eurytus of Oechalia and Antiope or Antioche, and thus brother to Iole, Toxeus, Deioneus, Molion, Didaeon and Clytius, also an Argonaut. He was a descendant of Oxylus.

== Mythology ==
It is told that after Heracles finished his Twelve Labours, he came to Oechalia to compete in archery for the hand of Iole; he won and yet he was refused the bride by Eurytus and his sons (all except Iphitus, who said that Iole should be given to Heracles), on the ground that he might once more kill his offspring as he had done to his children by Megara. Shortly after some cattle were stolen by the notorious thief Autolycus, and Heracles was held responsible; but Iphitus did not believe it and, having gone to meet him, he invited him to seek the cattle with him. Heracles promised to do so but suddenly he went mad again and he threw Iphitus from the walls of Tiryns, killing him. According to one version of the myth, Iphitus is also said to have been a lover of Heracles.

During his search for the cattle, Iphitus met Odysseus in Messenia, befriended him, and gave Odysseus his father Eurytus's bow. It was this bow that Odysseus used to kill the suitors who had wanted to take his wife, Penelope.
