= Aphareus =

Aphareus (Ancient Greek: Ἀφαρεύς) may refer to the following figures.

- Aphareus, a Messenian king, son of Perieres and Gorgophone.
- Aphareus, a Centaur that attended the wedding of Pirithous and Hippodamia. In the battle initiated by the Centaurs, he tried to throw a rock at his opponents but was killed by Theseus.
- Aphareus, a Greek warrior in the Trojan War who was one of the seven captains of the sentinels along with, Thrasymedes, Ascalaphus, Ialmenus, Meriones, Deipyrus and Lycomedes. He was the son of Caletor. Aeneas leapt upon Aphareus and struck him on the throat with a sharp spear, slaying the Achaean warrior eventually.
- Aphareus, an Athenian rhetor and tragedian, son of the sophist Hippias and Plathane.
