= Didaeon =

In Greek mythology: Oechalian prince

In Greek mythology, Didaeon was an Oechalian prince as son of King Eurytus and Antiope or Antioche and brother of Clytius, Toxeus, Iphitos, Deioneus, Molion and Iole.
