= 836 Jole =

Asteroid

Discovery
- Discovered by: M. F. Wolf
- Discovery site: Heidelberg Obs.
- Discovery date: 23 September 1916

Designations
- Pronunciation: /ˈdʒoʊliː/ JOH-lee
- Named after: Iole wife of Heracles (Greek mythology)
- Alternative designations: A916 SJ · A903 QA; 1916 AF · 1903 QA
- Minor planet category: main-belt · (inner) background

Orbital characteristics
- Epoch 31 May 2020 (JD 2459000.5)
- Uncertainty parameter 0
- Observation arc: 116.07 yr (42,394 d)
- Aphelion: 2.5751 AU
- Perihelion: 1.8048 AU
- Semi-major axis: 2.1900 AU
- Eccentricity: 0.1759
- Orbital period (sidereal): 3.24 yr (1,184 d)
- Mean anomaly: 340.45°
- Mean motion: 0° 18^{m} 14.76^{s} / day
- Inclination: 4.8449°
- Longitude of ascending node: 199.76°
- Argument of perihelion: 179.78°

Physical characteristics
- Mean diameter: 5.757±0.062 km
- Synodic rotation period: 9.615±0.005 h (Note: Lightcurve plot of (836) Jole by Daniel Coley at the DanHenge Observatory (U80). Rotation period of 9.615±0.005 hours with a brightness amplitude of 0.37±0.02 mag. Quality code is 3. Summary figures at the LCDB and CS3.)
- Geometric albedo: 0.194±0.028
- Spectral type: S (SDSS-MOC)
- Absolute magnitude (H): 13.20

836 Jole (prov. designation: A916 SJ or 1916 AF) is a bright background asteroid from the inner regions of the asteroid belt. It was discovered on 23 September 1916, by German astronomer Max Wolf at the Heidelberg Observatory in southwest Germany. The stony S-type asteroid has a rotation period of 9.6 hours and measures approximately 5.8 kilometers (3.6 miles) in diameter. It was named after Iole, wife of Heracles from Greek mythology.

== Orbit and classification ==
Located in the orbital region of the Flora family, Jole is a non-family asteroid of the main belt's background population when applying the hierarchical clustering method to its proper orbital elements. It orbits the Sun in the inner asteroid belt at a distance of 1.8–2.6 AU once every 3 years and 3 months (1,184 days; semi-major axis of 2.19 AU). Its orbit has an eccentricity of 0.18 and an inclination of 5° with respect to the ecliptic. The asteroid was first observed as A903 QA at Heidelberg Observatory on 24 August 1903, where the body's observation arc begins on the following night.

== Naming ==
Based on Lutz Schmadel's own research, this minor planet was named from Greek mythology, after Iole, daughter of King Eurytus of Oechalia and wife by force of divine hero Heracles. The naming was not mentioned in The Names of the Minor Planets by Paul Herget in 1955.

== Physical characteristics ==
In the SDSS-based taxonomy, Jole is a common, stony S-type asteroid.

=== Rotation period ===
In September 2010, a rotational lightcurve of Jole was obtained from photometric observations by Daniel Coley at the DanHenge Observatory (U80) at the Center for Solar System Studies. Lightcurve analysis gave a well-defined rotation period of 9.615±0.005 hours with a brightness variation of 0.37±0.02 magnitude (U=3).

=== Diameter and albedo ===
According to the survey carried out by the NEOWISE mission of NASA's Wide-field Infrared Survey Explorer (WISE), Jole measures 5.757±0.062 kilometers in diameter and its surface has an albedo of 0.194±0.028. Alternative mean-diameters published by the WISE team includes (5.142±0.038 km) and (5.62±0.17 km) with corresponding albedos of (0.2402±0.0283) and (0.293±0.029). The Collaborative Asteroid Lightcurve Link assumes an albedo for a Florian asteroid of 0.24 and calculates a diameter of 6.21 kilometers based on an absolute magnitude of 13.2.
