= Lycomedes of Thebes =

In Greek mythology, Lycomedes (Ancient Greek: Λυκομήδης Lykomedes) was a Theban armed sentry with Thrasymedes, son of Nestor during the Trojan War.

== Family ==
Lycomedes was the son of Theban regent, Creon of Thebes and possibly his wife Eurydice or Henioche, and thus, the brother of Menoeceus (Megareus), Haemon, Megara, Pyrrha and Henoiche.

== Mythology ==
Lycomedes fought on the side of the Argives in the Trojan War. No real significant background is given about him in the Iliad. He was listed among the younger leaders and was not a king but of second rank. In the tenth year of the struggle when the Trojans have surrounded the Greeks in their ship's camp, Lycomedes stood as one of the seven guard commanders at nighttime in Book IX at the Greek wall. Other six captains of the sentinels were Thrasymedes, Ascalaphus, Ialmenus, Meriones, Aphareus and Deïpyrus.

When Telamonian Ajax and Teucer had to leave their position on Hector's assault on the wall to deal with Sarpedon's division, Aias ordered Lykomedes to help Ajax the Lesser to help deal with Hector's press. He also continued in action when Hector and the Trojan forces broke through the Greek wall. A day later, when Patroclus threw himself back into battle, the Greeks knew how to break through the encirclement and the comrade-in-law of Lycomedes, Liocritus was killed. With great sadness, Lycomedes who saw what had happen, rushed off on his dead friend. Once there, he cast of his bright spear to smote Trojan leader Apisaon in the liver below the midriff and straightway loosed his knees.

Later on, Lycomedes was one of the Greeks who takes gifts for Achilles from the tent of King Agamemnon as these two decisions to settle their dispute. During later fights, Lycomedes was wounded on his wrist or head and ankle by the Trojan Agenor.
