= Melanippe (daughter of Aeolus) =

Mythical daughter of Aeolus

In Greek mythology, Melanippe (/mɛləˈnɪpiː/; Ancient Greek: Μελανίππη, romanized: Melanippê, lit. 'black mare' or 'black horse'), also known as Arne or Antiopa, was the daughter of Aeolus and the precedent Melanippe (or else daughter of Hippotes or of Desmontes). She was the mother by Poseidon, of the twins Aeolus (Hellen) and Boeotus.

== Mythology ==
There are various accounts of what happened to Melanippe after the birth of her sons. In one version, when her father discovered her pregnancy, he handed her over to a man from Metapontium, who was childless and adopted her sons as his own. When the boys grew up, a civil war began in Metapontium and they seized the kingship. They also killed Autolyte, their adoptive father's wife, for having mistreated their natural mother. Strabo cites two other accounts, in which Melanippe was said to have been handed over either to Metabus or to Dius.

In another version of Melanippe's story, when her father discovered that she had given birth to twins, he blinded her, shut her in a prison and ordered that the babies be exposed. However, they were suckled by a cow and survived. They were subsequently rescued by shepherds, who later gave them to Theano, wife of King Metapontus of Icaria, as she was looking for a baby to present to her husband as her own, fearing that he would expel her if she had no children to him. Later, however, she did give birth to two sons, but Metapontus was already more fond of the sons of Melanippe. So when they grew up, Theano instructed her natural sons to kill Aeolus and Boeotus during hunt. The two, however, defended themselves and, with the aid of Poseidon, killed Theano's sons. She then committed suicide and the brothers fled to the shepherds who had found them. Having found out about their true descent from Poseidon, they released their natural mother Melanippe from prison, and Poseidon restored her sight.

Two tragedies by Euripides, Melanippe The Prisoner and Melanippe The Philosopher, were dedicated to this character.
