= Eurytios Krater =

Vessel from Ancient Greece

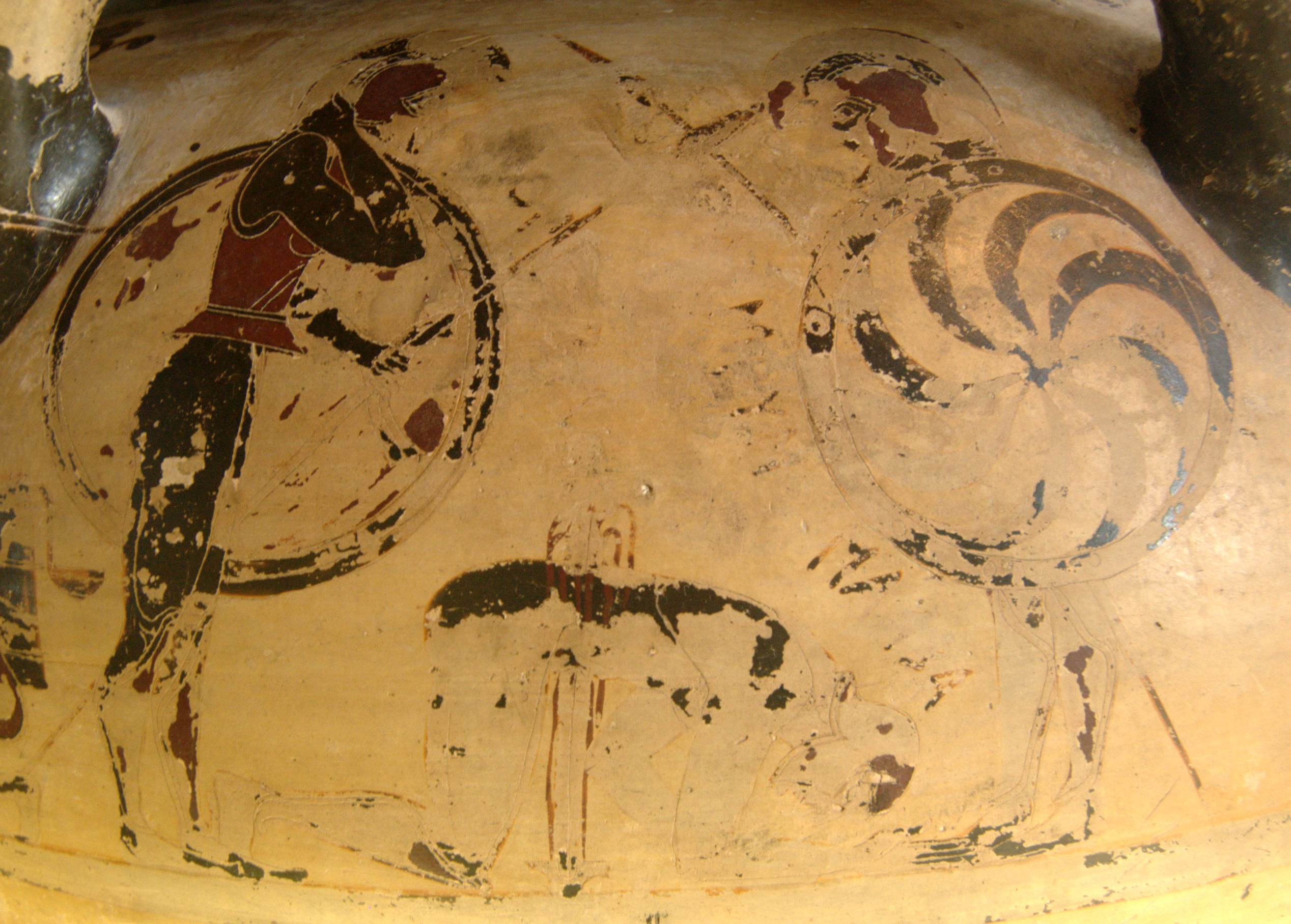
Suicide of Ajax.

Eurytios Krater (also Eurytos Krater, Krater of Eurytus) is the name given to a famous Early Corinthian column krater. The Eurytios krater is dated to about 600 BC. The vase combined the possibilities of the recently invented or introduced styles of black-figure vase painting and polychrome painting in terms of shape and decoration of the vase with a particularly high quality of artisanship.

Found at Cerveteri and now on display in the Louvre, the front of the krater depicts Eurytus (Eurytos) feasting Herakles. This scene, after which the vase was named, is unique in Corinthian vase painting. In addition to the painting itself, several of the figures are named by accompanying inscriptions. The back is decorated with a battle scene, possibly from the Trojan War. Below the handles are a kitchen scene and the probably earliest depiction of the suicide of Ajax. The lower frieze depicts herons, animals and a deer hunt.

Reconstructed illustration of the motive the suicide of Ajax

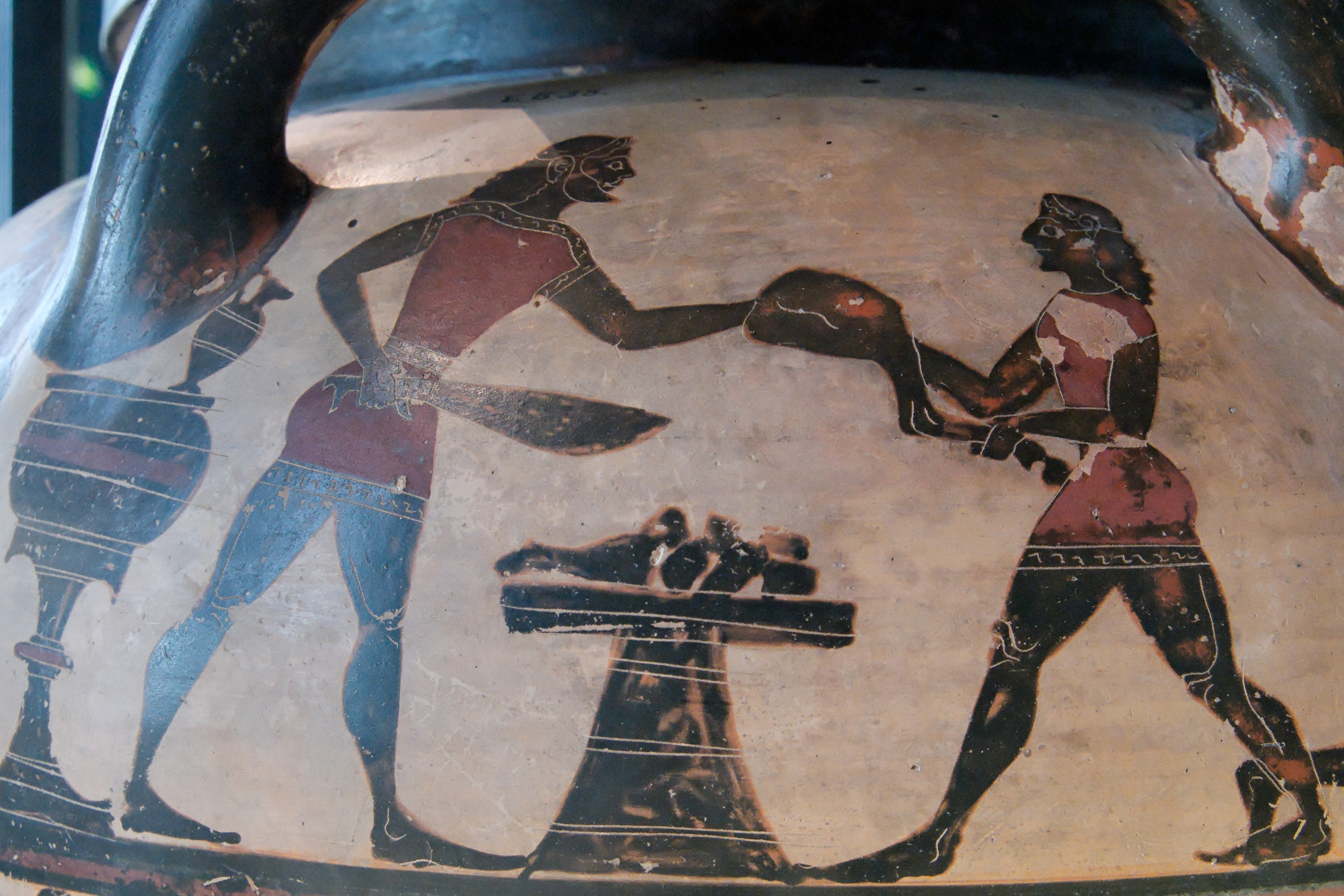
Front: preparations for the symposion

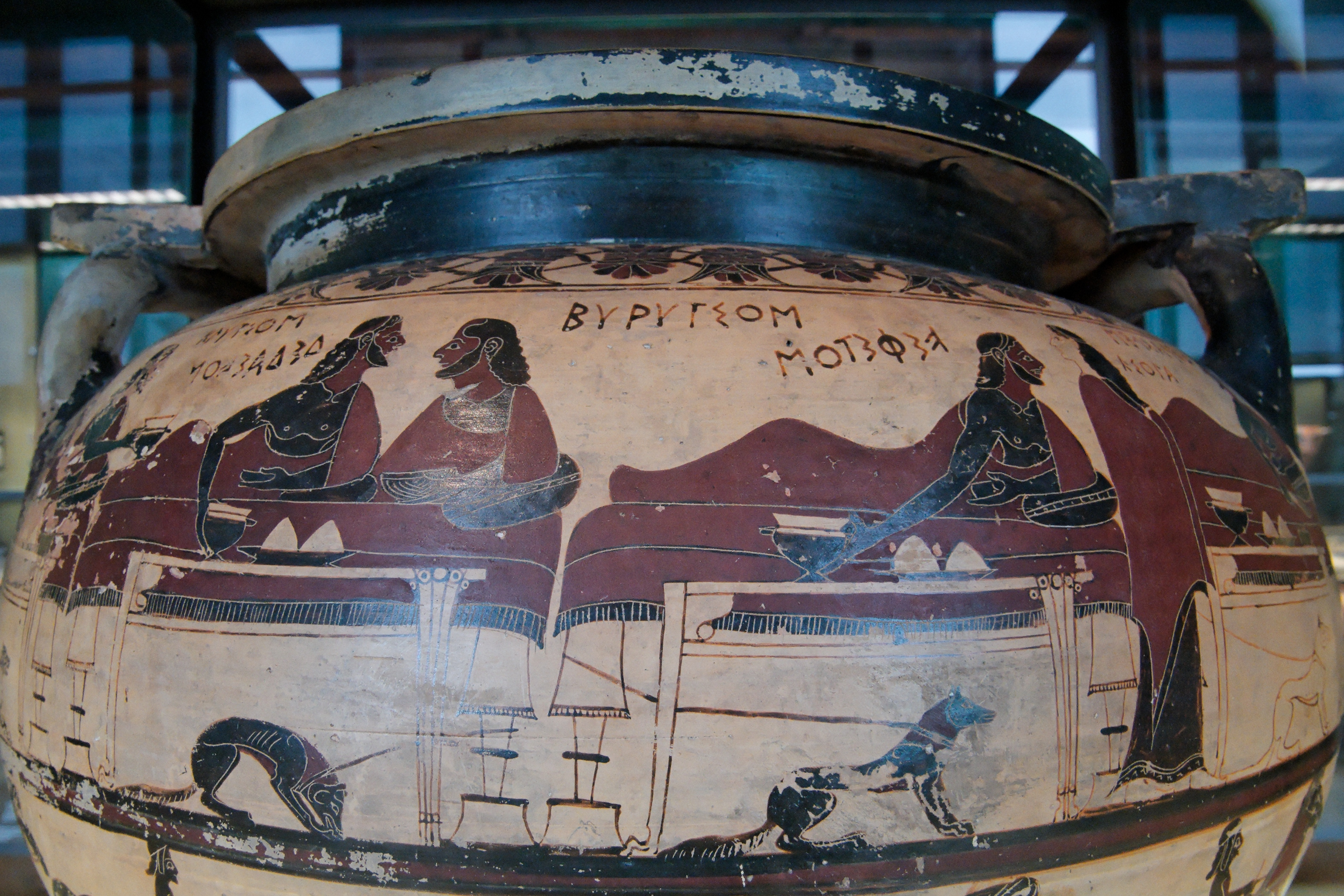
Front: Iole, Eurytus and Herakles feasting

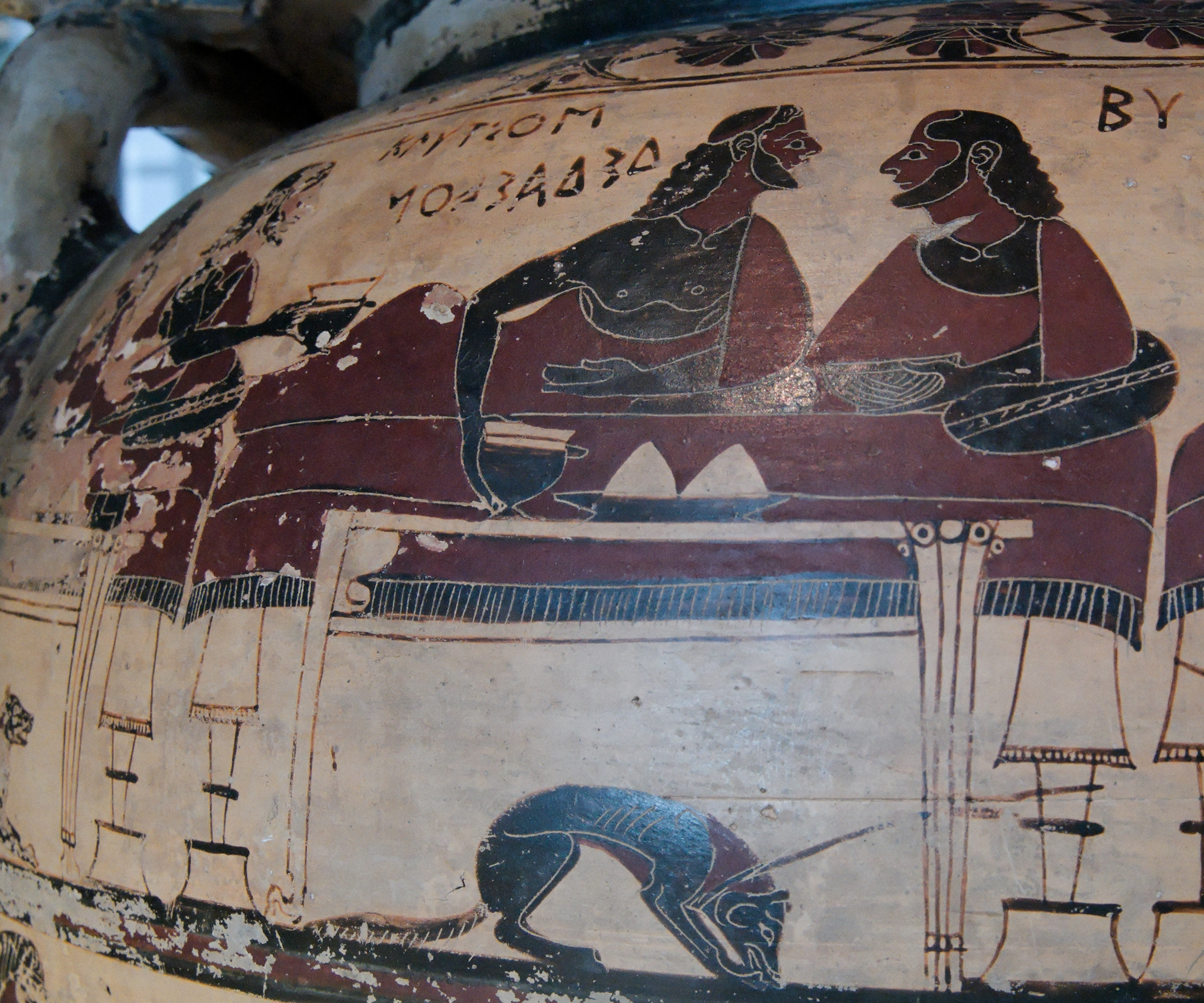
Front: detail

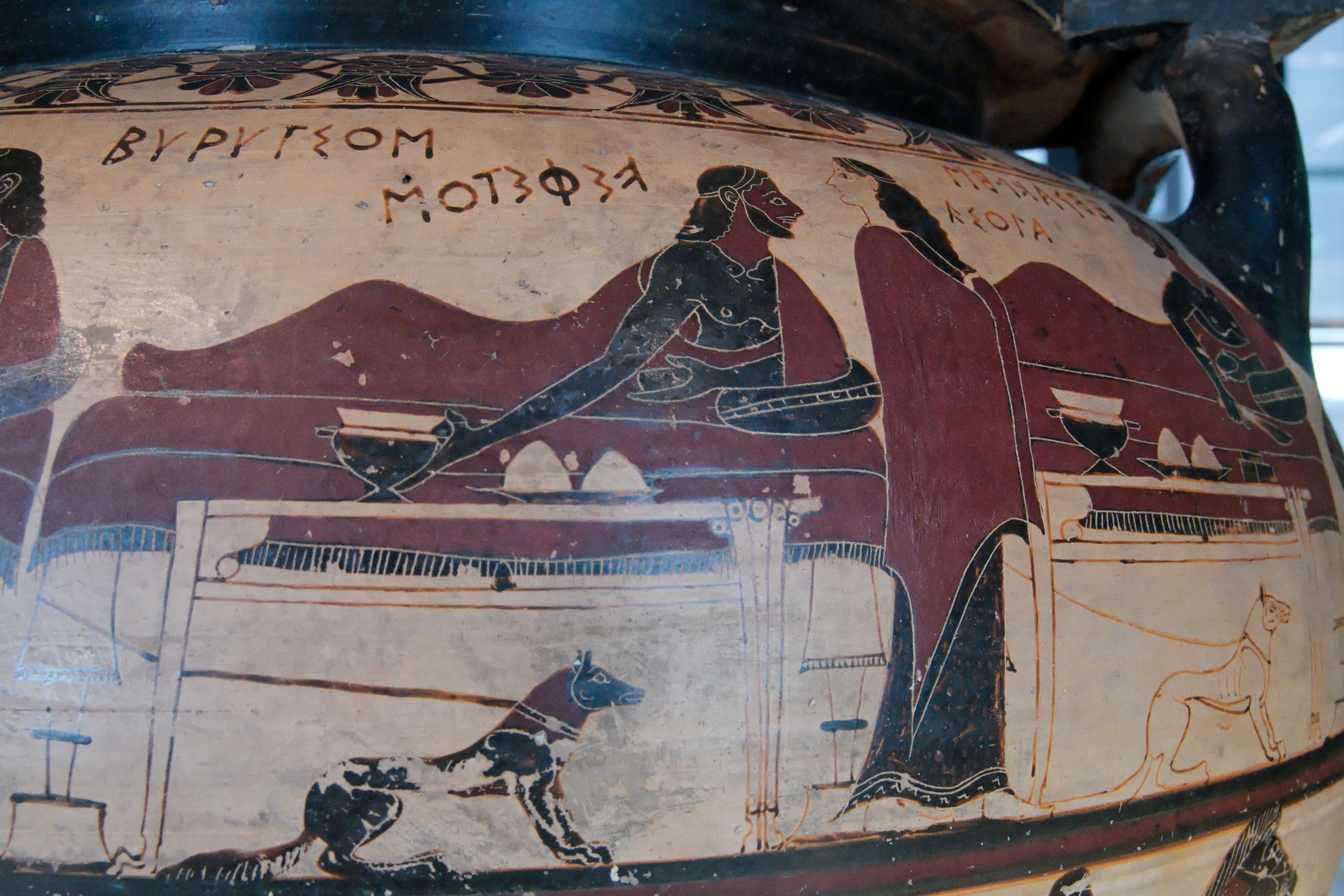
Front: detail

== Bibliography ==
- Matthias Steinhart: Astarita-Krater, in Der Neue Pauly Vol. 4 (1998), Col. 305
