= Theano (wife of Metapontus) =

Queen of Icaria in Greek mythology

In Greek mythology, Theano (/θiˈeɪnoʊ/; Ancient Greek: Θεανώ, romanized: Theanṓ, lit. 'goddess', 'divine', or 'divine one') is the wife of King Metapontus and queen of Icaria, a small island in the eastern Aegean Sea. The childless Theano adopted the twin sons of Poseidon and Melanippe, claiming to her husband that they were her own. The truth behind their parentage would be revealed years later. Theano played a central role as the main antagonist in the ancient Greek play Captive Melanippe by Athenian dramatist Euripides, which is not preserved.

== Family ==
Nothing is known about Theano's lineage or life before her marriage to Metapontus. She was the stepmother of Aeolus and Boeotus.

== Mythology ==
Theano married Metapontus, the king of the island of Icaria, but could bear him no sons. Metapontus threatened her that if she did not give birth to heirs, he would drive her out of his kingdom, so Theano tasked some servants to find her an infant she could pass as her own. The servants found and brought her twin boys, the sons of Poseidon and Melanippe, who had been exposed by their maternal grandfather. Theano lied to Metapontus that she had borne the infants (called Aeolus and Boeotus), who gladly accepted them as sons and heirs.

But as fate had it, Theano soon fell pregnant and was delivered of twin boys of her own, but Metapontus continued to favour those he deemed his ‘firstborns’, who grew to be very handsome. But Theano wished to see her own blood inherit their father's kingdom, so while Metapontus was busy during a sacrifice to Artemis Metapontina, she secretly revealed to her sons the true parentage of their adopted brothers, and instructed them to kill them during the hunt with hunting knives.

When all four had gone to the mountains, Theano's sons did as told, but Aeolus and Boeotus were able to overpower and kill them with the aid of their biological father Poseidon. When the lifeless bodies of her sons were presented to Theano, she opted to end her life with the use of a hunting knife. Aeolus and Boeotus would eventually learn the truth from Poseidon himself and reunite with their mother Melanippe, who then married the widowed Metapontus and became the new queen of Icaria.

== In ancient Greek drama ==
The myth of Melanippe, her sons and the adoptive royal couple was the subject of Captive Melanippe, a lost tragedy by Athenian playwright Euripides who appears to have followed a plot similar to the version related by Hyginus, though no following to the letter. Although Hyginus writes 'Icaria', the setting of the events must have been Italia (particularly the region of Bruttium and south Lucania), in accordance with other versions and the town of Metapontium being situated there.

It shared the elements of the infants being left to die, and as adults surviving an attempt on their lives during hunting. The play also likely included the element from other authors of Melanippe living as a slave in the palace and being abused by the queen. Another difference between Euripides and Hyginus seems to be that in the play, the queen remained childless, and her sons are supplanted by her brothers in her scheme to kill Melanippe's sons. After the failed ambush, the queen either killed herself or was murdered by the twins, who then reunite with their mother.

== See also ==
- Themisto
- Aëdon

== Bibliography ==
- Bell, Robert E. (1991). Women of Classical Mythology: A Biographical Dictionary. ABC-Clio. ISBN 9780874365818.
- Euripides (1995). Collard, C.; Cropp, M. J.; Lee, K. H. (eds.). Selected Fragmentary Plays. Vol. 1. Oxford, UK: Oxford University Press. ISBN 978-0-85668-619-1.
- Graves, Robert (1960). The Greek Myths. Harmondsworth, London, England: Penguin Books. ISBN 978-0143106715.
- Grimal, Pierre (1987). The Dictionary of Classical Mythology. Wiley-Blackwell. ISBN 0-631-13209-0.
- Hyginus, Fabulae from The Myths of Hyginus translated and edited by Mary Grant. University of Kansas Publications in Humanistic Studies. Online version at the Topos Text Project.
- March, Jennifer R. (May 31, 2014). Dictionary of Classical Mythology. Oxbow Books. ISBN 978-1-78297-635-6.
- Smith, William (1873). A Dictionary of Greek and Roman Biography and Mythology. London, UK: John Murray, printed by Spottiswoode and Co. Online version at the Perseus.tufts library.
- Theodorakopoulos, Ioannes (1972). Νέα Ελληνική Εγκυκλοπαίδεια [New Greek Encyclopedia] (in Greek). Vol. 13. Athens, Greece: Chares Patsis.
- Thorburn, John E. Jr (2005). The Facts on File Companion to Classical Drama. New York City, NY: Infobase Publishing. ISBN 0-8160-5202-6.
- Wright, Matthew (December 13, 2018). The Lost Plays of Greek Tragedy. Vol. 2: Aeschylus, Sophocles and Euripides. London, NYC: Bloomsbury Publishing. ISBN 978-1-4742-7646-7.
