= Clytius =

Set of mythological Greek characters

Clytius (/ˈklɪʃiəs/; Ancient Greek: Κλυτίος, romanized: Klytios), also spelled Klythios, Clytios, and Klytius, is the name of multiple people in Greek mythology:

- Clytius, one of the Giants, sons of Gaia, killed by Hecate during the Gigantomachy, the battle of the Giants versus the Olympian gods.
- Clytius, an alternative name for Clytoneus, the son of Naubolus of Argos and father of Nauplius II.
- Clytius, son of Agriopas and grandson of Cyclops. He fought in the war between Eumolpus and Eleusis and fell alongside Eumolpus' son Immaradus and Egremus, son of Eurynomus.
- Clytius, the Athenian father of Pheno who married King Lamedon of Sicyon. Ianiscus, descendant of this Clytius, became king in Sicyon after Adrastus.
- Clytius, a man killed by Perseus in the battle against Phineus.
- Clytius, a warrior in the army of Dionysus during the god's Indian campaign. He was killed by Corymbasus.
- Clytius, an Argonaut and an Oechalian prince as son of King Eurytus and Antiope or Antioche, and thus brother to Iole, Toxeus, Deioneus, Molion, Didaeon and Iphitos. According to Hyginus, he was killed by Aeetes, if the text is not corrupt; according to Diodorus Siculus, however, he was killed by Heracles during the latter's war against Eurytus.
- Clytius, in a rare version of the myth, a son of Phineus and brother of Polymedes: the two brothers killed Phineus' second, Phrygian, wife (Idaea?) at the instigation of Cleopatra.
- Clytius, a Trojan prince as the son of King Laomedon and brother of the later ruler Priam. He was also one of the Elders of Troy during the siege of the city. By Laothoe, he was the father of Caletor, Procleia and Pronoe or Pronome, of whom the latter was the mother of Polydamas by Panthous.
- Clytius, son of Alcmaeon and Alphesiboea. He moved from Psophis to Elis in order to escape his mother's vengeful brothers. The Clytidae, a clan of soothsayers, claimed descent from him. According to Stephanus of Byzantium, his mother was Triphyle, the eponym of Triphylia.
- Clytius, each of the three namesakes among the Suitors of Penelope: one from Dulichium, another from Same, and the third from Zacynthus. These men asked the hand in marriage of Penelope but suffered the same fate at the hands of the hero Odysseus. The latter shot all of them dead with the aid of Eumaeus, Philoetius, and Telemachus.
- Clytius, an attendant of Telemachus in Homer's Odyssey, the father of Telemachus' friend Peiraeus. Dolops, a Greek warrior killed by Hector in the Iliad, could also have been his son.
- Clytius, one of the sons of Aeolus who followed Aeneas to Italy and was killed by Turnus.
- Clytius, father of Euneus (one of those killed in the battle between Aeneas and Turnus).
- Clytius, a young soldier in the army of Turnus who was loved by Cydon in Virgil's Aeneid, and was killed by Aeneas.
- Clytius, father of Acmon and Menestheus from Lyrnessus, Phrygia.

To these can be added several figures not mentioned in extant literary sources and only known from various vase paintings:

- Clytius, a companion of Peleus present at the wrestling match between Peleus and Atalanta.
- Clytius, an arms-bearer of Tydeus present at the scene of murder of Ismene, on a vase from Corinth.
- Clytius, a barbarian-looking participant of a boar hunt, possibly the Calydonian hunt, on the Petersburg vase #1790.
- Clytius, a man standing in front of the enthroned Hygieia, on a vase by the Meidias Painter.
- Clytius, an epithet of Apollo, in an inscription.
