= Schedius =

Multiple Greek mythological figures

Schedius (Ancient Greek: Σχεδίος Skhedíos means 'near') was a name attributed to four individuals in Greek mythology.

- Schedius, son of Iphitus by Hippolyte or Thrasybule and brother of Epistrophus. He was counted among the suitors of Helen. In the Iliad, he and his brother lead the Phocians on the side of the Achaeans in the Trojan War, Schedius being commander of ten ships out of forty brought by both brothers. He was killed when Hector threw a spear at Ajax, who dodged it. Both brothers' bones were carried back and buried at Anticyra. Their tomb existed until Roman times. According to Pausanias, Schedius's icon was displayed at Delphi.
- Schedius, son of Perimedes, was a leader of the Phocians. He was killed by Hector.
- Schedius, a defender of Troy who was killed by Neoptolemus.
- Schedius, one of the suitors of Penelope who came from Dulichium along with other 56 wooers. He, with the other suitors, was shot dead by Odysseus with the assistance of Eumaeus, Philoetius, and Telemachus.
