= Thrasybule =

Greek mythological figure

In Greek mythology, Thrasybule or Thrasyboule (Ancient Greek: Θρασυβούλης) was the mother by King Iphitos of Schedius and Epistrophus, the leaders of the Phocians during the Trojan War. Otherwise, the mother of these men were Hippolyte.
