= Charops (mythology) =

Several figures in Greek mythology

In Greek mythology, the name Charops (Ancient Greek: Χάροψ, romanized: Khárops, lit. 'from χαροπός, kharopós, "flashing, amber-eyed"') may refer to:

- Charops, also called Charopus, king of Syme, father of Nireus by the nymph Aglaia. His son was the second most handsome Achaean warrior after Achilles.
- Charops, father of Oeagrus. He warned Dionysus of Lycurgus plotting against him, and was granted in reward with the knowledge of secret rites; the kingdom of Thrace was also handed over to him after the defeat of Lycurgus.
- Charops, son of Hippasus and brother of Socus. He was a Lycian soldier who followed their leader, Sarpedon, to fight in the Trojan War. He was slain by the Greek hero Odysseus during the siege of Troy.
- Charops, husband of Oia, the daughter of Cephalus and eponym of the deme Oia, Attica.
- Charops, one of Actaeon's dogs.
- Charops, a surname of Heracles, under which he had a statue near mount Laphystion on the spot where he was believed to have brought forth Cerberus from Hades.

== See also ==
- Naming citation for Jovian asteroid 16070 Charops
