= Epistrophus (mythology) =

Set of mythological Greek characters

In Greek mythology, Epistrophus (/ɪˈpɪstrəfəs/: Ancient Greek: Ἐπίστροφος) may refer to:

- Epistrophus, son of Iphitus by Hippolyte or Thrasybule and brother of Schedius. He was counted among the suitors of Helen. Together with his brother he led the Phocians on the side of the Achaeans in the Trojan War, commanding forty ships. Epistrophus was killed at the Trojan war by Hector. Both brothers' bones were carried back and buried at Anticyra. Their purported tomb existed until the Roman times.
- Epistrophus, an ally of the Trojans, leader of the Halizones.
- Epistrophus, son of Euneus, grandson of Selepus and brother of Mynes; both brothers were killed by Achilles during the latter's invasion in Lyrnessus.
