= Antioche (mythology) =

In Greek mythology, Antioche (Ancient Greek: Ἀντιόχεια, lit. 'against support', 'resistant' or 'holding out against') may refer to the following characters:

- Antioche, another name for Antiope, queen of Oechalia as the wife of King Eurytus. By the latter, she became the mother of Didaeon, Clytius, Toxeus, Iphitus and Iole.
- Antioche, also called Antiope, was listed as one of the Amazons.
