= Arne (daughter of Aeolus) =

Greek mythological character

In Greek mythology, Arne (Ancient Greek: Ἄρνη, romanized: Árnē; pronounced /ˈɑːrniː/, AR-nee), also called Melanippe or Antiopa, was the daughter of Aeolus and Melanippe (also Hippe or Euippe), daughter of Chiron.

== Mythology ==
Arne was born as a foal as her mother had been transformed into a horse as a disguise, but was returned to the human form and renamed Arne. According to John Tzetzes, Arne was the nurse of the young Poseidon, who denied knowing where he was when Cronus came searching for him. Aeolus entrusted her to the care of one Desmontes. However, Poseidon fathered Aeolus and Boeotus with her while he was in the form of a bull. Enraged, Desmontes entombed and blinded her and placed her twin sons on Mount Pelion. She was later rescued by her sons and married king Metapontus of Icaria, and Poseidon restored her vision.

Through Boeotus, she was the ancestress of the Boeotians. A city named after her was recorded in the Iliad's Catalogue of Ships which has been tentatively identified with the ruins of Gla.

== See also ==
- Arne Sithonis, the princess also known as "Arne of Siphnos"
