= Caletor =

Set of mythological Greek characters

In Greek mythology, Caletor (Ancient Greek: Καλήτωρ) may refer to one of the following characters associated with the Trojan War:

- Caletor, one of the defenders of Troy. He was the son of Clytius and brother of Procleia. Caletor was killed by Ajax while trying to set fire to the ship of Protesilaus.
- Caletor, father of the Achaean soldier, Aphareus.
