= Hippasus (mythology) =

Set of characters in Greek mythology

In Greek mythology, Hippasus or Hippasos (Ancient Greek: Ἴππασος) is the name of fourteen characters.

- Hippasus, son of King Eurytus of Oechalia and one of the hunters of the Calydonian Boar.
- Hippasus from the Pellene district of the Peloponnese, father of Actor, Iphitus, Asterion, Amphion, and Naubolus. The latter four are otherwise ascribed different parentage.
- Hippasus, a Centaur. Killed by Theseus at the wedding of Pirithous and Hippodamia.
- Hippasus, a Trojan prince as one of the sons of Priam.
- Hippasus, a Thessalian killed by Agenor in the Trojan War.
- Hippasus, son of King Ceyx of Trachis and possibly, Alcyone, daughter of Aeolus, and thus, brother to Hylas, favorite of Heracles and Themistonoe, wife of Cycnus. Hippasus was killed in battle whilst fighting alongside Heracles against King Eurytus of Oechalia.
- Hippasus, son of Leucippe, one of the Minyades. He was killed by his mother and her sisters.
- Hippasus from Phlius opposed his fellow citizens, who wished to accede to the wishes of the Dorian Rhegnidas and make him their king. He and his fellow supporters fled to Samos. Hippasus is the ancestor of the philosopher Pythagoras, Pythagoras being the son of Mnesarchus, the son of Euphranor, the son of Hippasus.
- Hippasus, name shared by fathers of several heroes of the Trojan War:
  - of Hippomedon by the nymph Ocyrrhoe
  - of Charops and Socus
  - of Agelaus the Milesian
  - of Coeranus the Lycian
  - of Hypsenor
  - of Demoleon the Lacedaemonian
  - of Apisaon the Paeonian
  - of two nameless - only known by the patronymic Hippasides – charioteers:
    - the charioteer of Pammon (the son of Priam)
    - a Greek charioteer killed by Deiphobus.

== See also ==
- 17492 Hippasos, Jovian asteroid named after Hippasus
