= Toxeus =

Greek mythological figures with this name

In Greek mythology, the name Toxeus or Toxius (Ancient Greek: Τοξεύς, romanized: Toxeús, lit. 'bowman') refers to the following individuals:

- Toxius, son of Caelus (Uranus) who was the inventor of building with clay, it having been suggested to him from swallows' nests.
- Toxeus, a Pleuronian prince as the son of King Thestius and thus, brother of Althaea. He participated in the hunt for the Calydonian Boar but was angry that the prize of the boar's hide had been given to a woman (Atalanta) by his nephew Meleager, who then killed him in the ensuing argument.
- Toxeus, a Calydonian prince as the son of King Oeneus and Althaea (which makes him a nephew of the above Toxeus). He was the brother of Meleager, Clymenus, Periphas, Agelaus (or Ageleus), Thyreus (or Phereus or Pheres), Deianeira, Gorge, Eurymede and Melanippe. Toxeus was killed by his father for leaping over the trench which had been dug around Calydon. (This is paralleled by Remus overleaping that of Rōmulus. Cf. also the story of Poemander).
- Toxeus, an Oechalian prince as son of King Eurytus and Antiope or Antioche and brother of Clytius and Molion. All three were slain by Heracles. His other siblings were Iole, Deioneus, Didaeon and Iphitos.
