= Boeotus (son of Poseidon) =

Mythological son of Poseidon

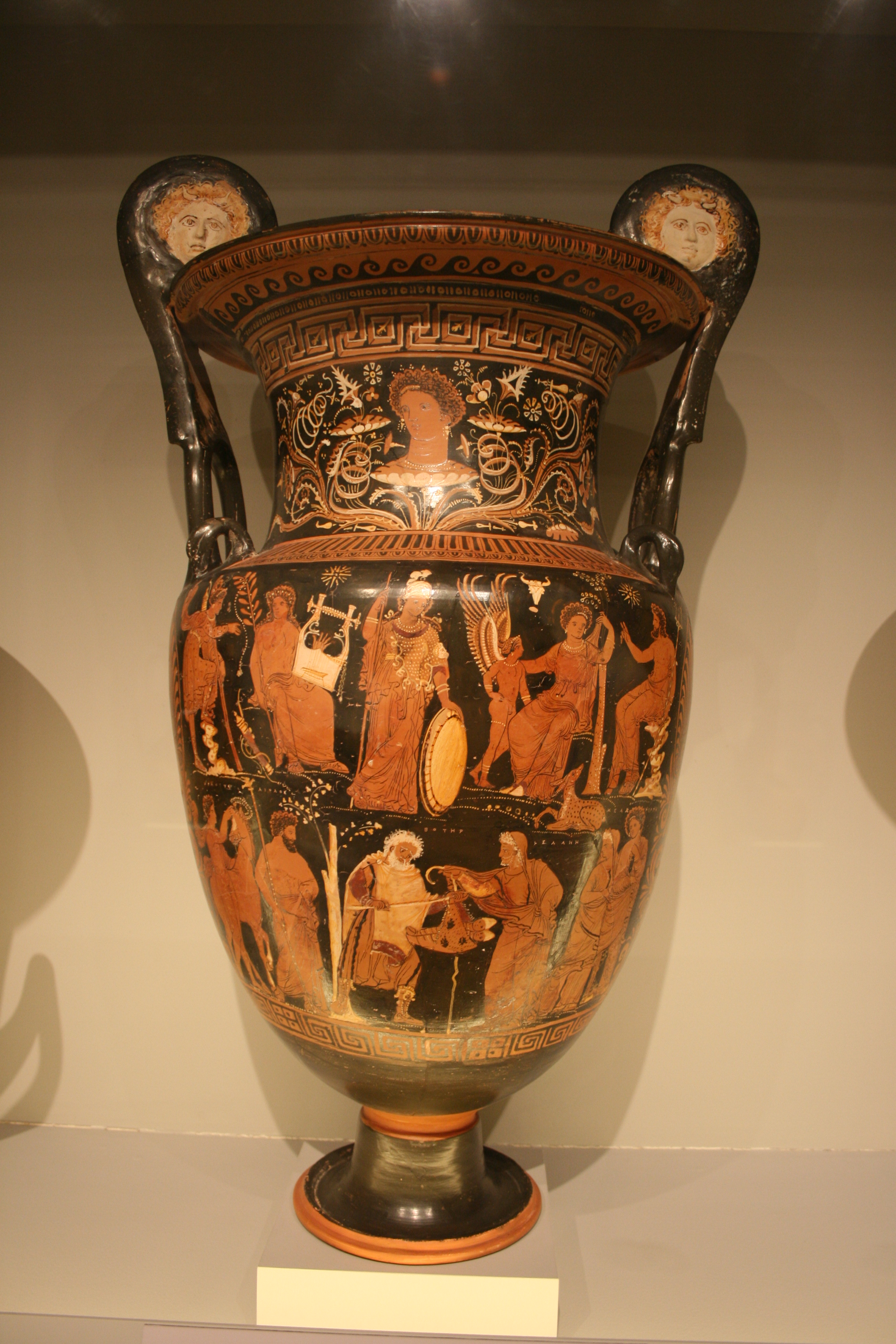
Boeotus and his twin Aeolus being presented as infants to Hellen by a shepherd on an Apulian red-figure volute krater, 4th-century BC.

In Greek mythology, Boeotus (Ancient Greek: Βοιωτός, romanized: Boiōtós, lit. 'man of Boeotia'; pronounced /biːˈoʊtəs/, bee-OH-tuhs or boy-oh-TOSS) was the eponym of Boeotia in Greece. Poseidon fathered both Aeolus and Boeotus with Arne (Melanippe). It was then through Boeotus that Arne became the ancestress of the Boeotians. In some traditions, Boeotus is the father of Ogyges.

== Mythology ==
A late source tells the story of Boeotus' marriage to Eurythemista. Boeotus was planning to get married and had difficulty choosing between two candidates, both equally noble maidens (one of them was Eurythemista and the other one's name is not given). He arranged to meet both on top of a nameless mountain; when they came, he saw a star fall on Eurythemista's shoulder and immediately vanish, and chose her. The mountain was named Asterion (from astēr, "star") to commemorate the event, but was later renamed Cithaeron in honor of the young Cithaeron who was loved by Tisiphone, one of the Erinyes, and killed by her for not answering her feelings, the same source relates.
