= Socus =

Various figures of Greek mythology

In Greek mythology, the name Socus (Ancient Greek: Σῶκος, romanized: Sôkos) may refer to the following personages:

- Socus of Euboea, father of the seven Corybantes/Dactyls (Prymneus, Mimas, Acmon, Damneus, Ocythous, Idaeus, Melisseus) by Combe. He expelled his wife and sons from the island, and was ultimately killed by Cecrops, in whose kingdom the Corybantes sought refuge. His name is also mentioned by Hesychius of Alexandria in the form Sochus (Σωχός).
- Socus, a defender of Troy, son of Hippasus and brother of Charops. The brothers were killed by Odysseus, though not before Socus wounded him.
- Socus, an epithet of Hermes of obscure etymology. According to a scholiast on the Homeric line where the epithet appears, there was an adjective σῶκος which meant "strong". The ancient authors linked the epithet to the Greek stem σω- < σαο- "whole, safe". Despite the attempts of modern scholars to elaborate on this etymological suggestion, no satisfactory explanation has been provided as of 1977.

== See also ==
- Naming citation for asteroid 3708 Socus
