= Aeolus (son of Poseidon) =

Figure in Greek mythology

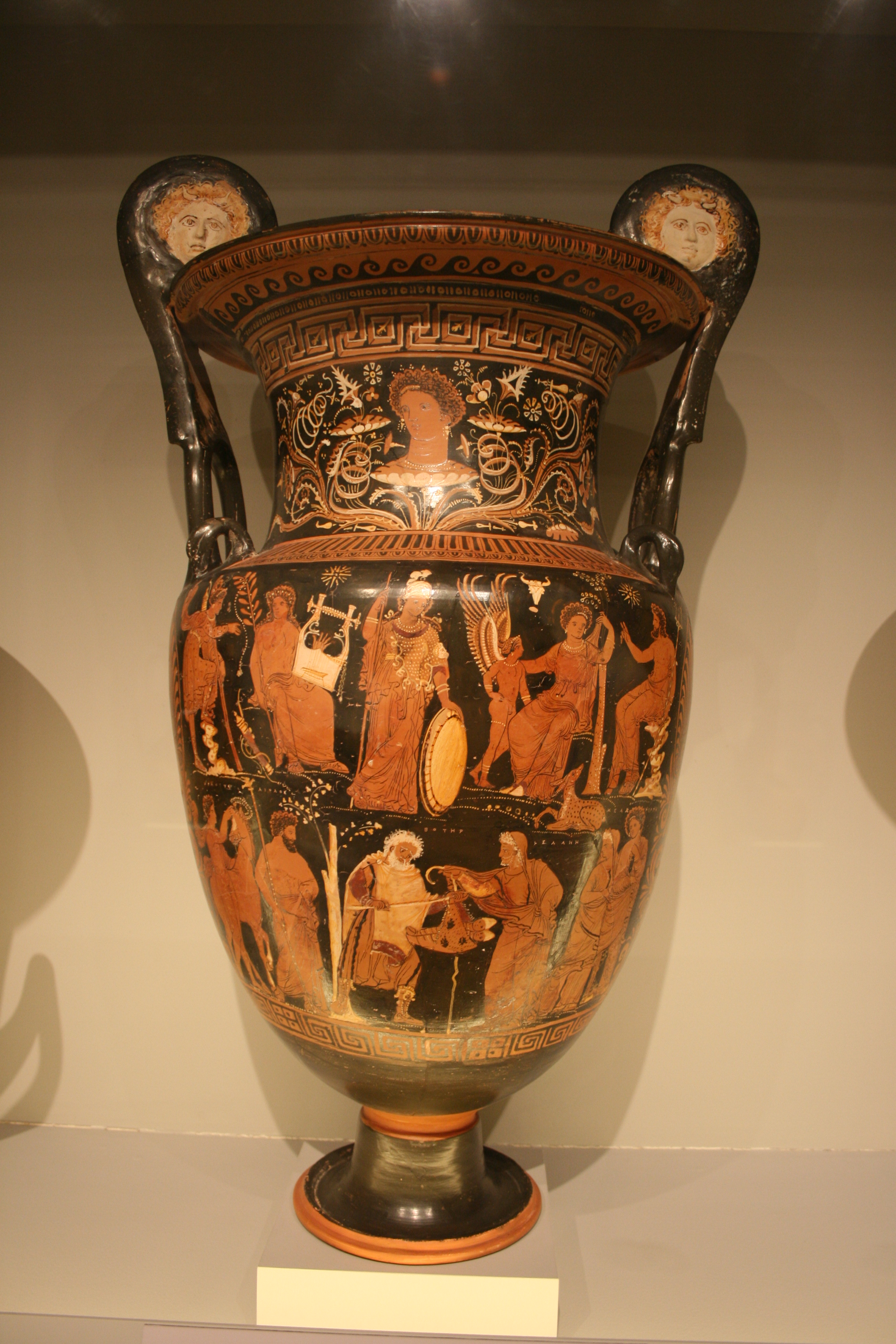
Infant twins Aeolus and Boeotus being presented to Hellen by a shepherd on an Apulian red-figure volute krater, 4th century BC.

In Greek mythology, Aeolus (/ˈiːələs/; Ancient Greek: Αἴολος, romanized: Aíolos [ǎi̯.olos]; Modern Greek: Αίολος [ˈe.olos]; lit. 'quick-moving, nimble') was a son of Poseidon by Arne, daughter of Aeolus (son of Hellen). He had a twin brother named Boeotus.

== Mythology ==
Arne confessed to her father that she was with child by the god Poseidon; her father, however, did not believe her, and handed her over to a man named Metapontus, King of Icaria. When Bœotus and Aeolus were born, they were raised by Metapontus; but their stepmother Autolyte or Theano (wife of Metapontus) quarreled with their mother Arne, prompting Bœotus and Aeolus to kill Autolyte and flee from Icaria. Bœotus, accompanied by Arne, went to southern Thessaly, and founded Boeotia; but Aeolus went to a group of islands in the Tyrrhenian Sea, which received from him the name of the Aeolian Islands. According to some accounts this Aeolus founded the town of Lipara. Although his home has been traditionally identified as one of the Aeolian Islands (there is little consensus as to which), near Sicily, an alternative location has been suggested at Gramvousa off the northwest coast of Crete.
