= Eurytus of Oechalia =

Greek mythological archer

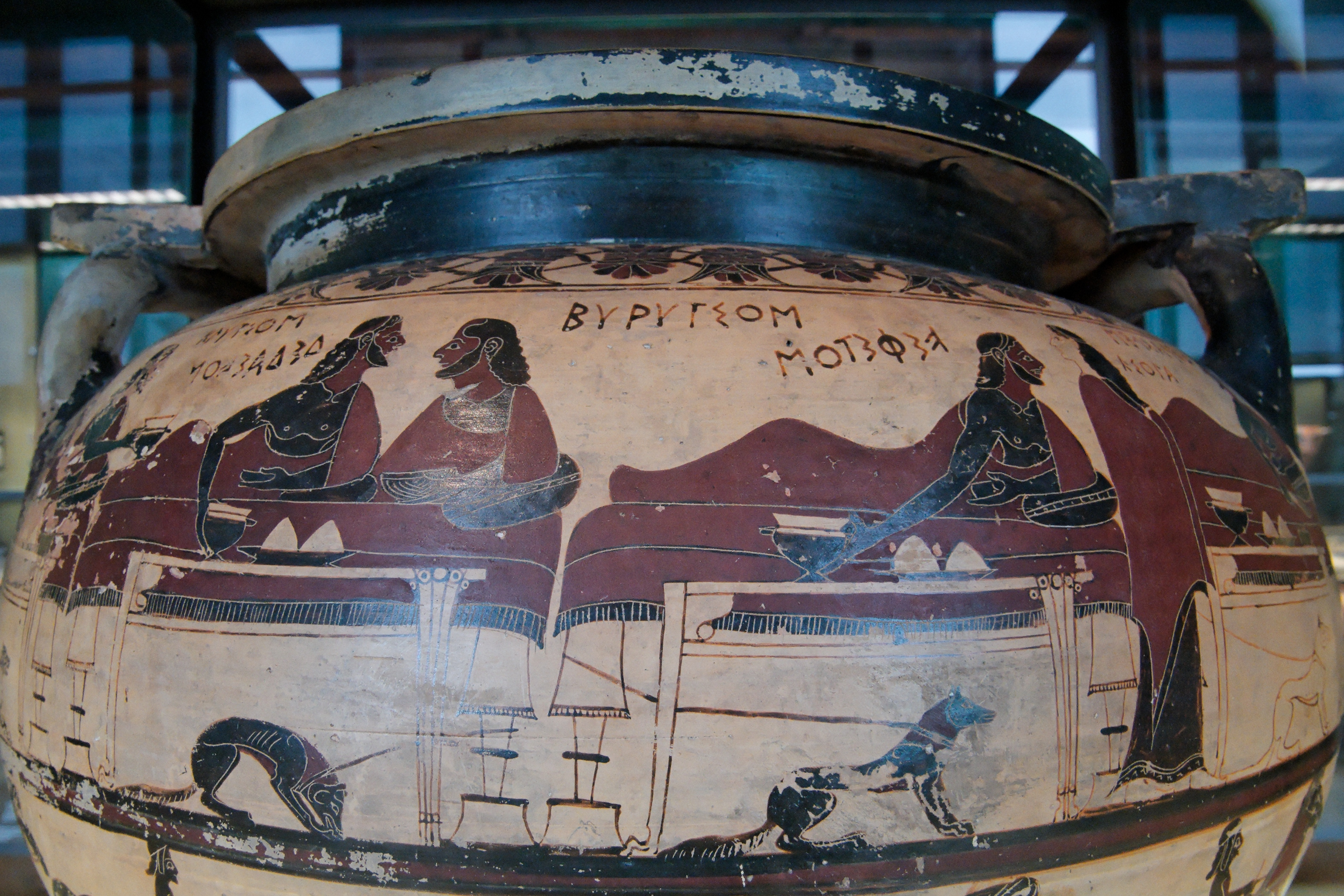
Image of King Eurytus of Oechalia in an Etruscan vase from Caere. Eurytus is depicted next to Heracles during a symposium. Krater of corinthian columns called Krater of Eurytus, circa 600 B.C.

Eurytus (/ˈjʊərɪtəs/; Ancient Greek: Εὔρυτος) of Oechalia (Οἰχαλίᾱ, Oikhalíā), Thessaly, was a skillful archer of Greek mythology who was even said to have instructed Heracles in the art of using the bow.

== Family ==
Eurytus was the son of Melaneus either by Stratonice, daughter of King Porthaon of Calydon and Laothoe, or by the eponymous heroine Oechalia. He was the brother of Ambracias, eponym of Ambracia, a city in Epirus. Eurytus's grandfather was Apollo, the archer-god.

Eurytus married Antiope, daughter of Pylon (son of Naubolus) and had these children: Iphitus, Clytius, Toxeus, Deioneus, Molion, Didaeon, Hippasus and a very beautiful daughter, Iole. A late legend also makes Eurytus the father of Dryope, by his first wife. Hesiod calls his wife Antioche and they had four sons but Creophylus says only two.

== Mythology ==
=== Contest with a god ===
According to Homer, Eurytus became so proud of his archery skills that he challenged Apollo. The god killed Eurytus for his presumption, and Eurytus's bow was passed to Iphitus, who later gave the bow to his friend Odysseus. It was this bow that Odysseus used to kill the suitors who had wanted to take his wife, Penelope.

=== Sacking of Oechalia ===
A more familiar version of Eurytus's death involves a feud with Heracles. Eurytus promised the hand of his daughter Iole as a prize to whoever could defeat him and his sons in an archery contest. Heracles won the archery contest, but Eurytus and his sons (except Iphitus) reneged on the promise and refused to give up Iole, fearing that Heracles would go mad and kill any children he had with Iole, just as he had slain the children whom he had had with Megara.

Heracles left in anger, and soon after twelve of Eurytus's mares were stolen. Some have written that Heracles stole the mares himself, while others have said that Autolycus stole the mares and sold them to Heracles. In the search for the mares, Iphitus, who was convinced of Heracles's innocence, invited Heracles to help and stayed as Heracles's guest at Tiryns. Heracles invited Iphitus to the top of the palace walls and, in a fit of anger, threw Iphitus to his death. For this crime, Heracles was forced to serve the Lydian queen Omphale as a slave for either one or three years.

After Heracles had married Deianeira, he returned to Oechalia with an army. Revenge-driven, Heracles sacked the city and killed Eurytus and his sons, then took Iole as his concubine. According to a tradition in Athenaeus, the hero put them to death because they had demanded a tribute from the Euboeans.

According to Pausanias, the remains of the body of Eurytus were believed to be preserved in the Carnasian grove; and in the Messenian Oechalia sacrifices were offered to him every year.
