= Ascalaphus (son of Ares) =

King of the Minyans in Greek mythology

In Greek mythology, Ascalaphus or Askalaphus (/əˈskæləfəs/; Ancient Greek: Ἀσκάλαφος Askalaphos), was son of Ares and the Minyan princess Astyoche, daughter of King Actor of Orchomenus. Ascalaphus was also a king of the Minyans, and twin brother of Ialmenos. These brothers were counted among the Argonauts and the suitors of Helen, and led the Orchomenian contingent in the Trojan War, where Deiphobos threw a spear and killed him.
