= Iphitos =

Name of several mythological Greek characters

Iphitos or Īphitus (/ˈɪfɪtəs/; Ancient Greek: Ἴφιτος, romanized: Íphitos) is the name of six individuals in Greek mythology.

- Iphitos, son of Eurytus, king of Oechalia. As Iole's brother, he was Heracles' brother-in-law and, according to one version of the myth, also his lover.
- Iphitos, son of Naubolus and king of Phocis, others say his father was the son of Hippasus from Peloponessus. He entertained Jason when he consulted the Delphic Oracle and later joined the Argonauts. Iphitus was an ally of the Thebans in the war of the Seven against Thebes. He was the leader of men from Phocis and the cities of Panope, Daulis, Cyparissos, Lebadia and Hyampolis during the war. By his wife Hippolyte or Thrasybule, Iphitos became the father of Schedius and Epistrophus who led the Phocians in the Trojan War.
- Iphitos, an Elean who was killed by Copreus, son of Pelops, who fled from Elis after the murder and later on was purified by King Eurystheus in Mycenae. According to the writer Alcman, Iphitos along with Lycurgus, belonged to the participants in the first Olympic Games.
- Iphitus, father of Eurynome, who was the mother of King Adrastus of Argos, one of the Seven against Thebes.
- Iphitos, an elderly Trojan during the Trojan War. In Book VIII of the Iliad, his son Archeptolemus suddenly becomes the charioteer of Hector when Eniopeus was killed by Diomedes. However, Teucer killed him in the same battle. In Aeneid Book II, Aeneas named Iphitos among half a dozen Trojan heroes who fight by his side during the fall of Troy. When the battle turned against them, Iphitos was the only one of these who remained standing. He was apparently by Aeneas's side until King Priam was killed. In some accounts, Iphitos was also the father of Coeranus who was killed by Odysseus.
- Iphitos, king of Elis, restored the Olympic Games after the Dorian invasion. The restoration came after he asked the Oracle at Delphi about what should be done to save Greece from civil war and the diseases that were killing the population. The Oracle answered: "Iphitos and the people of Elis must declare a sacred truce for the duration of the game and revive the Olympic Games".
