= Antiope (mythology) =

Name of several figures in Greek mythology

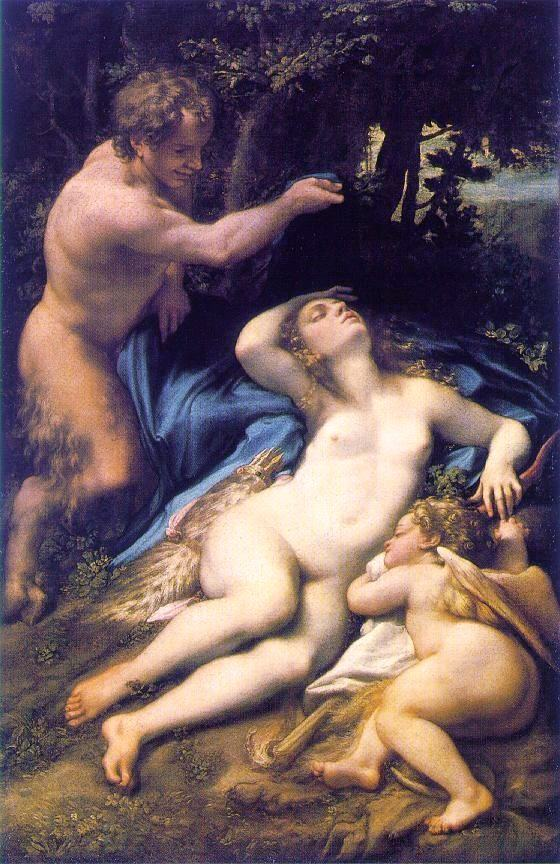

In Greek mythology, Antiope /ænˈtaɪ.əpi/ or Antiopa (Ancient Greek: Ἀντιόπη, romanized: Antiópē) may refer to the following

- Antiope, daughter of King Belus of Egypt and possibly, Achiroe, the naiad daughter of the river-god Nilus. She was the sister of Agenor II, Phineus, Aegyptus, Danaus, Cepheus and Ninus. By her uncle, King Agenor I of Tyre, Antiope became the mother of Cadmus and his siblings. In some accounts, this daughter of Belus was called Damno. Otherwise, the spouse of Agenor was variously given as Telephassa, Argiope or Tyro.
- Antiope, daughter of Aeolus, by whom Poseidon begot Boeotus and Hellen (Aeolus). She was also called Arne or Melanippe, in some accounts.
- Antiope, nymph of Pieria and the mother, by Pierus, of the Pierides, nine sisters who challenged the muses and, on their defeat, were turned into birds.
- Antiope, consort of Helios and possible mother of Aeetes and Aloeus.
- Antiope, sister of Hippolyte, kidnapped by Theseus during Heracles' ninth labour.
- Antiope, mother of Amphion by Zeus, associated with the mythology of Thebes, Greece.
- Antiope, also called Antioche, daughter of Pylon and wife of Eurytus.
- Antiope, a Thespian princess as one of the 50 daughters of King Thespius and Megamede or by one of his many wives. When Heracles hunted and ultimately slayed the Cithaeronian lion, Antiope with her other sisters, except for one, all laid with the hero in a night, a week or for 50 days as what their father strongly desired it to be. Antiope bore Heracles a son, Alopius.
- Antiope, wife of Laocoön.
