= Ialmenus =

Greek mythological hero, son of Ares

In Greek mythology, Ialmenus or Ialmenos (/aɪˈælmɪnəs/; Ancient Greek: Ἰάλμενος) was a son of Ares and Astyoche, and twin brother of Ascalaphus. Together with his brother he sailed with the Argonauts, among the suitors of Helen, and led the Orchomenian contingent in the Trojan War.

Unlike Ascalaphus, Ialmenus survived the war. He was said to have ended up in Colchis, where he founded a colony, the inhabitants of which were later referred to as the "Achaeans of Pontus".

== See also ==
- 21602 Ialmenus, Jovian asteroid
