= Iole =

Mythical daughter of King Eurytus of Oechalia

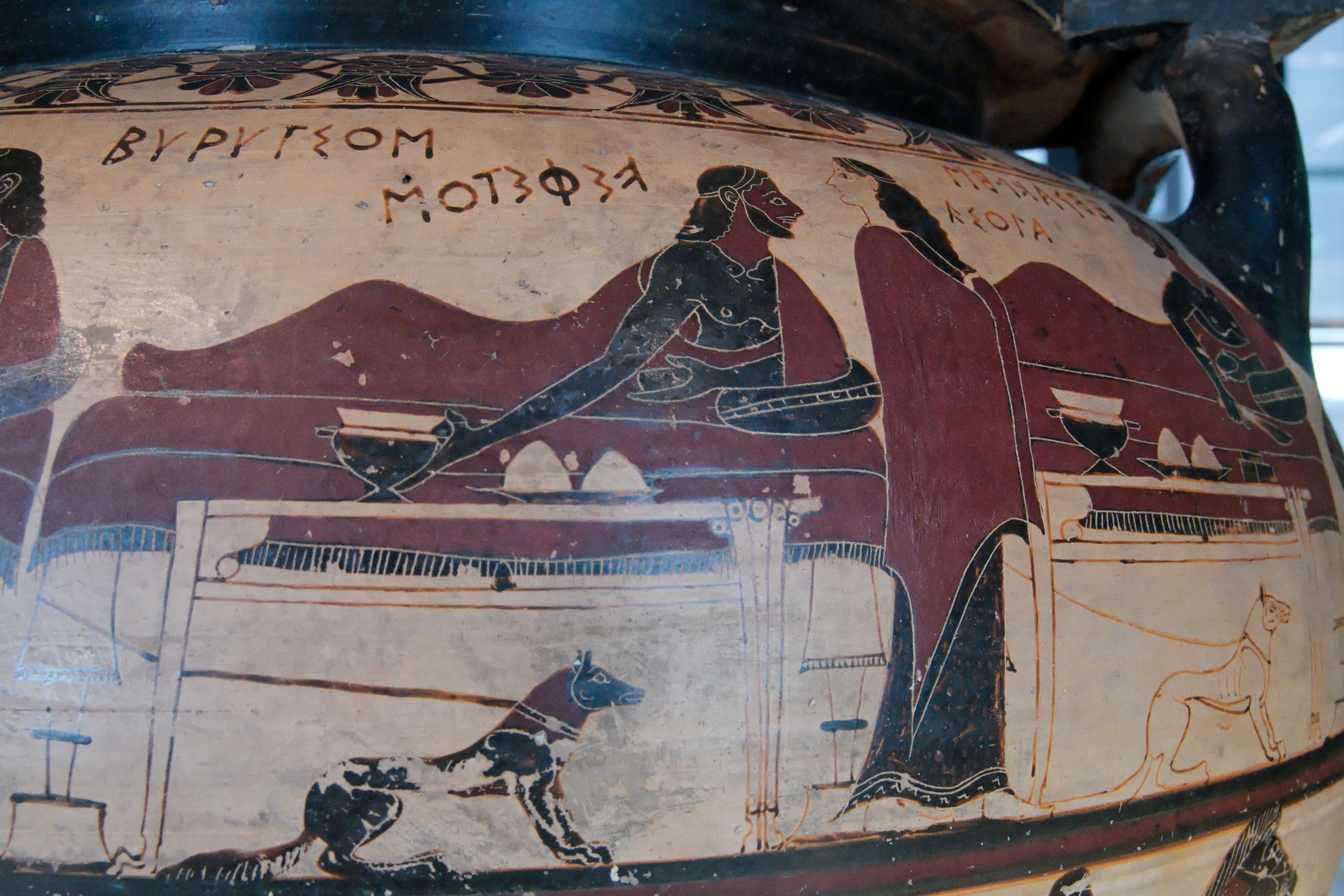
Iole with Heracles in the house of Eurytus, as depicted on the seventh-century Eurytos column-crater, Louvre. Iole's name is given in its Corinthian (Doric) form Ϝιόλᾱ ("Viola"), with digamma and a local Σ-shaped form for iota. It is located under the name of Heracles in the right upper corner of the image.

In Greek mythology, Iole (/ˈaɪ.əli/; Ancient Greek: Ἰόλη [iólɛː]) was the daughter of King Eurytus of Oechalia. According to the brief epitome in the Bibliotheca, Eurytus had a beautiful young daughter named Iole who was eligible for marriage. Iole was claimed by Heracles for a bride, but Eurytus refused her hand in marriage. Iole was indirectly the cause of Heracles' death because of his wife's jealousy of her.

There are different versions of the mythology of Iole from many ancient sources. The Bibliotheca gives the most complete story followed by slight variations of this from Seneca and Ovid. Other ancient sources (i.e. Diodorus Siculus, Gaius Julius Hyginus, and Pseudo-Plutarch) have similar information on Iole with additional variations.

== Mythology ==
=== Heracles' love for Iole leads to his death ===
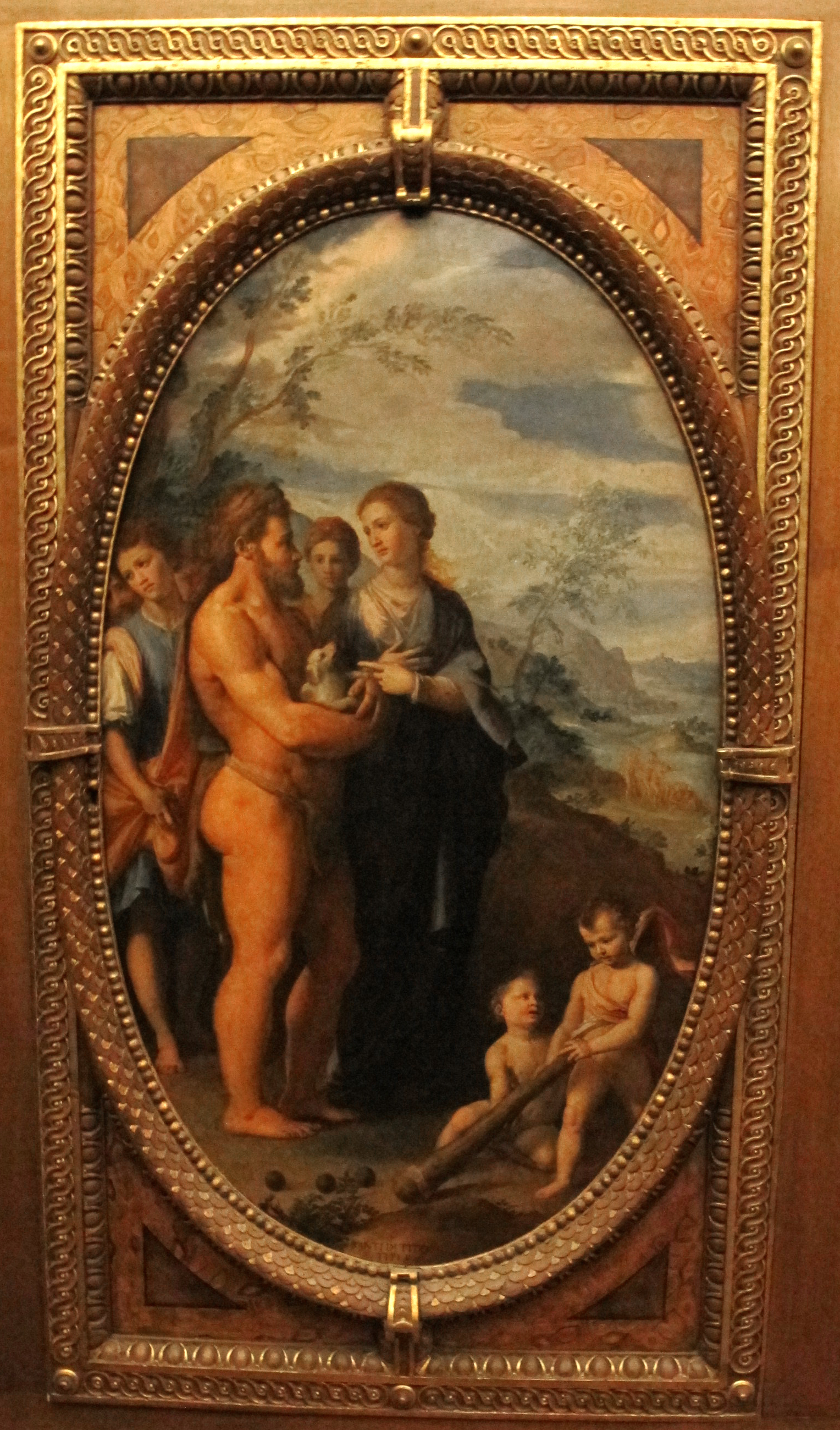
Santi di Tito: Iole and Hercules

Apollodorus recounted the tale in his Bibliotheca. King Eurytus was an expert archer who taught his sons his knowledge of the bow and arrow. He promised his daughter Iole to whoever could beat him and his sons in an archery contest. The sons shot so well that they beat all the others from the kingdom. Heracles then heard of the prize and eagerly entered the contest, for he desired the maiden. Heracles shot with keenness and even beat Eurytus' scores. It is ironic because Eurytus, in his early years, had taught Heracles to become an archer.

When the king realized that Heracles was winning, he stopped the contest and forbade him to participate. Eurytus was well-aware of Heracles' murder of his previous wife Megara and their children, and was thus afraid that Iole and her offspring by him would suffer the same fate. Eventually, Heracles had won the contest but was not entitled to the prize because of his reputation. Eurytus broke his promise to give his royal daughter to the winner of the archery contest.

Iphitos urged his father to reconsider, but Eurytus did not pay any heed and stood by his decision. Heracles had not left the city yet when Eurytus' mares were run off, presumably by Autolycus, a notorious thief. Iphitos asked Heracles to help him find them, which he agreed to do so. Heracles, in one display of his madness, hurled Iphitos over the city walls, murdering him. According to Diodorus Siculus, it was Heracles himself who drove off the mares of Eurytus in revenge. The hero had failed in his courtship to win Iole.

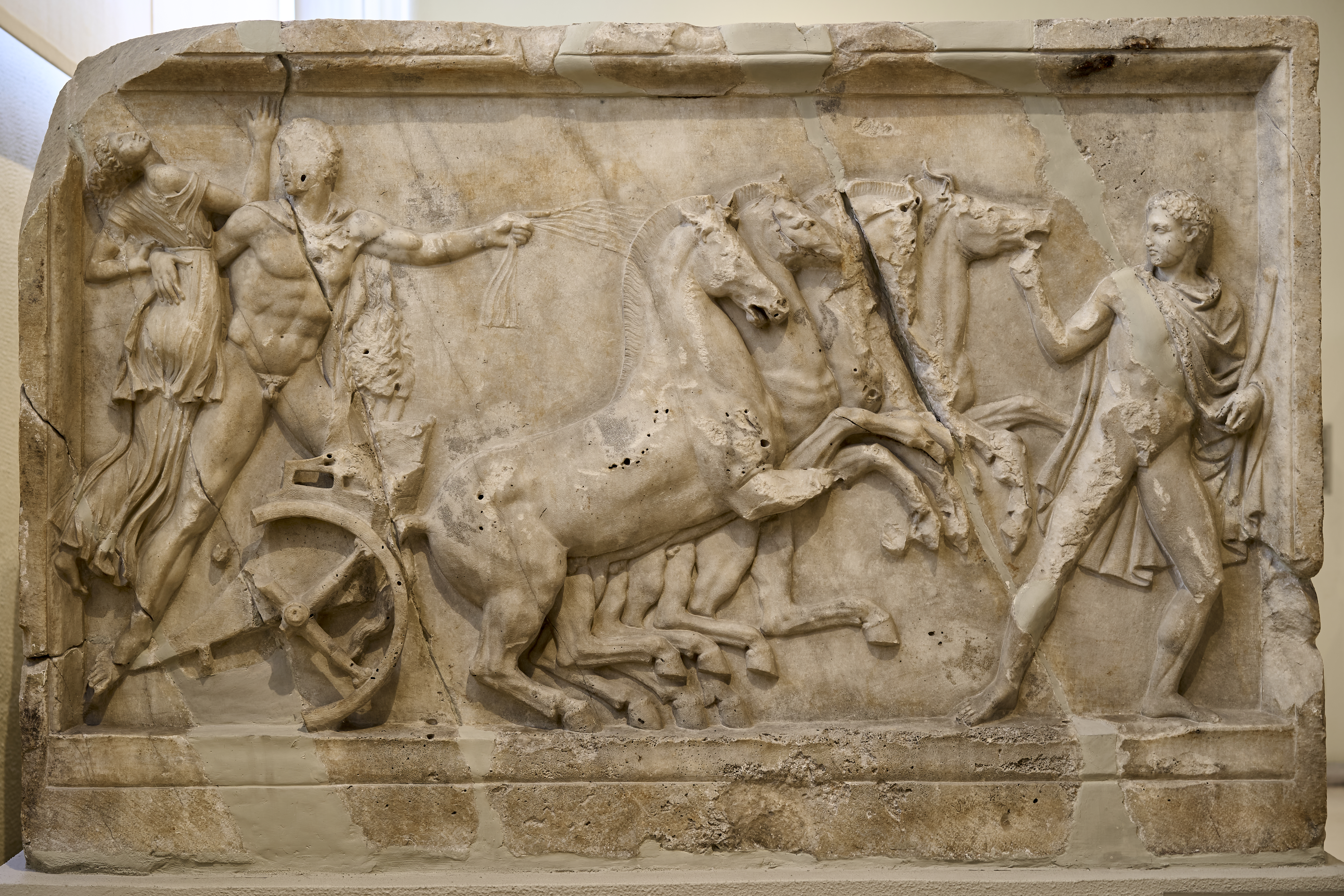
Heracles abducts Iole, second century AD relief, Archaeological Museum of Piraeus.

After the archery contest, Heracles went to Calydon, where, on the steps of the temple, he saw Deianira, Prince Meleager's sister. He forgot about Iole for a while and wooed her, eventually won her over and married her. Heracles, after acquiring a kingdom and in control of an army, went about to kill Eurytus in revenge for not giving up his promised prize. Hyginus added that Heracles not only murdered Eurytus, but also slew Iole's brothers and other relatives as well.

The hero plundered Oechalia and overthrew its walls, while Iole threw herself down from the high city wall to escape. It turned out that the garment she was wearing opened up and acted like a parachute, which ensured her soft and safe descent. Heracles took Iole as a captive. His wife, Deianira, did not want Iole to become Heracles' concubine but she forbore to object and tolerated it temporarily.

Deianira feared she would lose Heracles to the younger and more beautiful Iole. Years earlier, the centaur Nessus had ferried her across the river Evenus and attempted to rape her when they were on the other side. Heracles saved her from Nessus by shooting him with poisoned arrows. She had kept some of Nessus' blood, for the centaur told her, with his dying breath, that if she were to give Heracles a cloak (chiton) soaked in his blood, it would be a love charm. Deianira, concerned by Heracles' infidelity, believed Nessus' lie that Heracles would no longer desire any other woman after he was under the spell of the love philter. This seemed like the solution to her problem of reclaiming her husband's love from Iole, the foreign concubine. The cloak was delivered to Heracles and, when he put it on, the poison went into his body. Deianira had unwittingly poisoned her husband with this purported love potion. Upon realizing the mistake she had made, Deianira killed herself. Because of his love for Iole, Heracles asked his eldest son Hyllus to marry her so that she would be well taken care of. Iole and Hyllus had a son called Cleodaeus, and also three daughters, Evaechme, Aristaechme, and Hyllis.

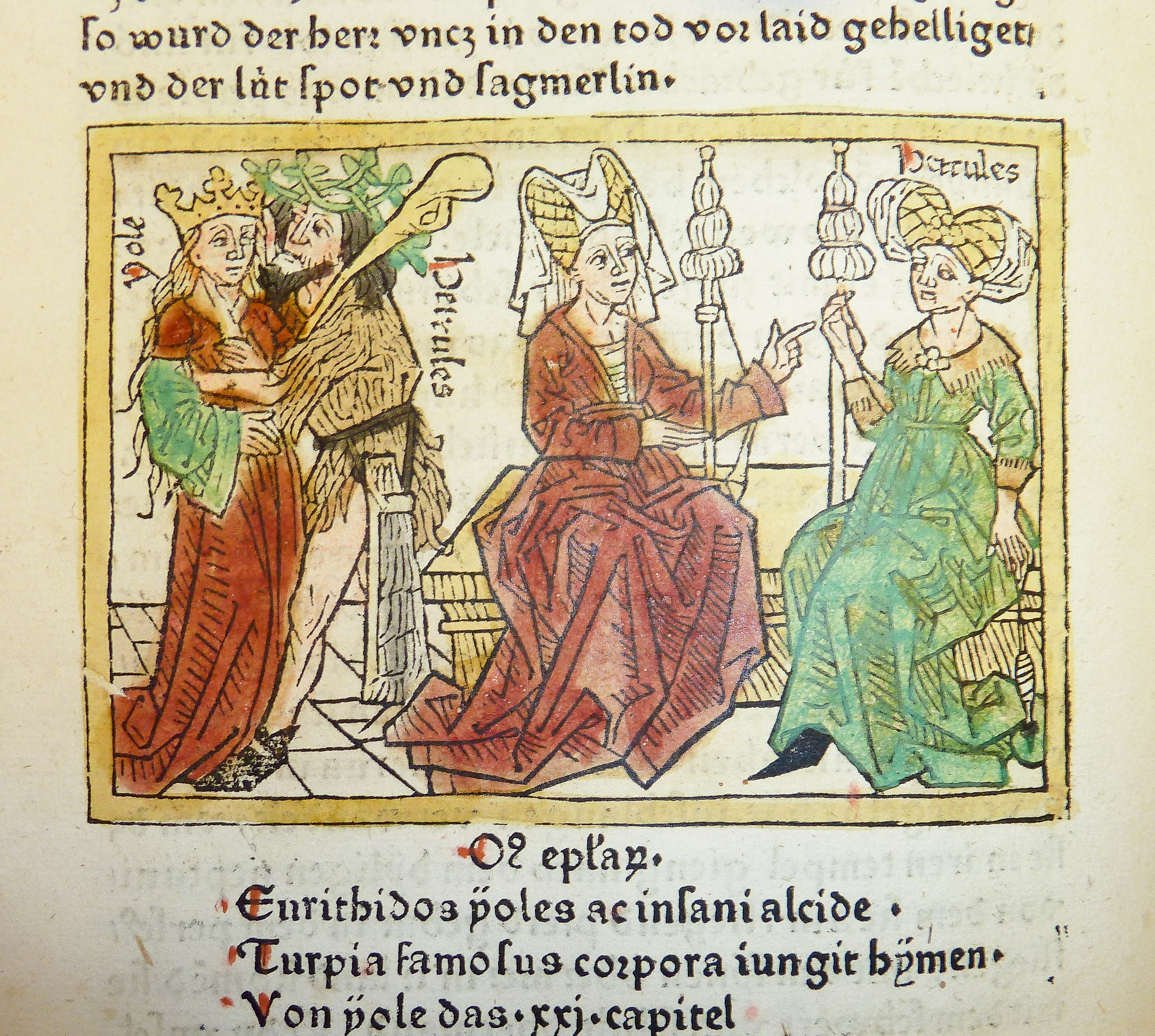
Woodcut illustration of Hercules (dressed as both a man and a woman) and Iole

=== Versions of the tale ===
==== Ovid's account ====
Ovid's version of this story (Heroides 9) has Heracles under the erotic control of Iole. She specifically has Heracles wear women's clothing and perform women's work. Heracles, all the while, is bragging about his heroic deeds. However, Deianira reminds him how he is dressed in feminine attire and Iole is wearing his clothing while carrying his club. Deianira ultimately urges silence from him. The same version shows the disgrace and shame of Heracles, who was once a strong warrior fighter, outwitted by Iole in being made to do effeminate acts. In this skillful crafty manner, she had avenged her father's death.

==== Sophocles' account ====
According to Sophocles' play Women of Trachis, Iole's mother was Antiope and her siblings were Iphitos, Clytius, Toxeus, Deioneus, Molion, and Didaeon. In the play, Iole is described as the daughter of King Eurytus, the royal princess of Oechalia. She is among the captive maidens of Oechalia when Heracles ransacks the city. She is to become the concubine of Heracles. Toward the end of the play, Heracles asks his son Hyllus to marry her when he dies, so she will be well taken care of. Hyllus agrees to do this for his father.

==== Seneca's account ====
According to Seneca, Deianira is concerned that the captive Iole, who Heracles took as his concubine, will give brothers to her sons. She fears that Iole will become a daughter-in-law of Jove. He explains how Deianira thinks of the possible children of Heracles by Iole and her chance for vengeance on them. He shows the same jealousy Deianira has of Iole as does Apollodorus.

== Appearances in popular culture ==
Iole appeared in cinema as early as the 1958 film Hercules. She was portrayed by model/actress Sylva Koscina. She is the daughter of King Pelias of Iolcus and cousin of Jason. She first meets Hercules after he saves her from a wild chariot ride and returns her safely home. She vouches for Hercules' identity as the man hired by her father to train her brother Iphitus in the art of war. While he remains in the kingdom, Iole quickly falls in love with Hercules but their romance sours over the death of Iphitis during Hercules' battle with a lion. Despite her outward rejection of Hercules, she continues to love him and waits for his return once he joins Jason's quest for the Golden Fleece. It is eventually revealed Iole's father plotted the murder of his brother Aeson so he could inherit the rule of Iolcus. Once Hercules and Jason return and confront Pelias with the truth, Pelias' army is defeated and he commits suicide. After Jason assumes the throne as King of Iolcus, Iole leaves with Hercules aboard the Argo to begin a new life together. Koscina reprised the role the following year in Hercules Unchained. In the sequel, Iole is happily married to Hercules and they return to Hercules' homeland of Thebes to start their married life. Iole, however, becomes a prisoner of Thebes' deranged king Eteocles in his attempt to punish Hercules for allegedly siding with Eteocles' brother Polinices in their civil war for the throne of Thebes. Aided in her attempt to escape Thebes, Iole is then captured by Polinices' mercenary army of Argives. After the final battle between Thebes and the Argives, she is rescued by Hercules.

Iole appears in the 1963 film Hercules, Samson and Ulysses. The film is a sequel to the 1959 film Hercules Unchained; however, the role of Iole is portrayed by Diletta D'Andrea, replacing Sylva Koscina. She is still married to Hercules and is mother to a little boy who she raises in the house of King Laertes of Ithaca. She shows grave concern for Hercules' newest mission to destroy a sea monster menacing the fishing waters off the coast of the kingdom. When news is returned home that Hercules and his crew have been shipwrecked, she urges King Laertes to muster a rescue party. She joins the voyage aboard the Argo and reunites with Hercules off the coast of Judea where the couple bid farewell to Hercules' newest ally Samson and sail home.

Iole appears in Hercules in the Underworld, played by Marley Shelton. She is a Neurian Maiden, one trained in the art of seduction. She recruits Hercules to help her village because a portal to the underworld has opened up. Though she already has a boyfriend named Lycastus, in an effort to persuade Hercules to help, she attempts to seduce him and manages to kiss him, but he remains faithful to his wife Deianeira and says he'll help her village because it is the right thing to do. Similar to the original myth, Deianeira becomes suspicious of the two spending time together as they travel to her village and sends Hercules a cloak smeared with Nessus's blood, thinking it will keep Hercules faithful to her. Instead, the cloak tries to strangle him when he puts it on, but he manages to destroy it. After Hercules manages to solve the portal problem, Iole decides to start a family with Lycastus.

Iole appears as a little girl in 2005's mini-series Hercules; she is the daughter of Eurystheus and Megara. In an attempt to bring peace between the two branches of the family, Hercules asks for his son Hyllas to be betrothed to Iole should he fulfill one of his Labours: capturing/shooting the Cerynian Hind; he's successful, but Eurystheus refuses, having been foretold that Iole's husband would eventually kill him. This is later proved true when Hyllas throws a knife at the king.

Iole was a pseudonym adopted by Letitia Elizabeth Landon over a period from 1825 to 1826.

=== Middle Age tradition ===
She is remembered in De Mulieribus Claris, a collection of biographies of historical and mythological women by the Florentine author Giovanni Boccaccio, composed in 1361–62. It is notable as the first collection devoted exclusively to biographies of women in Western literature.

== See also ==
- 836 Jole - an asteroid named after her.
