= Eurymede =

Several women in Greek mythology

In Greek mythology, Eurymēdē (Ancient Greek: Εὐρυμήδη or Εὐρυμέδη, romanized: Eurumēdē, lit. 'lady with wide-ranging thoughts'") may refer to the following characters:

- Eurymēdē, mother by Glaucus of Bellerophon and possibly Deliades (Alcimenes or Piren). Otherwise, she was called Eurynome.
- Eurymēdē, a Aetolian princess as daughter of King Oeneus of Calydon and Althaea, daughter of King Thestius of Pleuron. She was one of the sisters of Meleager that are called Meleagrides and who, grieving much the death of their brother, were turned into birds by Artemis. Eurymede's other siblings were Deianeira, Toxeus, Clymenus, Periphas, Agelaus (or Ageleus), Thyreus (or Phereus or Pheres), Gorge and Melanippe.
