= Pheres (mythology) =

In Greek mythology, Pheres (Ancient Greek: Φέρης, romanized: Phéres or Phérēs, lit. 'bringer', 'bearer' or 'carrier') may refer to the following individuals:

- Pheres, son of Cretheus and Tyro.
- Pheres, son of King Ormenus, a descendant of Zeus. He was the father of Amyntor, father of Astydameia who bore Tlepolemus to Heracles.
- Pheres, also known as Phereus or Thyreus, a Calydonian prince as the son of King Oeneus and Althaea, daughter of King Thestius of Pleuron. He was the brother of Deianeira, Meleager, Toxeus, Clymenus, Periphas, Agelaus and Gorge. When the war between the Curetes and the Calydonians broke out, Pheres along with his brothers, including Meleager, all fell during the battle.
- Pheres, son of Jason and Medea.
- Pheres, a Cretan killed by Aeneas in the Trojan War.
- Pheres, a companion of Aeneas in Italy. During the battle between the latter and Turnus, Pheres was killed by Halaesus.
- Pheres, a defender of Thebes
