= Meleagrids =

Mythical sisters turned into birds in Greek mythology

In Greek mythology, the Meleagrids (Ancient Greek: Μελεαγρίδες) are the sisters of the hero Meleager, and daughters of Althaea and Oeneus.

== Mythology ==
When their brother died, the Meleagrides cried incessantly until Artemis changed them into guineafowl and transferred them to the island of Leros. According to an alternate version cited in the dictionary of Suda, the Meleagrids were companions of Iocallis, a maiden of Leros who was honored as a deity. Guinea fowl were kept in the shrine of The Maiden (likely Artemis) on Leros, and the inhabitants of the island, as well as other worshippers of Artemis, abstained from eating the bird.

The Meleagrids that were transformed are Melanippe and Eurymede, or alternatively Polyxo and Autonoë (albeit no transformation is mentioned for them). Mothone and Perimede are also named as daughters of Oeneus, but without mention of siblings, and possibly they were not fathered by the same Oeneus. Beside the two couples, two more daughters are mentioned by the same sources, Gorge and Deianeira. They were not transformed, since the former was married off to Andraemon, and the latter to Heracles.
