= Eurynome (daughter of Nisus) =

Daughter of Nisos in Greek mythology

In Greek mythology, Eurynome (/jʊəˈrɪnəmi/; Ancient Greek: Εὐρυνόμη, from εὐρύς, eurys, "broad" and νομός, nomos, "pasture" or νόμος "law") or Eurymede was a Megarian princess who became a queen of Corinth.

== Family ==
Eurynome was the daughter of King Nisus of Megara and possibly, Abrota of Onchestus, thus sister to Scylla and Iphinoe. She became the mother of the hero Bellerophon by Poseidon even if she was wed to the Corinthian king Glaucus. By the latter, Eurynome probably bore Deliades (Alcimenes or Piren) who was killed by his own brother Bellerophon.

== Mythology ==
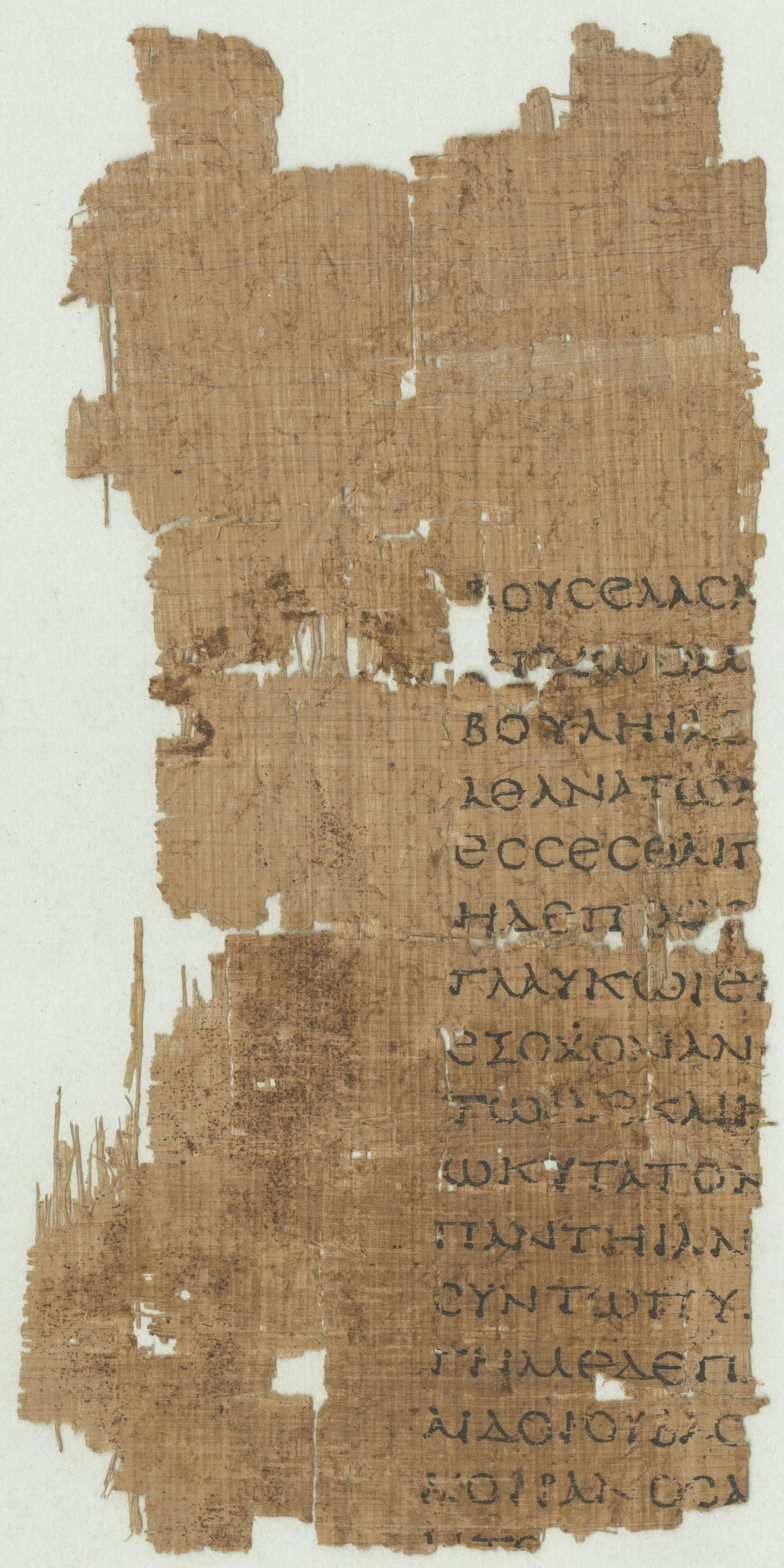
2nd-century CE papyrus fragment of Hesiod concerning Eurynome, Mestra and Bellerophon.

According to the Hesiodic Catalogue of Women, Athena herself taught the girl handiwork. Sisyphus attempted to drive away her cattle, but ended up winning her as bride for his son Glaucus by the will of Athena. But Zeus had ordained that Sisyphus would not leave behind any progeny, and Eurynome lay instead with Poseidon, giving birth to Bellerophon.

=== Hesiod's account ===
Eurynome the daughter of Nisus, Pandion's son, to whom Pallas Athene taught all her art, both wit and wisdom too; for she was as wise as the gods. A marvellous scent rose from her silver raiment as she moved, and beauty was wafted from her eyes. Her, then, Glaucus sought to win by Athena's advising, and he drove oxen for her. But he knew not at all the intent of Zeus who holds the aegis. So Glaucus came seeking her to wife with gifts; but cloud-driving Zeus, king of the deathless gods, bent his head in oath that the . . . son of Sisyphus should never have children born of one father. So she lay in the arms of Poseidon and bare in the house of Glaucus blameless Bellerophon, surpassing all men in . . . over the boundless sea.

== General and cited references ==
- Apollodorus, The Library with an English Translation by Sir James George Frazer, F.B.A., F.R.S. in 2 Volumes, Cambridge, MA, Harvard University Press; London, William Heinemann Ltd. 1921. ISBN 0-674-99135-4. Online version at the Perseus Digital Library. Greek text available from the same website.
- Gaius Julius Hyginus, Fabulae from The Myths of Hyginus translated and edited by Mary Grant. University of Kansas Publications in Humanistic Studies. Online version at the Topos Text Project.
- Hesiod, Catalogue of Women from Homeric Hymns, Epic Cycle, Homerica translated by Evelyn-White, H G. Loeb Classical Library Volume 57. London: William Heinemann, 1914. Online version at theio.com
- Lucius Mestrius Plutarchus, Moralia with an English Translation by Frank Cole Babbitt. Cambridge, MA. Harvard University Press. London. William Heinemann Ltd. 1936. Online version at the Perseus Digital Library. Greek text available from the same website.
- Pausanias, Description of Greece with an English translation by W.H.S. Jones, Litt.D., and H.A. Ormerod, M.A., in four volumes. Cambridge, MA, Harvard University Press; London, William Heinemann Ltd. 1918. ISBN 0-674-99328-4. Online version at the Perseus Digital Library
- Pausanias, Graeciae Descriptio. Three vols. Leipzig, Teubner. 1903. Greek text available at the Perseus Digital Library.
