= Alcimenes =

Alcimenes (/ælˈsɪməniːz/, Ancient Greek: Ἀλκιμένης) can refer to a number of people in Greek mythology and history:

Mythology

- Alcimenes, a Boeotian prince as the son of King Glaucus of Potniae and possibly, Eurymede or Eurynome, daughter of King Nisus of Megara. He was unintentionally killed by his own brother Bellerophon. According to some traditions, he was called Deliades or Peiren.
- Alcimedes, one of the sons of Jason and Medea. When Jason subsequently wanted to marry Glauce, his sons Alcimenes and Tisander were murdered by Medea, and were afterwards buried by Jason in the sanctuary of Hera at Corinth.

History

- Alcimenes, an Athenian comic poet, apparently a contemporary of Aeschylus. One of his pieces is supposed to have been titled "The Female Swimmers" (Κολυμβῶσαι). His works were greatly admired by Tynnichus, a younger contemporary of Aeschylus.
- Alcimenes, a tragic writer who was a native of Megara, mentioned in the Suda.
