= Piren =

In Greek mythology, Piren (Ancient Greek: Πειρῆνα, lit. 'fasten by the ends') or Peiren (Πειρῆνος) may refer to the following personages:

- Piren, a king of Argos and father of Io.
- Piren, a Boeotian prince as the son of King Glaucus of Potniae and possibly, Eurymede or Eurynome, daughter of King Nisus of Megara. He was unintentionally killed by his own brother Bellerophon. According to some traditions, he was called Alcimenes or Deliades (Heliades).
