= Meleager =

Ancient Greek mythical character

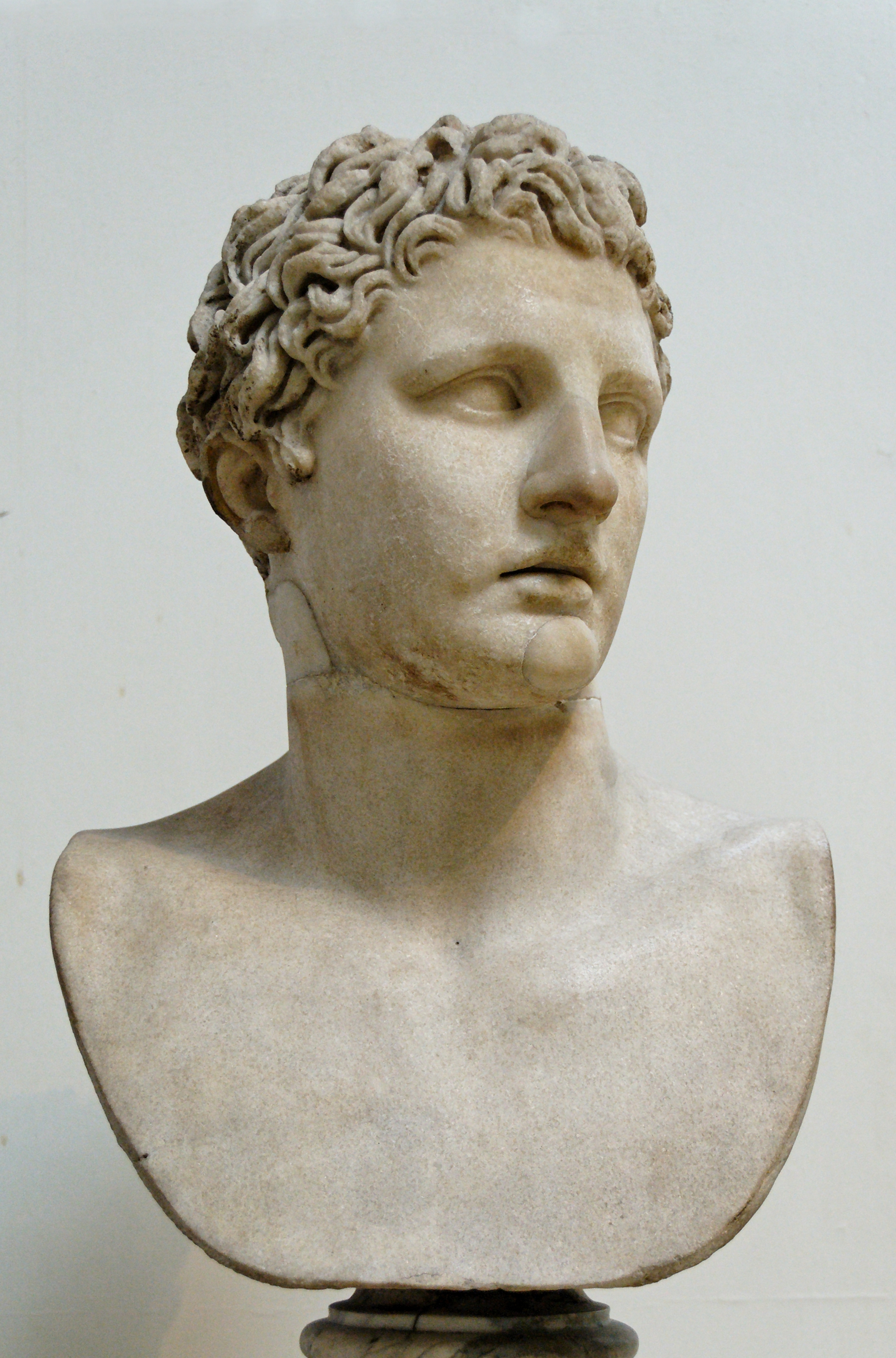
Bust of Meleager, Roman copy after a Greek original of c. 340-330 BC

Meleager (/ˌmɛliˈeɪɡər/; Ancient Greek: Μελέαγρος, romanized: Meléagros) was a hero in Greek mythology, venerated in his temenos at Calydon in Aetolia. He was famed as the host of the Calydonian boar hunt in the epic tradition that was reworked by Homer, and was also mentioned as one of the Argonauts.

== Mythology ==
Meleager was a Calydonian prince as the son of Althaea and the vintner King Oeneus or according to some, of the god Ares. He was the brother of Deianeira, Toxeus, Clymenus, Periphas, Agelaus (or Ageleus), Thyreus (or Phereus or Pheres), Gorge, Eurymede and Melanippe.

Meleager was the father of Parthenopeus by Atalanta but he married Cleopatra, daughter of Idas and Marpessa. They had a daughter, Polydora, who became the bride of Protesilaus, who left her bed on their wedding-night to join the expedition to Troy.

=== Calydonian boar hunt ===
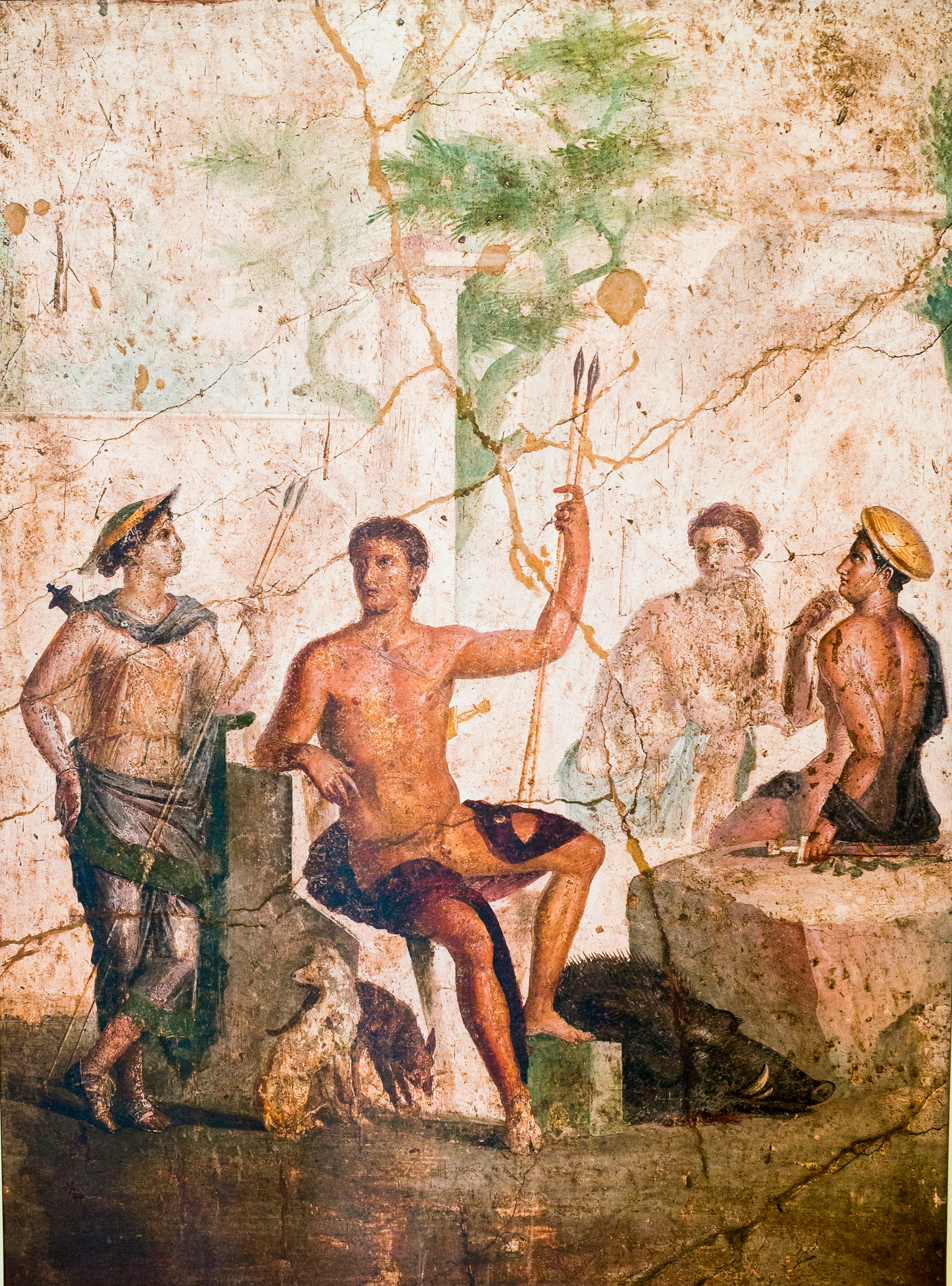
Meleager (sitting on a rock, with 2 spears) and Atalanta (standing) reposing after the Calydonian boar-hunt. Antique fresco from Pompeii.

When Meleager was born, the Moirai (the Fates) predicted he would only live until a piece of wood, then burning in the family hearth, was consumed by fire. Overhearing them, Althaea immediately doused and hid it.

Oeneus sent Meleager to gather up heroes from all over Greece to hunt the Calydonian boar that had been terrorizing the area and rooting up the vines, as Oeneus had omitted Artemis at a festival in which he honored the other gods. In addition to the heroes he required, he chose Atalanta, a fierce huntress, whom he loved. According to one account of the hunt, when Hylaeus and Rhoecus, two centaurs, tried to rape Atalanta, Meleager killed them. Then Atalanta wounded the boar and Meleager killed it. He awarded her the hide since she had drawn the first drop of blood.

Meleager's uncles Toxeus, the "archer", and Plexippus grew enraged that the prize was given to a woman. Meleager killed them in the following argument. He also killed Iphicles and Eurypylus for insulting Atalanta. When Althaea found out that Meleager had killed her brothers, she placed the piece of wood that she was given by the Fates (the one that the Fates foretold that, once engulfed with fire, would kill Meleager) upon the fire, thus fulfilling the prophecy and killing Meleager, her own son. Meleager's sisters who mourned his death excessively were turned into guineafowl (meleagrides).

=== Afterlife ===
In the underworld, he was the only shade that did not flee Heracles, who had come after Cerberus. In Bacchylides' Ode V, Meleager is depicted as still in his shining armor, so formidable, in Bacchylides' account, that Heracles reached for his bow to defend himself. Heracles was moved to tears by Meleager's account; Meleager had left his sister Deianira unwedded in his father's house, and entreated Heracles to take her as his bride; here Bacchylides breaks off his account of the meeting, without noting that in this way Heracles in the underworld chooses a disastrous wife.

According to Pliny the Elder's Natural History, Book 37, Chapter 11, Sophocles believed that amber is produced in the countries beyond India, from the tears that are shed for Meleager, by the birds called "meleagrides".

== Influences ==
The Greek name for the Guineafowl, Meleagris, is named after him.

Among the Romans, the heroes assembled by Meleager for the Calydonian hunt provided a theme of multiple nudes in striking action, to be portrayed frieze-like on sarcophagi.

Meleager's story has similarities with the Scandinavian Norna-Gests þáttr.

== Family tree ==
Calydonian dynasty

Dorus	Aetolus	Pronoe	Amythaon
Xanthippe	Pleuron	Calydon	Aeolia
Sterope	Stratonice	Laophonte	Agenor	Epicaste	Cleoboea	Protogeneia	Ares
Euryte	Porthaon	Demonice	Thestius	Eurythemis	Oxylus
Oeneus	Althaea	Toxeus	Evippus	Plexippus	Eurypylus	Leda
Periphas	Toxeus	Deianira	Gorge	Perimede	Phoenix	Oecles	Hypermnestra
Clymenus	Melanippe	Thoas	Astypalaea	Poseidon	Polyboea	Iphianeira	Amphiaraus
Methone	Agelaus	Ancaeus	Eurypylus	Clytie
Thyreus	Eurymede	Heracles	Chalciope
Meleager	Thessalus

== Gallery ==
Meleager in art

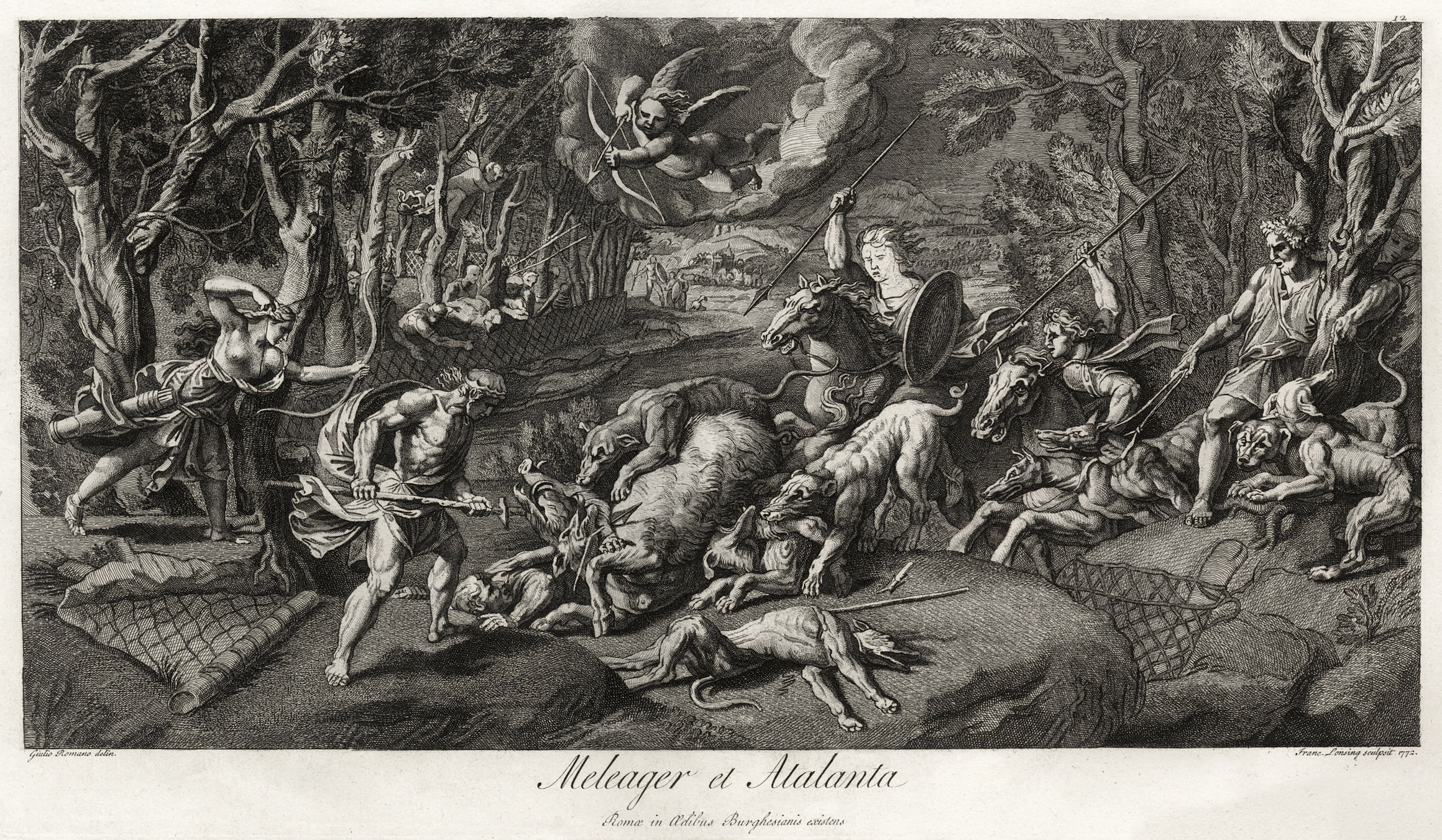
Meleager et Atalanta, after Giulio Romano

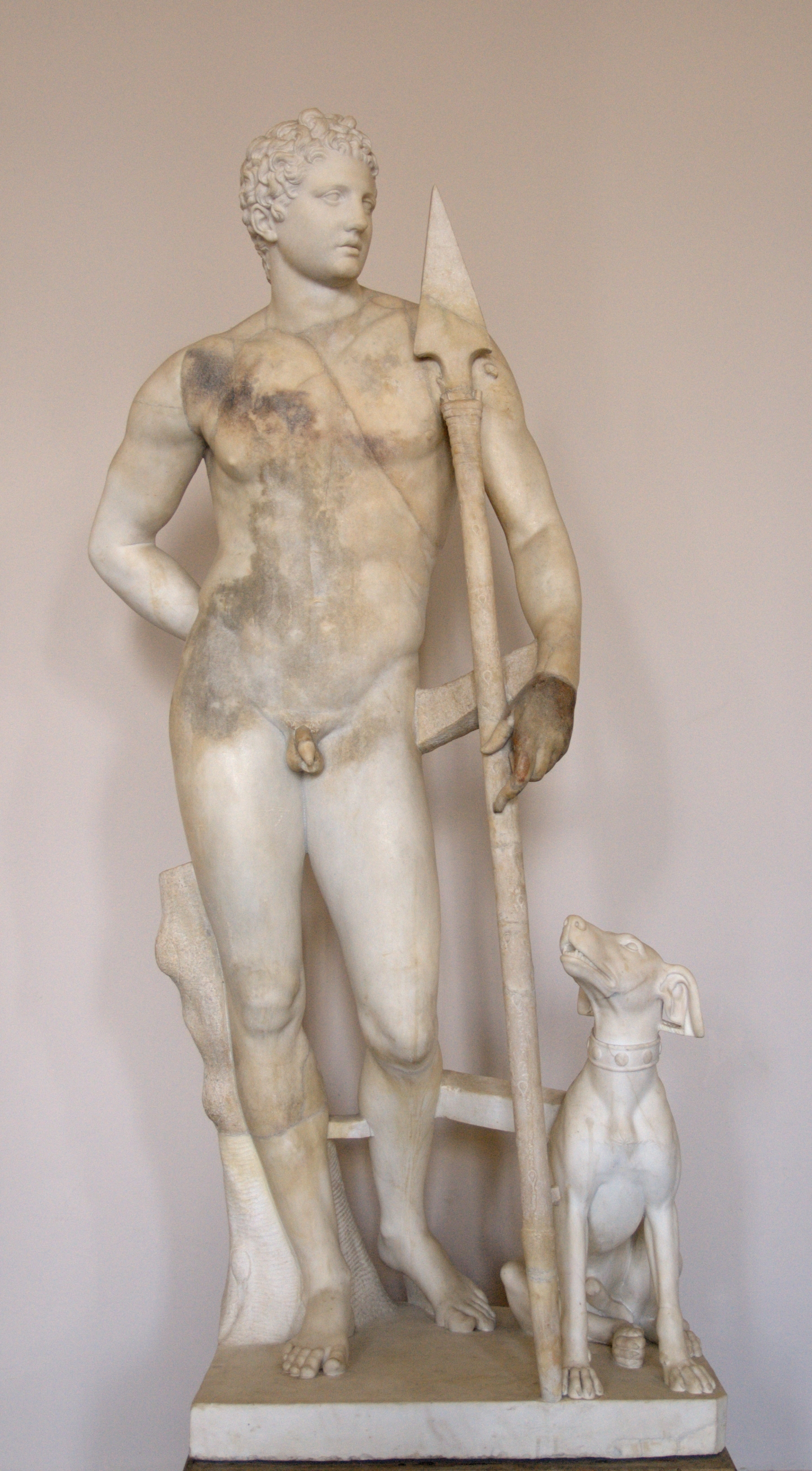
Statue of Meleager modeled after Skopas

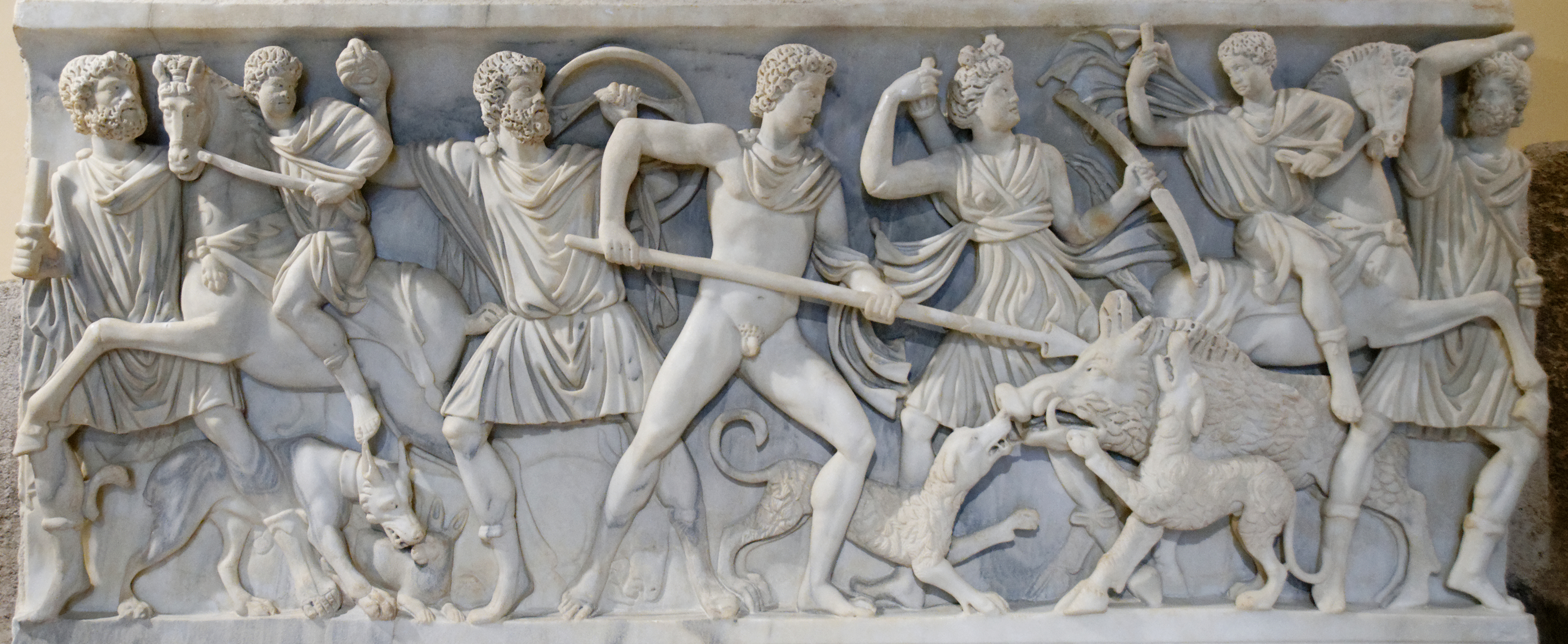
Meleager sarcophagus

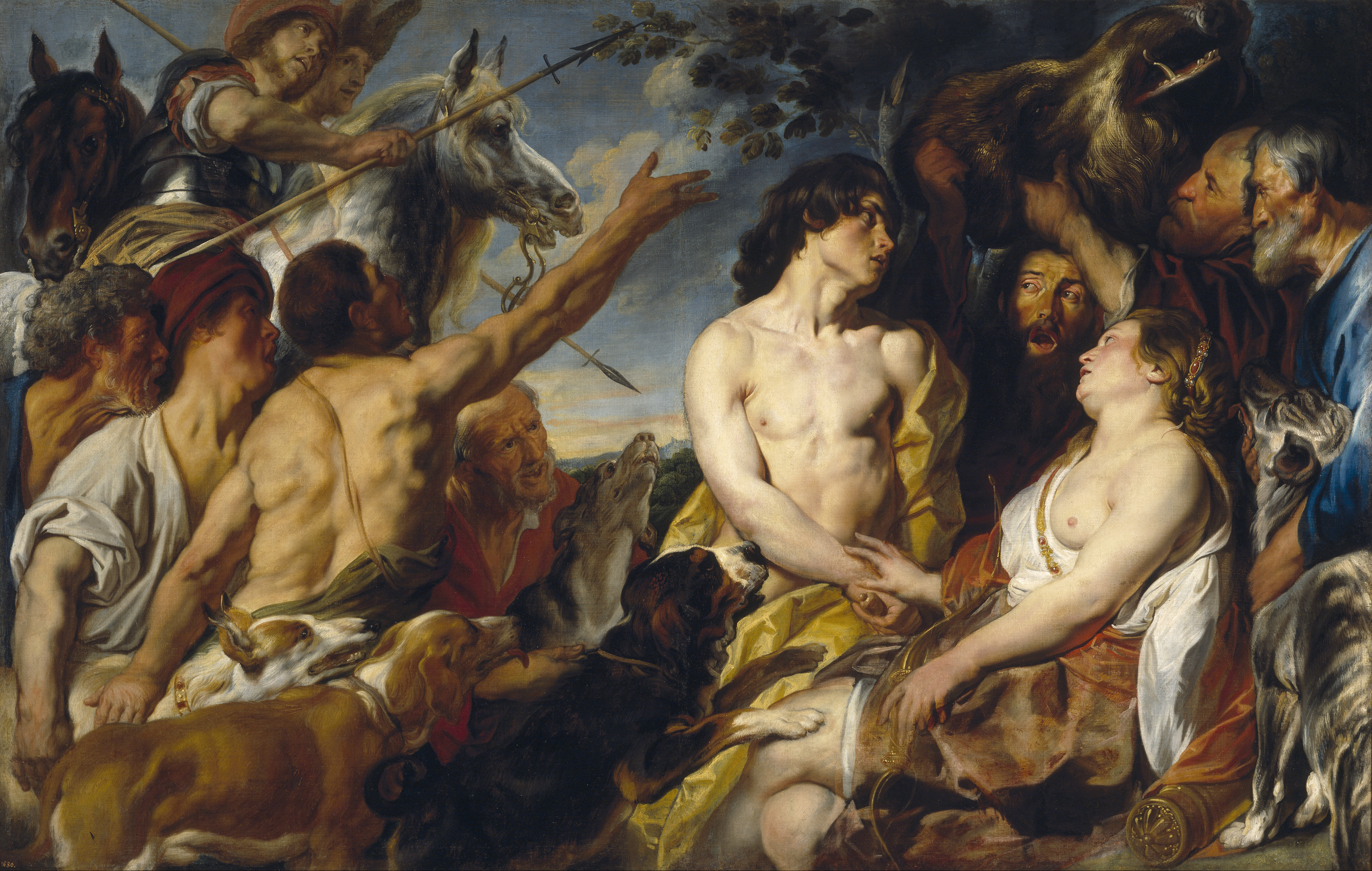
Meleager and Atalanta (17th century) by Jacob Jordaens

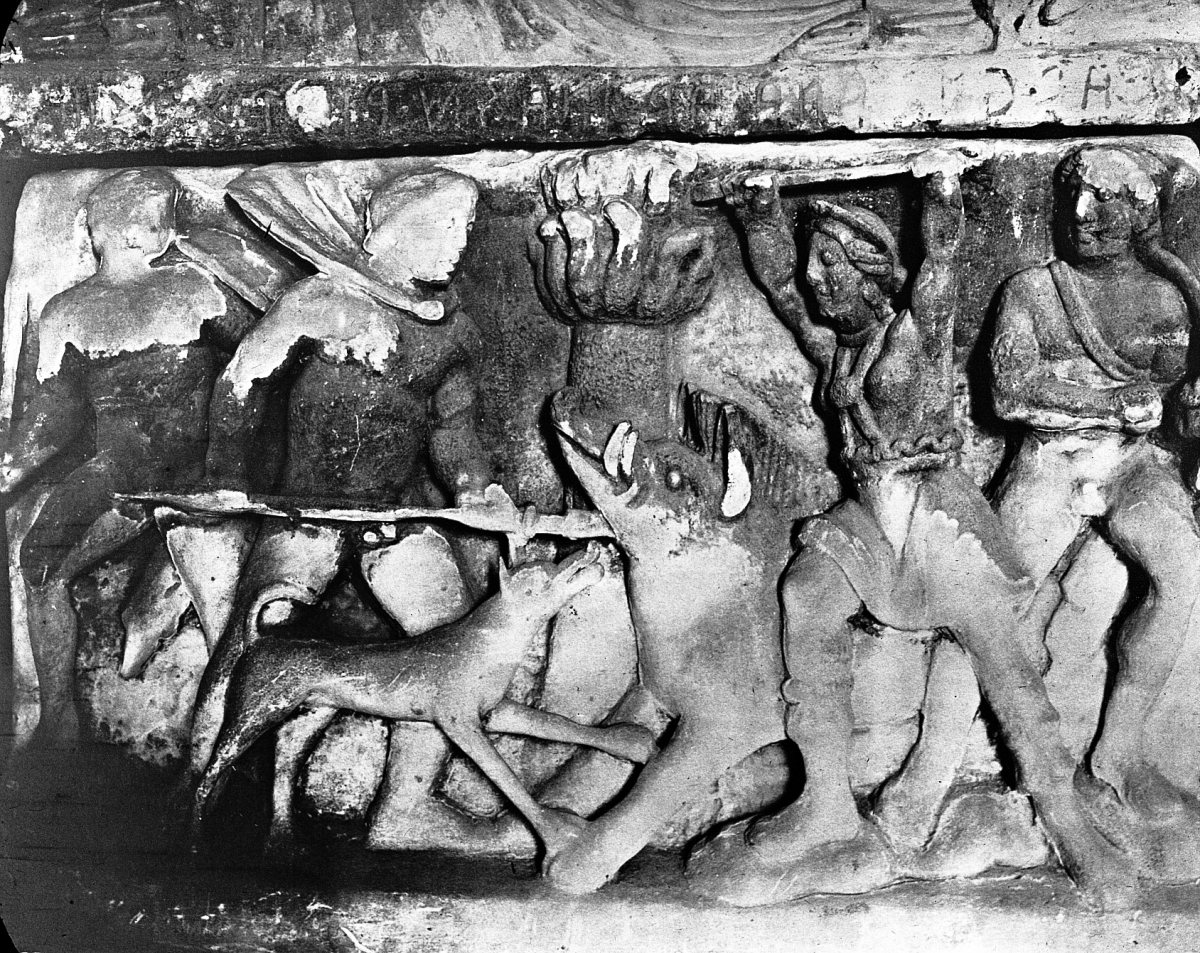
Volterra, Italy. Etruscan cinerary urn; Hunt of Maleager, Volterra. Brooklyn Museum Archives, Goodyear Archival Collection

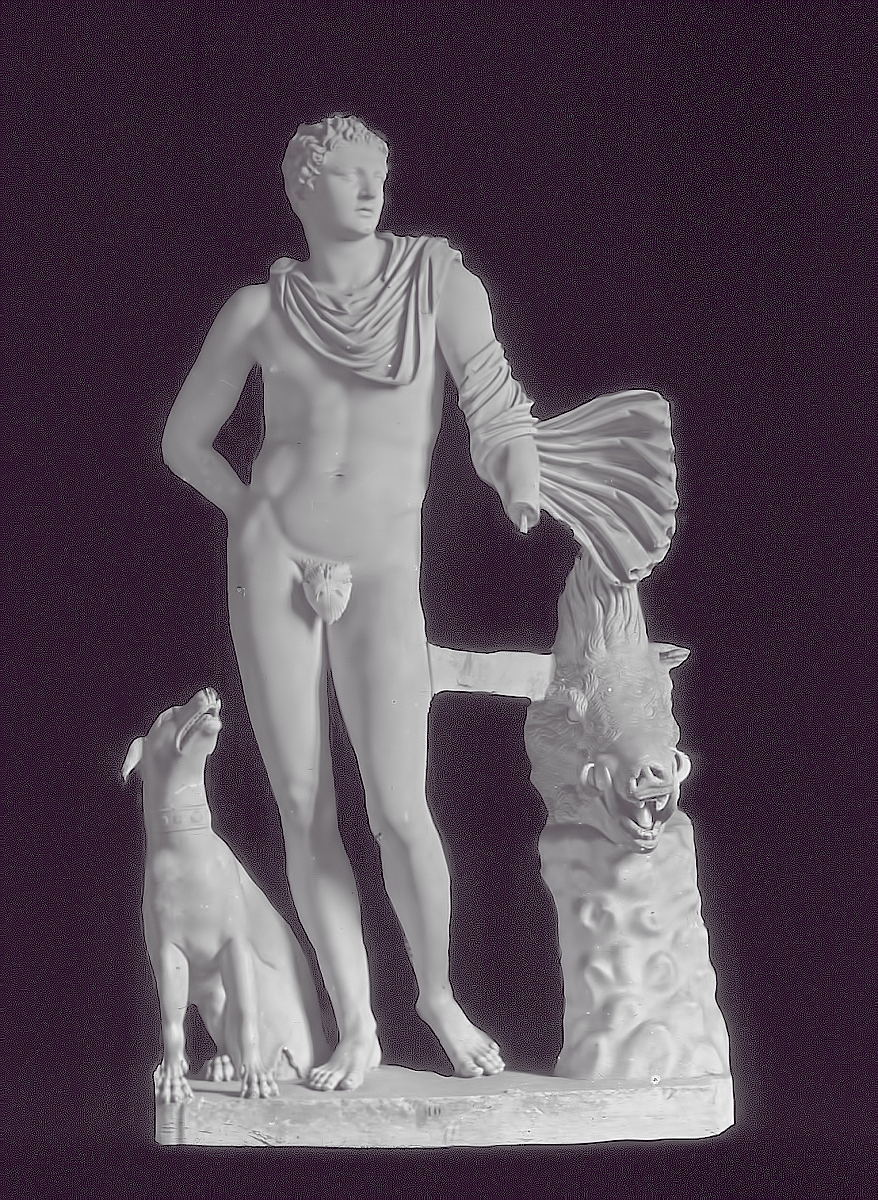
Meleager, Scopas' influence. Brooklyn Museum Archives, Goodyear Archival Collection

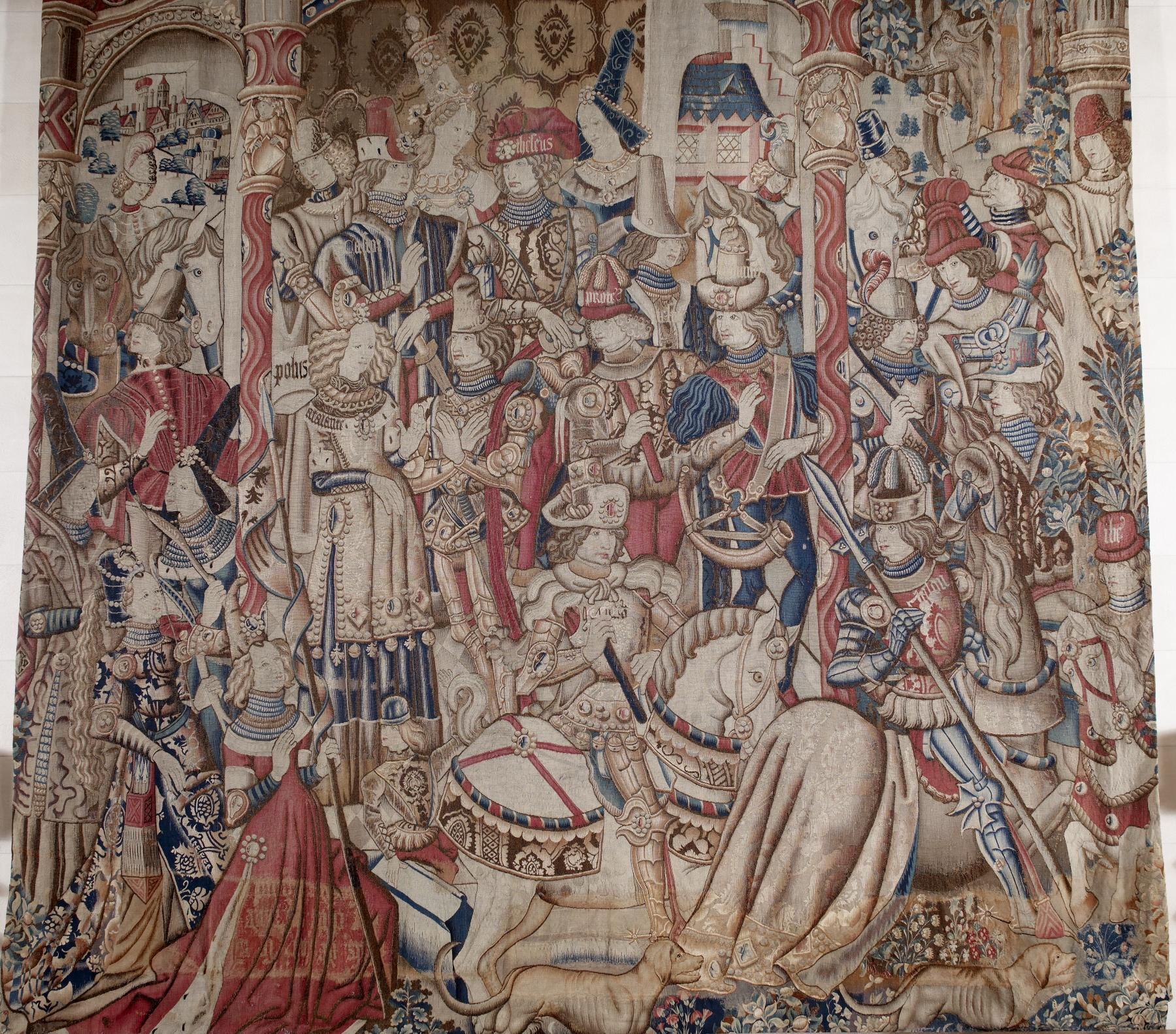
Meleager and Atalanta Setting Out to Hunt the Calydonian Boar, tapestry, Walters Art Museum

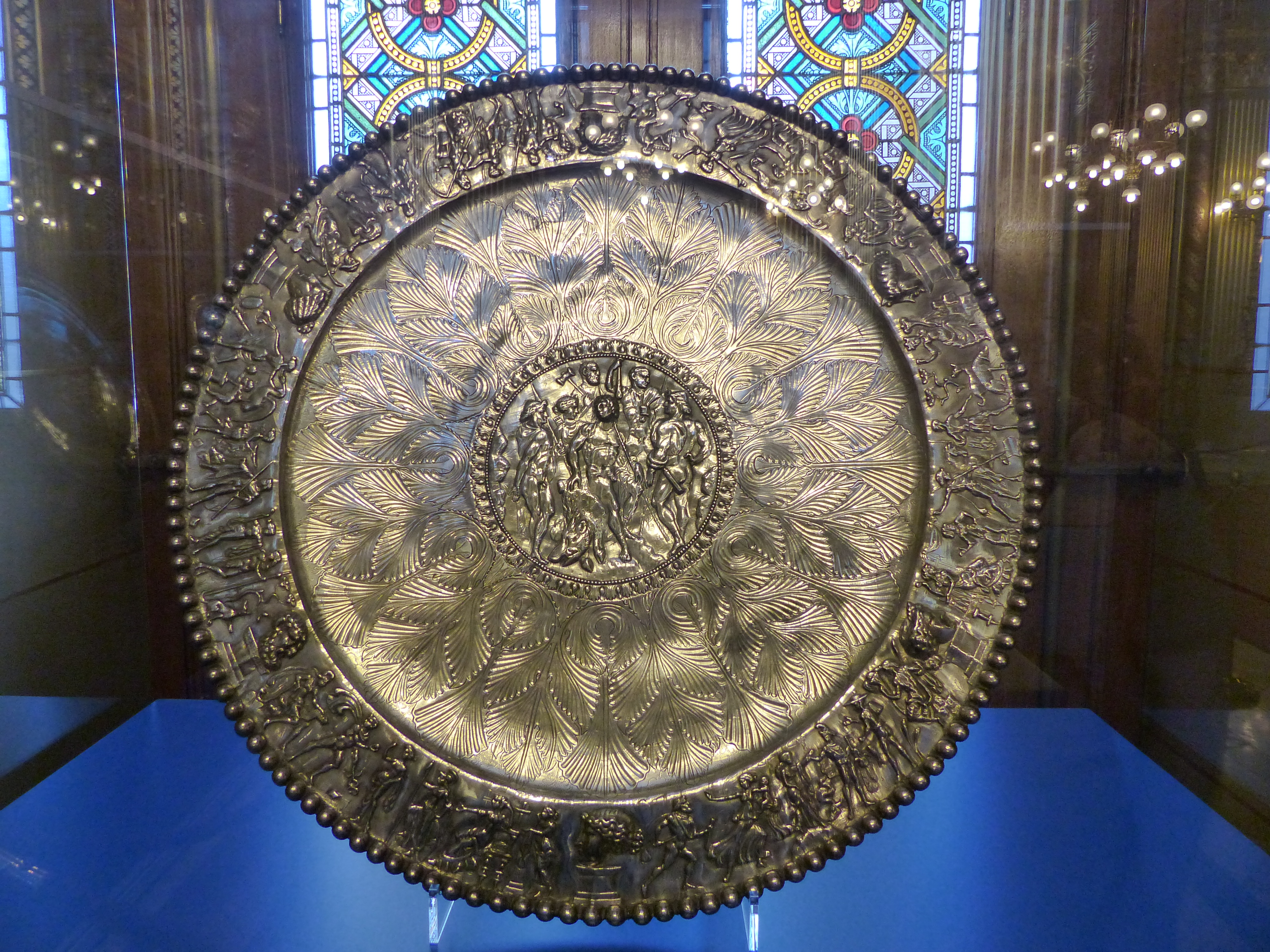
Meleager plate

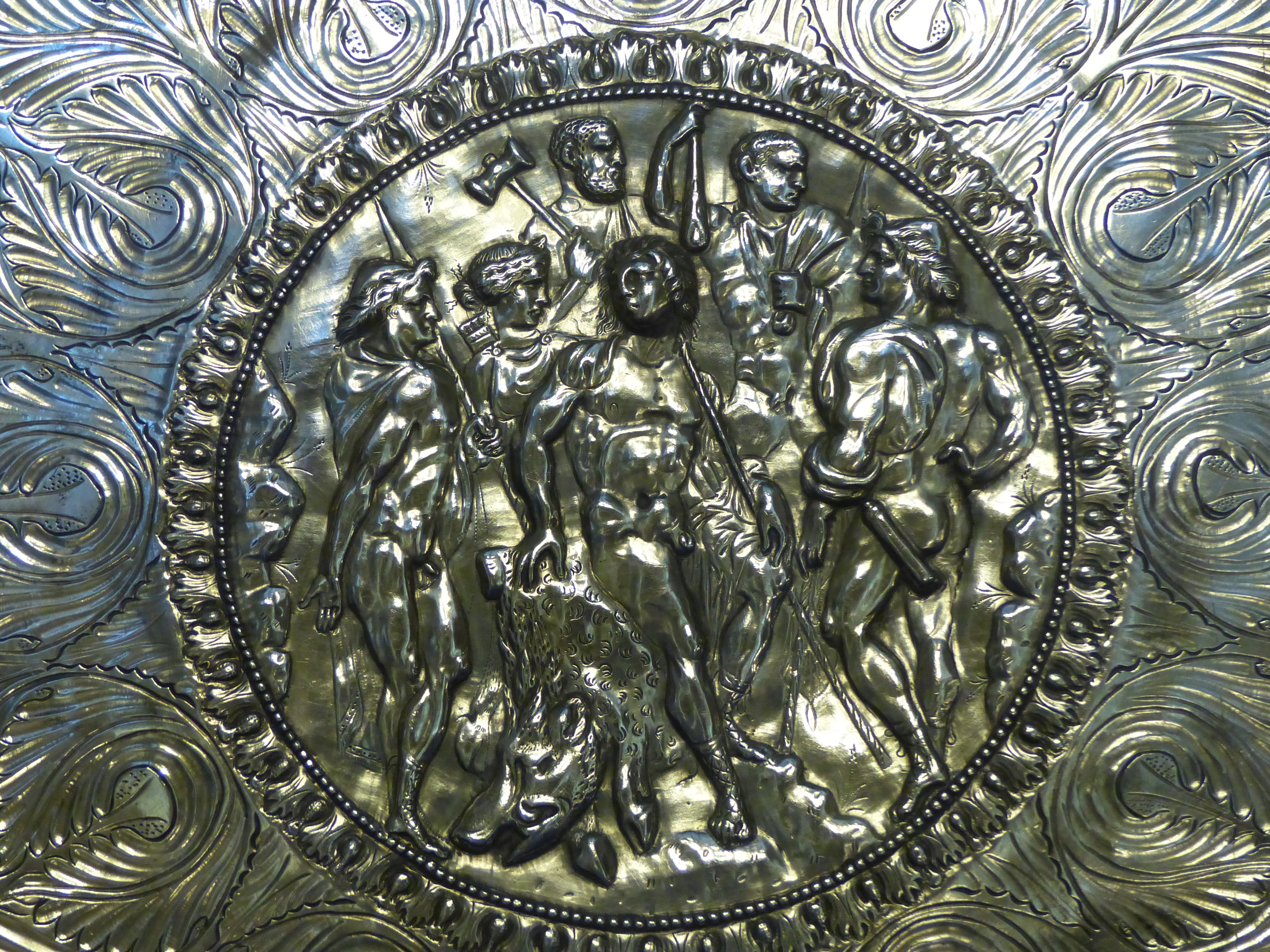
Meleager plate (detail)

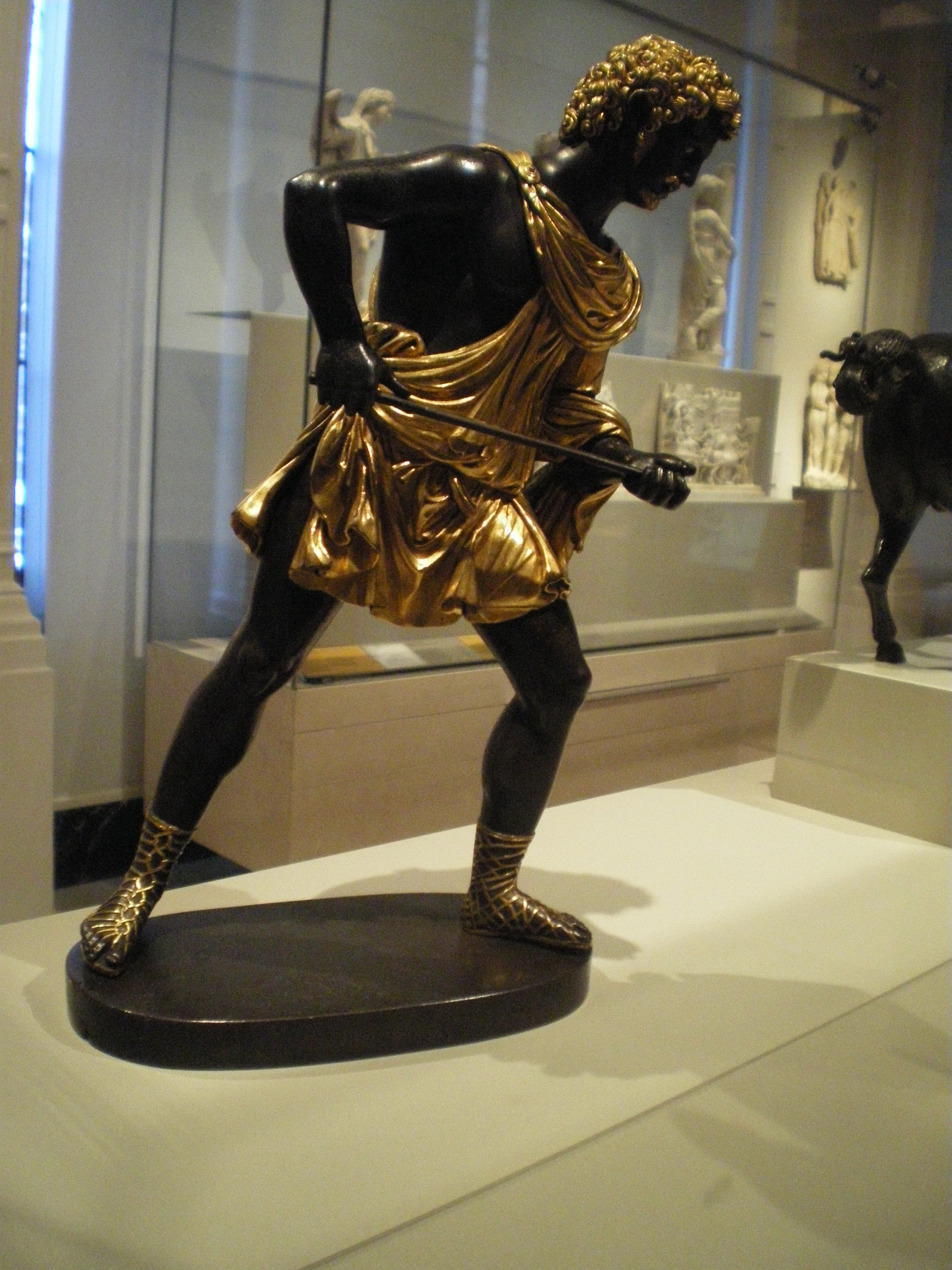
Renaissance sculpture of Meleager by Pier Jacopo Alari Bonacolsi, who was known by his contemporaries as L'Antico. V&A Museum.

== Sources ==
- Bacchylides Fr 5.93
- Apollonius Rhodius, Argonautica I, 190–201.
- Apollodorus, I, viii, 1–3.
- Ovid, Metamorphoses VIII, 269–525.
