= Phereus =

In Greek mythology, Phereus (Ancient Greek: Φηρεύς) may refer to the following personages:

- Phereus, the "playful" leader of the satyrs who joined the army of Dionysus in his campaign against India.
- Phereus, a Theban prince as one of the Niobids, children of King Amphion and Niobe, daughter of King Tantalus of Lydia. He was the brother of Alalcomeneus, Eudorus, Argeius, Lysippus, Xanthus, Pelopia, Chione, Clytia, Hore, Lamippe and Melia.
- Phereus, also called Pheres and Thyreus, a Calydonian prince as the son of King Oeneus and Althaea, daughter of King Thestius of Pleuron. He was the brother of Deianeira, Meleager, Toxeus, Clymenus, Periphas, Agelaus and Gorge. When the war between the Curetes and the Calydonians broke out, Phereus along with his brothers, including Meleager, all fell during the battle.
- Phereus, an Achaean warrior who participated in the Trojan War.
