= Glaucus (son of Sisyphus) =

King in Greek mythology

In Greek and Roman mythology, Glaucus (/ˈɡlɔːkəs/; Ancient Greek: Γλαῦκος Glaukos, romanized: Glaukos, lit. 'greyish blue', 'bluish green' or 'glimmering'), usually surnamed as Potnieus, was a son of Sisyphus whose main myth involved his violent death as the result of his horsemanship. He was the king of the Boeotian city of Potniae or sometimes of Corinth. Glaucus was the subject of a lost tragedy by Aeschylus, Glaucus Potnieus (Glaucus at Potniae), fragments of which are contained in an Oxyrhynchus Papyrus.

== Family ==
The mother of Glaucus was Merope, a daughter of Atlas and one of the Pleiades. By marrying Sisyphus, she became the only one of the Pleiades to mate with a mortal. Glaucus was the brother of Almus, Thersander and Ornytion (Porphyrion)

At first, Sisyphus had tried to arrange a marriage for Glaucus with the shape-shifting Mestra, a daughter of Erysichthon, but despite the payment of valuable bride-gifts, she eluded the marriage and was taken to an island by Poseidon. Glaucus then married a daughter of Nisus named Eurymede or Eurynome. Zeus had declared that Glaucus would sire no children even by his own wife, perhaps because of his violations against Aphrodite. While Eurynome gave birth to the famed hero Bellerophon, Poseidon is usually seen as the true father. The Iliad, however, names Glaucus as Bellerophon's father. The equine theme continues: Poseidon was associated with horses, and Bellerophon was the rider of the winged horse Pegasus. By his wife, Glaucus became the father of Alcimenes (Deliades or Piren) who was unintentionally murdered by his own hero brother. In some variants of the myth, Glaucus was the husband of Laophonte and father of Leda.

Glaucus was the ancestor of the Glaucus in the Iliad, through his son Bellerophon who ventured to Lycia.

== Mythology ==
Glaucus took part in the funeral games organized in honor of Pelias by his son Acastus, the famous Athla epi Pelia in which some of the foremost heroes of Greece competed, including the Argonauts. Glaucus lost to Iolaus in the chariot race. A fragment from Aeschylus's tragedy has sometimes been taken to mean that Glaucus died in a chariot accident on the way home, but it seems more probable that the accident occurred during the race. According to Pausanias, Glaucus haunted the Isthmian Games as a form of Taraxippus, because he was killed by his horses during the funeral games.

There are two main traditions concerning the death of Glaucus. In one, he feeds his mares on human flesh in order to make them fierce in battle, but at the games he has no supply for them, and they turn on their master and devour him instead. Servius, however, regards Glaucus as a doublet of Hippolytus: he offended the goddess Aphrodite (Venus) either by keeping his mares from mating in order to preserve their speed, or by scorning her in general. The goddess then brings retribution upon him through his horses. In other sources, the mares are driven into their man-killing frenzy by consuming either an herb in their Boeotian pasture at Potniae or water from a toxic well. Gilbert Murray saw Hippolytus, Glaucus and their ilk as undergoing sparagmos as vegetation deities.

In another tradition recorded by Probus, Glaucus's horses are the man-eating mares of Diomedes, given to him by his father, who had stolen them after Heracles took them to Eurystheus.

In the Georgics, Virgil casts the neglect of Venus as preventing the mares from mating. That the Romans considered mating a hazard of horse husbandry is indicated by a strange anecdote from Virgil's older contemporary Varro: when a stallion kept refusing to mate, the handler succeeded by covering its head; when uncovered, the stallion attacked him and killed him by biting.
