= Hypermnestra (mythology) =

In Greek mythology, Hypermnestra (Ancient Greek: Ὑπερμνήστρα, romanized: Hypermnēstra, lit. 'exceedingly memorable' or 'strong memory') or Hypermestra may refer to the following women:

- Hypermnestra, one of the Danaids.
- Hypermnestra, daughter of Thestius and Eurythemis.
- Hypermestra, another name for Mestra, daughter of Erysichthon.
