= Thyreus (mythology) =

In Greek mythology, Thyreus (Ancient Greek: Θυρέα, romanized: Thyreos, lit. 'porter' or 'shield-bearer') was a Calydonian prince as the son of King Oeneus and Althaea, daughter of King Thestius of Pleuron. He was the brother of Deianeira, Meleager, Toxeus, Clymenus, Periphas, Agelaus and Gorge. In some accounts, he was called as the "horse-taming" Pheres or as Phereus. When the war between the Curetes and the Calydonians broke out, Thyreus along with his brothers, including Meleager, all fell during the battle.
