= Pygmaeus =

In Greek mythology, Pygmaeus (Ancient Greek: Πυγμαίου, romanized: Pygmaios) was the ancestor of the Pygmies, a tribe of diminutive men living at the southernmost shores of the great earth-encircling river Okeanos. He was the son of Dorus, son of King Epaphus of Egypt. Otherwise, the Pygmies were instead called the offspring of the latter and Gaea (Earth).
