= Deianira =

Ancient Greek mythical character

- Princess of Calydon
- Member of the Calydonian Royal House
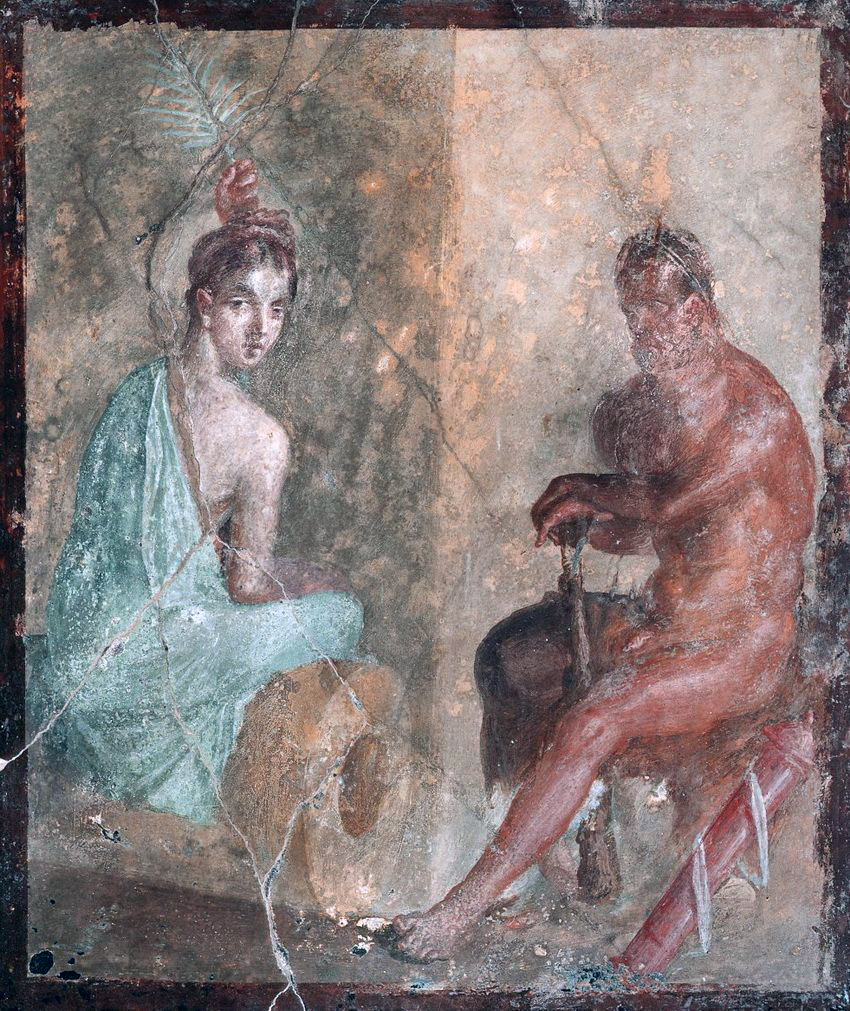
- Heracles and Deianira antique fresco in Pompeii
- Other names: Deïanira, Deianeira, Diyeneira, Deyanire, or Dejanira
- Abode: Calydon

Genealogy
- Parents: Althaea and Oeneus or Dionysus or Dexamenus
- Siblings: Meleager, Toxeus, Clymenus, Periphas, Agelaus, Thyreus, Gorge, Eurymede, Mothone, Perimede, Melanippe, and Tydeus (if Oeneus was her father) Eurypylus, Theronice and Theraephone (if Dexamenus was her father)
- Consort: Heracles
- Offspring: Hyllus; Ctesippus; Glenus; Onites; Macaria

Deianira, Deïanira, or Deianeira (/ˌdiːəˈnaɪrə/ DEE-ə-NY-rə; Ancient Greek: Δηϊάνειρα, romanized: Dēiáneira, or Δῃάνειρα, Dēáneira, IPA: [dɛːiáneːra]), also known as Dejanira, is a Calydonian princess in Greek mythology whose name translates as "man-destroyer" or "destroyer of her husband". She was the wife of Heracles and, in late Classical accounts, his unwitting murderer, killing him with the poisoned Shirt of Nessus. She is the main character in Sophocles' play Women of Trachis.

== Family ==
Deianira was the daughter of Althaea and her husband Oeneus (whose name means "wine-man"), the king of Calydon (after the wine-god gave the king the vine to cultivate), and the sister of Meleager. Her other siblings were Toxeus, Clymenus, Periphas, Agelaus (or Ageleus), Thyreus (or Phereus or Pheres), Gorge, Eurymede and Melanippe.

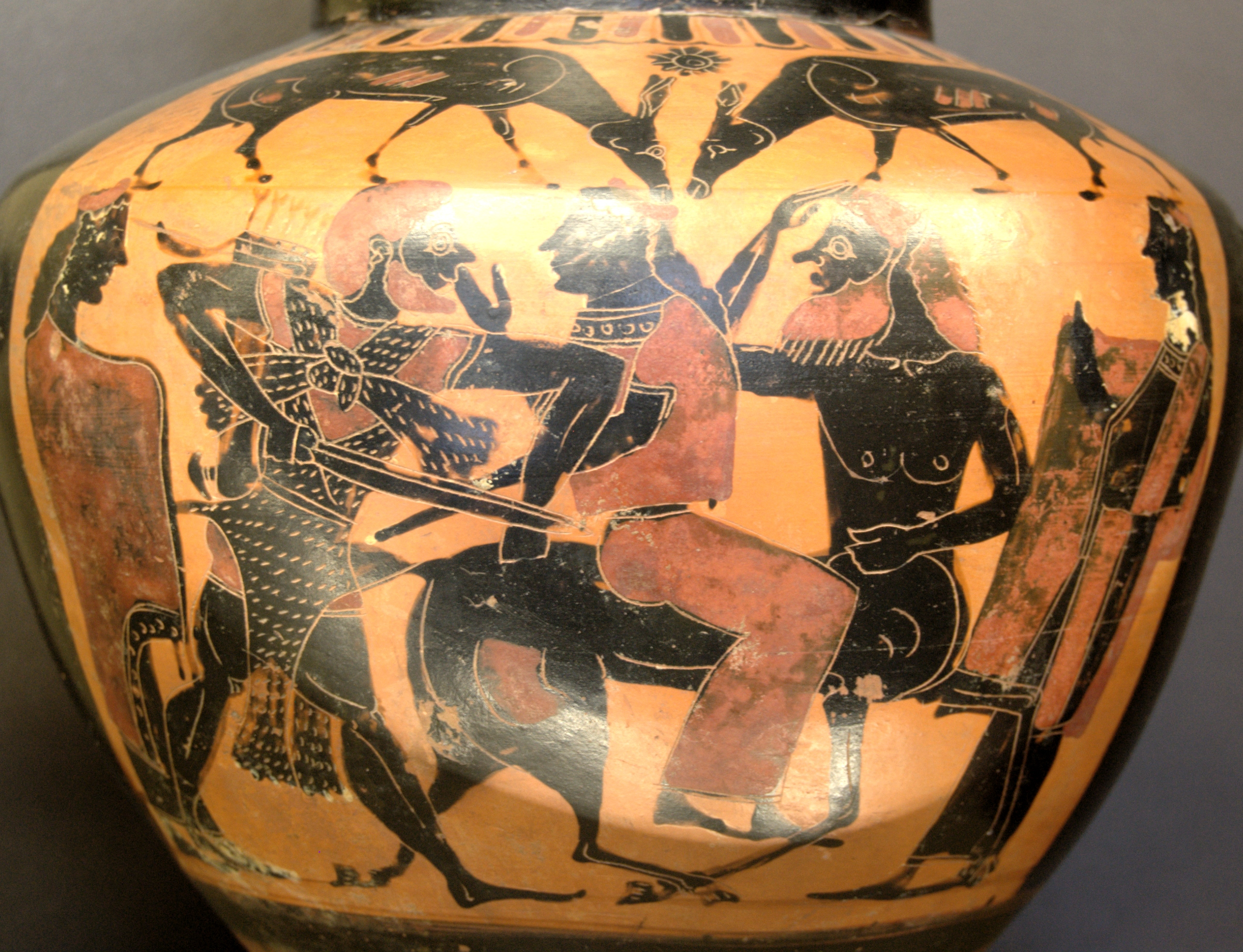
Heracles, Deianira and Nessus, black-figure hydria, 575-550 BCE, Louvre (E 803)

In some accounts, Deianira was the daughter of King Dexamenus of Olenus and thus, sister to Eurypylus, Theronice and Theraephone. Others called this daughter of Dexamenus as Mnesimache or Hippolyte.

Deianira was the mother of Onites, Hyllus, Glenus, Ctesippus, and Macaria, who saved the Athenians from defeat by Eurystheus.

== Mythology and literature ==
=== Marriage ===
In Sophocles' account of Deianira's marriage, she was courted by the river god Achelous, but was saved from having to marry him by Heracles, who defeated Achelous in a wrestling contest for her hand in marriage.

In another version of the tale, where she was described as the daughter of Dexamenus, Heracles raped her and promised to come back and marry her. While he was away, the centaur Eurytion appeared and demanded her as his wife. Her father, being afraid, agreed, but Heracles returned before the marriage and slew the centaur and claimed his bride.

Deianira was associated with combat, and was described as someone who "drove a chariot and practiced the art of war."

=== Death of Heracles ===
The most famous story containing Deianira concerns the Shirt of Nessus. A wild centaur named Nessus attempted to kidnap or rape Deianira as he was ferrying her across the river Euenos, but she was rescued by Heracles, who shot the centaur with an arrow laced with the venom of the Hydra. As he lay dying, Nessus persuaded Deianira to take a sample of his blood, claiming that, when mixed with his semen, it would create a love potion that would ensure Heracles would never again be unfaithful.

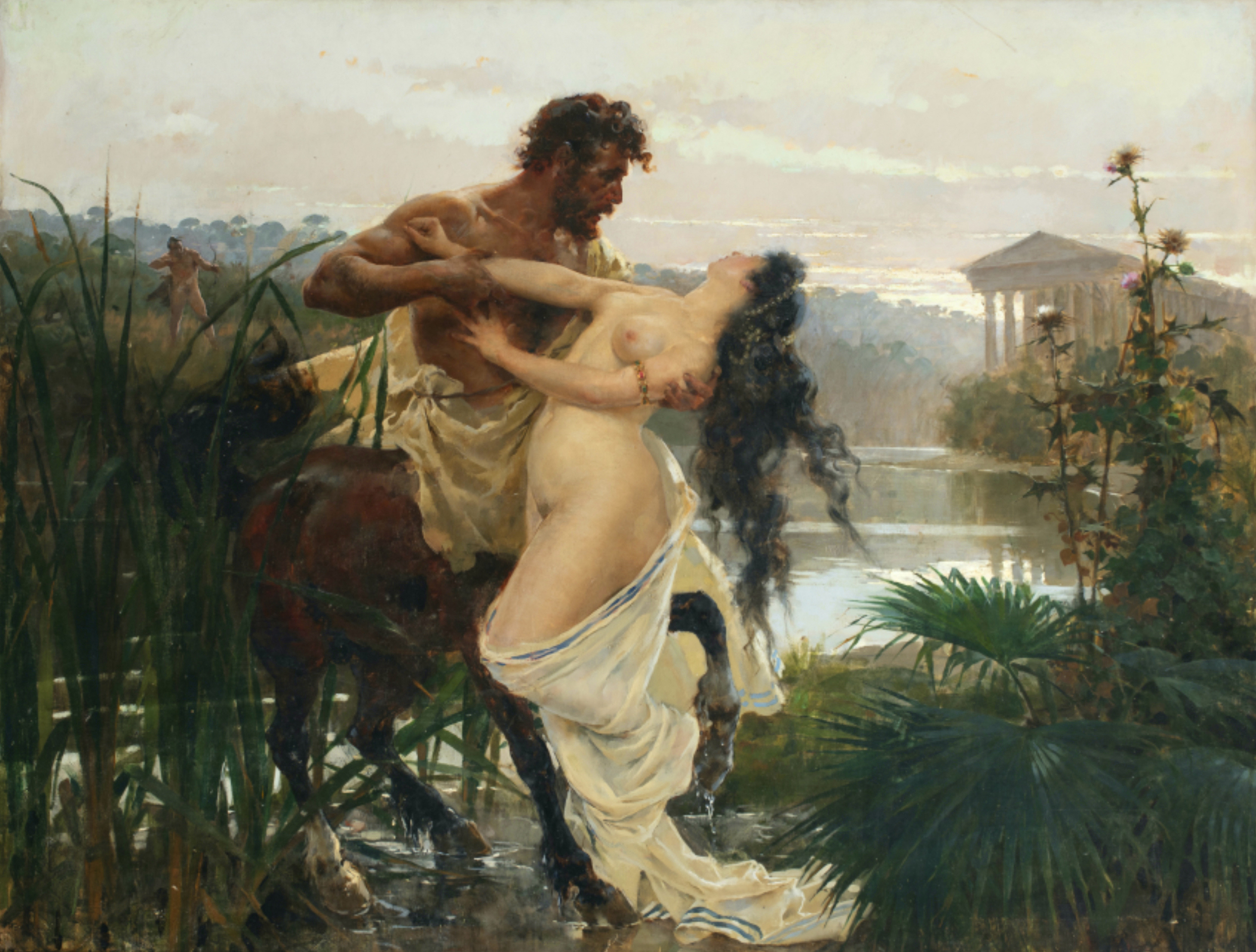
Nessus and Deianira, Enrique Simonet, 1888.

When Heracles fell in love with the younger and more beautiful Iole, Deianira, fearing that she would lose her husband, decided to use the potion. She soaked a tunic or shirt (perhaps Heracles' famous lionskin shirt) in the potion. When Heracles put on the shirt, the venom from the very arrow he had used to kill Nessus began to burn and eat away at his skin. When he tried to remove the shirt, he tore off chunks of his own flesh. Eventually, unable to bear the pain any longer, Heracles built a funeral pyre and immolated himself. When Deianira realized what she had done, she committed suicide, either by hanging or by a sword.

=== Middle Age tradition ===
She is remembered in De Mulieribus Claris, a collection of biographies of historical and mythological women by the Florentine author Giovanni Boccaccio, composed in 1361–62. It is notable as an early collection devoted exclusively to biographies of women, following such ancient examples as Hesiod's Catalogue of Women.

Preceded by Omphale	Wives of Heracles	Succeeded by Hebe

== Calydonian family tree ==
Calydonian dynasty

Dorus	Aetolus	Pronoe	Amythaon
Xanthippe	Pleuron	Calydon	Aeolia
Sterope	Stratonice	Laophonte	Agenor	Epicaste	Cleoboea	Protogeneia	Ares
Euryte	Porthaon	Demonice	Thestius	Eurythemis	Oxylus
Oeneus	Althaea	Toxeus	Evippus	Plexippus	Eurypylus	Leda
Periphas	Toxeus	Deianira	Gorge	Perimede	Phoenix	Oecles	Hypermnestra
Clymenus	Melanippe	Thoas	Astypalaea	Poseidon	Polyboea	Iphianeira	Amphiaraus
Methone	Agelaus	Ancaeus	Eurypylus	Clytie
Thyreus	Eurymede	Heracles	Chalciope
Meleager	Thessalus
