= Myconus (mythology) =

In Greek mythology a local hero and a ruler of Mykonos

In Greek mythology, Myconus (/ˈmɪkənɒs, -noʊs/, also UK: /ˈmiːk-/; Ancient Greek: Μύκονος [ˈmikonos] Mykonos) or Mycon was a local hero and an eponymous first ruler of Mykonos. He was the son or grandson of the god Apollo.

== Mythology ==
Mycon was the father of Xanthippe who fed him with her own breastmilk to prevent him from dying of starvation when he was imprisoned. The daughter was also known as Pero.

The island of Mykonos was also said to have been the location of the Gigantomachy, the great battle between Zeus and Giants and where Hercules killed the invincible giants, having lured them from the protection of Mount Olympus. According to myth, the large rocks all over the island are said to be the petrified corpses of the giants.
