= Mestra =

Mythical daughter of Erysichthon

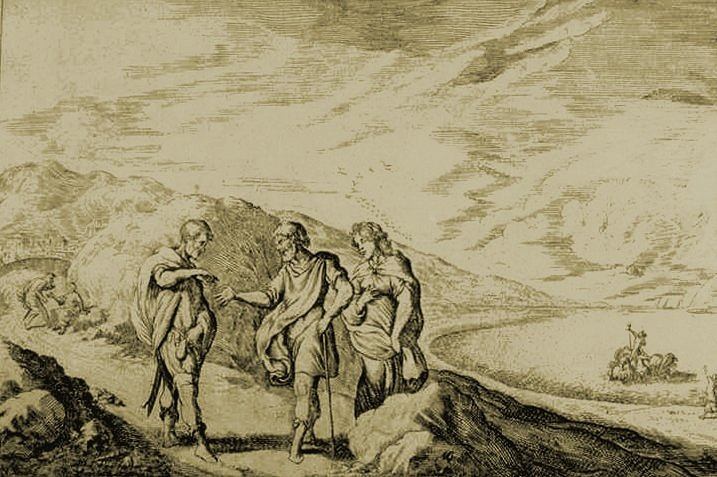
Erysichthon sells his daughter Mestra. An engraving from among Johann Wilhelm Baur's illustrations of Ovid's Metamorphoses. Poseidon can be seen in the lower-right background.

In Greek mythology, Mestra (Ancient Greek: Μήστρα, Mēstra) was a daughter of Erysichthon of Thessaly. Antoninus Liberalis called her Hypermestra and Erysichthon Aethon. According to Ovid, she was married to the thief Autolycus. She was granted the ability to shapeshift by Poseidon.

== Mythology ==
According to Ovid's Metamorphoses, Erysichthon had angered Demeter by violating one of her sacred groves, and he was cursed with insatiable hunger. Having exhausted all his wealth on food, he sells his daughter Mestra into slavery.

Unwilling to remain a slave, Mestra prays to Poseidon, who had previously deflowered her, to rescue her. The god transforms her into a fisherman. When her purchaser searches for her, Mestra, in disguise, convincingly denies seeing any woman on the shore and he leaves, deceived. Mestra returns home, and her father soon discovers her ability to change shape. He repeatedly sells her to different buyers, but each time, she escapes by transforming into various animals, returning home, and providing her father with the proceeds to buy more food. In the end, driven by his relentless hunger, Erysichthon eats himself to death.

In Hesiod's Catalogue of Women, rather than selling her into slavery, Erysichthon would repeatedly sell his daughter to suitors for the bride prices they would pay. Sisyphus also hoped to win her as a bride for his son Glaucus, although that marriage did not take place. Ultimately, Poseidon carried away Mestra to the island of Cos, and she bore him a son, Eurypylus.

"And earth-shaking Poseidon overpowered her
far from her father, carrying her over the wine-dark sea
in sea-girt Cos, clever though she was;
there she bore Eurypylus, commander of many people."

== Popular Culture ==
Mestra is the protagonist of the 2026 short story Mestra by Madeline Miller.
