= Gorge (mythology) =

Characters in Greek mythology called "Gorge"

In Greek mythology, Gorge (Ancient Greek: Γόργη, romanized: Gorgē, derived from the adjective gorgos, "terrible" or "horrible") may refer to the following women:

- Gorge, a Libyan princess as one of the 50 Danaïdes, daughters of King Danaus of Libya (and later Argos). Her mother was either the hamadryads Atlanteia or Phoebe and thus, probably the full sister of two Hippodamias, Rhodia, Cleopatra, Asteria, Glauce, Hippomedusa, Iphimedusa and Rhode. On the orders of her father, she married and eventually murdered her cousin–husband Hippothous, son of Aegyptus and an Arabian woman.
- Gorge, a Calydonian princess as the daughter of King Oeneus and Althaea, daughter of King Thestius of Pleuron. She was the sister of Deianeira, Meleager, Toxeus, Clymenus, Periphas, Agelaus (or Ageleus), Thyreus (or Phereus or Pheres), Eurymede and Melanippe. Gorge married Andraemon and became the mother of a son Thoas who led the Aetolian contingent for the Greeks in the Trojan War. Artemis changed her sisters into birds because of their constant mourning over the death of their brother Meleager, but spared Gorge and Deianeira. Apollodorus says that according to Pisander, she was the mother of Tydeus by her own father Oeneus, because "Zeus willed it that Oeneus should fall in love with his own daughter".
- Gorge, a woman of Lemnos who slew Elymus the night Lemnian women killed their men.
- Gorge, a Maenad in the retinue of Dionysus during his Indian campaign.
