= Deliades (mythology) =

Son of Glaucus in Greek mythology

In Greek mythology, Deliades (Ancient Greek: Δηλιάδην) or Heliades (Ἡλιάδην) was a son of Glaucus, the son of Sisyphus. He was unintentionally killed by his own brother Bellerophon. According to some traditions, the name of the brother was instead Alcimenes or Peiren.
