= Potniae =

Coordinates: 38°18′00″N 23°18′42″E

Potniae or Potniai (Ancient Greek: Πότνιαι) was a village of ancient Boeotia, on the road from Thebes to Plataea, distant 10 stadia from the former city. It was in ruins in the time of Pausanias (2nd century), and contained a grove sacred to Demeter and Kore. Potniae is celebrated in mythology as the residence of Glaucus, who was torn to pieces by his infuriated mares. According to Strabo, some authorities regarded Potniae as the Hypothebae of Homer.

Its site is located near modern Takhi.
