= Dorus (mythology) =

In Greek mythology, Dorus (Ancient Greek: Δῶρος, romanized: Doros, lit. 'probably derived from doron ‘gift' may refer to the following characters:

- Dorus, an Egyptian prince as the son of King Epaphus of Egypt. He was the father of Pygmaeus, ancestor of the tribe of Pygmies.
- Dorus, the son of Hellen, brother of Aeolus and Xuthus, and founder of the Dorian nation.
- Dorus, the Aetolian son of Apollo and Phthia, and brother of Laodocus and Polypoites. He was the father of Xanthippe, who married Pleuron, son of Aetolus, the man who killed Dorus and his brothers.
- Dorus, father of Cleues, a descendant of Agamemnon.
