= Xanthippe (mythology) =

In Greek mythology, Xanthippe (Ancient Greek: Ξανθίππη "blonde horse" derived from ξανθος xanthos "blonde/golden" and ‘ιππος hippos "horse") is a name that may refer to:

- Xanthippe, daughter of Dorus, son of Apollo and Phthia. She was the wife of King Pleuron and mother by him of Agenor, Sterope, Stratonice and Laophonte.
- Xanthippe, daughter of Myconus. She fed her imprisoned father with her own breastmilk to prevent him from dying of starvation. She is also known as Pero.
- Xanthippe, an Amazon who is depicted confronting Iolaus on a red-figure vase painting.
