= Melanippe =

List of people of Greek mythology

The name Melanippe is the feminine counterpart of Melanippus.

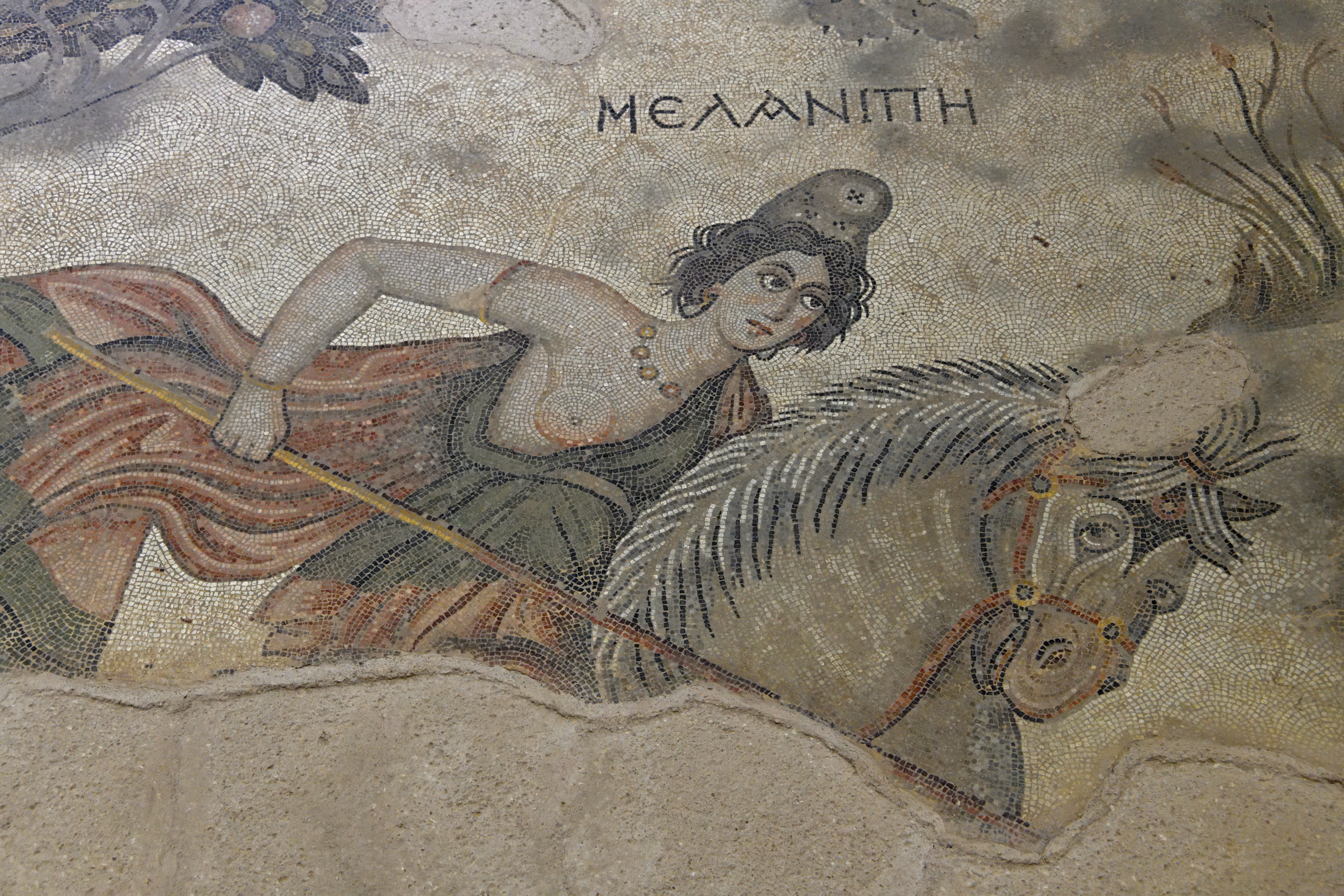
Amazon Melanippe on a late antique mosaic

In Greek mythology, the name Melanippe (Ancient Greek: Μελανίππη, romanized: Melanippê, lit. 'black mare' or 'black horse'; pronounced /mɛləˈnɪpi/ or /mɛləˈnɪpaɪ/, mel-uh-NIP-ee) referred to several different people:

- Melanippe, daughter of the Centaur Chiron. Also known as Hippe or Euippe. She bore a daughter to Aeolus, Melanippe or Arne (see below). She escaped to Mount Pelion so that her father would not find out that she was pregnant, but, being searched for, she prayed to Artemis asking for assistance, and the goddess transformed her into a mare. Other accounts state that the transformation was a punishment for her having scorned Artemis, or for having divulged the secrets of gods. She was later placed among the stars.
- Melanippe, daughter of Aeolus and the precedent Melanippe (or else daughter of Hippotes or of Desmontes).
- Melanippe, a Aetolian princess as the daughter of King Oeneus of Calydon and Althaea, daughter of King Thestius of Pleuron. As one of the Meleagrids, she was turned into a guinea fowl by Artemis after the death of her brother, Meleager.
- Melanippe, an Amazon, sister of Hippolyta, Penthesilea and Antiope, daughter of Ares. Heracles captured her and demanded Hippolyte's girdle in exchange for her freedom. Hippolyte complied and Heracles let her go. Some say that it was Melanippe whom Theseus abducted and married. Yet others relate that she was killed by Telamon.
- Melanippe, wife of Hippotes, son of Mimas, himself son of Aeolus, and the mother of another Aeolus.
- Melanippe, a nymph who married Itonus, son of Amphictyon.
- Melanippe, possible wife of King Chalcodon of Euboea and mother of Elephenor.
- Melanippe, an emendation for "Medippe" (name of one of the sacrificial victims of Minotaur) in Servius' commentaries on Aeneid.
