= Curetes (tribe) =

Legendary people in Greek mythology

In Greek mythology and epic literature, the Curetes (Ancient Greek: Κουρῆτες) were legendary people who took part in the quarrel over the Calydonian boar. Strabo mentioned that the Curetes were assigned multiple identities and places of origin (i.e. either Acarnanians, Aetolians, from Crete, or from Euboea). However, he clarified the identity of the Curetes and regarded them solely as Aetolians. Dionysius of Halicarnassus mentioned the Curetes as the old name of the Aetolians.

Their capital was Pleuron and they were in constant conflict with Oeneus who founded Calydon.

== Sources ==
- Showerman, Grant (1911). "Curetes" . In Chisholm, Hugh (ed.). Encyclopædia Britannica. Vol. 7 (11th ed.). Cambridge University Press. p. 637.
