= Pheremmelias =

In Greek mythology, Pheremmelias (Ancient Greek: Φερεμμελίας) was the Spartan son of Icarius and Asterodia, daughter of Eurypylus. He was the brother of Amasichus, Thoon, Phalereus, Perilaos, Penelope and Laodamia (also called Mede or Hypsipyle). Otherwise, the children of Icarius and Asterodia were named as Polymelos, Damasiclus (Amasiclus), Penelope and Laodice (Iphthime).
