= Icarius (Spartan) =

Greek mythological king; father of Penelope

In Greek mythology, Icarius (/ɪˈkɛəriəs/; Ancient Greek: Ἰκάριος, romanized: Ikários) was a Spartan king and a champion runner.

== Family ==
Icarius was the son of either Perieres and Gorgophone or of Oebalus and Bateia and thus brother of Hippocoon and Tyndareus. By the naiad Periboea, he became the father of Penelope, Perileos, Thoas, Damasippus, Imeusimus, Aletes and Iphthime. According to other traditions, the mother of Penelope, Alyzeus and Leucadius was Polycaste, daughter of Lygaeus.

His other possible wives were Dorodoche (daughter of Ortilochus) and Asterodia (daughter of Eurypylus). The latter was said to have born him the following children:

- Polymelos, Damasiclus (Amasiclus), Penelope and Laodice; or
- Amasichus, Phalereus, Thoon, Pheremmelias, Perilaos, Penelope and Laodamia (also called Mede or Hypsipyle).

In some accounts, Icarius was the father of Elatus who fathered Taenarus by Erymede, daughter Damasiclus. Otherwise, Taenarus was called Icarius’ son with no mention of the birth mother.

Comparative table of Icarius family
Relation	Name	Sources								
Relation	Name	Homer			Apollonius	Strabo	Apollodorus		Stephanus	Tzetzes
Relation	Name	Ody.	Sch.		Sch. Argo.	Strabo	Apollodorus		Stephanus	Lyco.
Parentage	Perieres and Gorgophone						✓			✓
Parentage	Oebalus and Bateia							✓		
Siblings	Tyndareus						✓	✓		✓
Siblings	Aphareus						✓			✓
Siblings	Leucippus						✓			✓
Siblings	Hippocoon							✓		
Spouse	Asterodia		✓							
Spouse	Dorodoche			✓						
Spouse	Periboea						✓			
Spouse	Polycaste					✓				
Offspring	Penelope	✓				✓	✓			
Offspring	Iphthime	✓					✓			
Offspring	Laodamia or		✓							
Offspring	Laodice		✓							
Offspring	Perilaus or		✓				✓			
Offspring	Perileos									
Offspring	Amasichus		✓							
Offspring	Phalereus		✓							
Offspring	Thoon		✓							
Offspring	Pheremmelias		✓							
Offspring	Elatus				✓					
Offspring	Alyzeus					✓				
Offspring	Leucadius					✓				
Offspring	Aletes						✓			
Offspring	Damasippus						✓			
Offspring	Imeusimus						✓			
Offspring	Thoas						✓			
Offspring	Taenarus								✓	

== Mythology ==
Hippocoon, a natural son of Oebalus, expelled his two brothers, Tyndareus and Icarius, from Lacedaemon: they fled to Thestius at Pleuron, and dwelt beyond the river Achelous. Subsequently, when Heracles had slain Hippocoon and his sons, Tyndareus returned to Sparta, while Icarius remained in Acarnania. According to Apollodorus, however, Icarius also returned. Another tradition relates that Icarius, who sided with Hippocoon, assisted him in expelling Tyndareus from Sparta. While in Acarnania, Icarius became the father of the above progeny.

Icarius was a Spartan king and a champion runner who would not allow anyone to marry his daughter unless he beat him in a race. Odysseus succeeded and married Penelope, but according to others, Tyndareus sued for the hand of Penelope for Odysseus, from gratitude for a piece of advice which Odysseus had given him. After they got married, Icarius tried to persuade Odysseus to remain in Sparta. He did leave with Penelope, but Icarius followed them, imploring his daughter to stay. Odysseus told her she must choose whether to be with her father or with her husband. Penelope did not answer, but modestly covered her face with a veil. Icarius correctly understood that this was a sign of her will to leave with Odysseus, let them go and erected a statue of Aidos (Modesty) on the spot. Icarius was apparently still alive at the time of the events of the Odyssey.
