= Apheidas (son of Arcas) =

Apheidas (/əˈfaɪdəs/; Ancient Greek: Ἀφείδας) was, in Greek mythology, the son of Arcas by either Erato, Leaneira (or Laodameia), Meganeira (daughter of Crocon), or the nymph Chrysopeleia. Through this parentage, he was the brother of Elatus, Azan and Tripylus. Aphidas's children were Aleus and Stheneboea. After his father's death, Apheidas became king of Tegea.
