= Geraestus =

Geraestus or Geraistos (Ancient Greek: Γεραιστός) may refer to:

Mythical figures:

- Geraestus, a son of Zeus and brother of Taenarus
- Geraestus, a Cyclops on whose grave in Attica Hyacinthus of Lacedaemon had his daughters sacrificed

Geographical names:

- Geraistos, the southernmost cape of Euboea, now Cape Mandelo
- Geraestus (Euboea), an ancient port in Euboea
