= Phalerus =

Ancient Greek mythological figure

In Greek mythology, Phalerus (/fəˈliːrəs/; Ancient Greek: Φάληρος, romanized: Phálēros, lit. 'bright' or 'shining') or Phalereus (Ancient Greek: Φαληρεὺς, romanized: Phalēreus, lit. 'of or from Phalerum') may refer to the following characters:

- Phalerus, one of the Argonauts and son of Alcon from Athens.
- Phalerus or Phalereus, one of the Lapiths who attended the wedding of Pirithous and Hippodamia, and fought against the centaurs during the celebrated Centauromachy.
- Phalereus, the Spartan son of Icarius and Asterodia, daughter of Eurypylus. He was the brother of Amasichus, Thoon, Pheremmelias, Perilaos, Penelope and Laodamia (also called Mede or Hypsipyle).
- Phalerus, a Trojan warrior who was killed by Neoptolemus.
