= Fields of sorrow =

Mythic location in the Aeneid

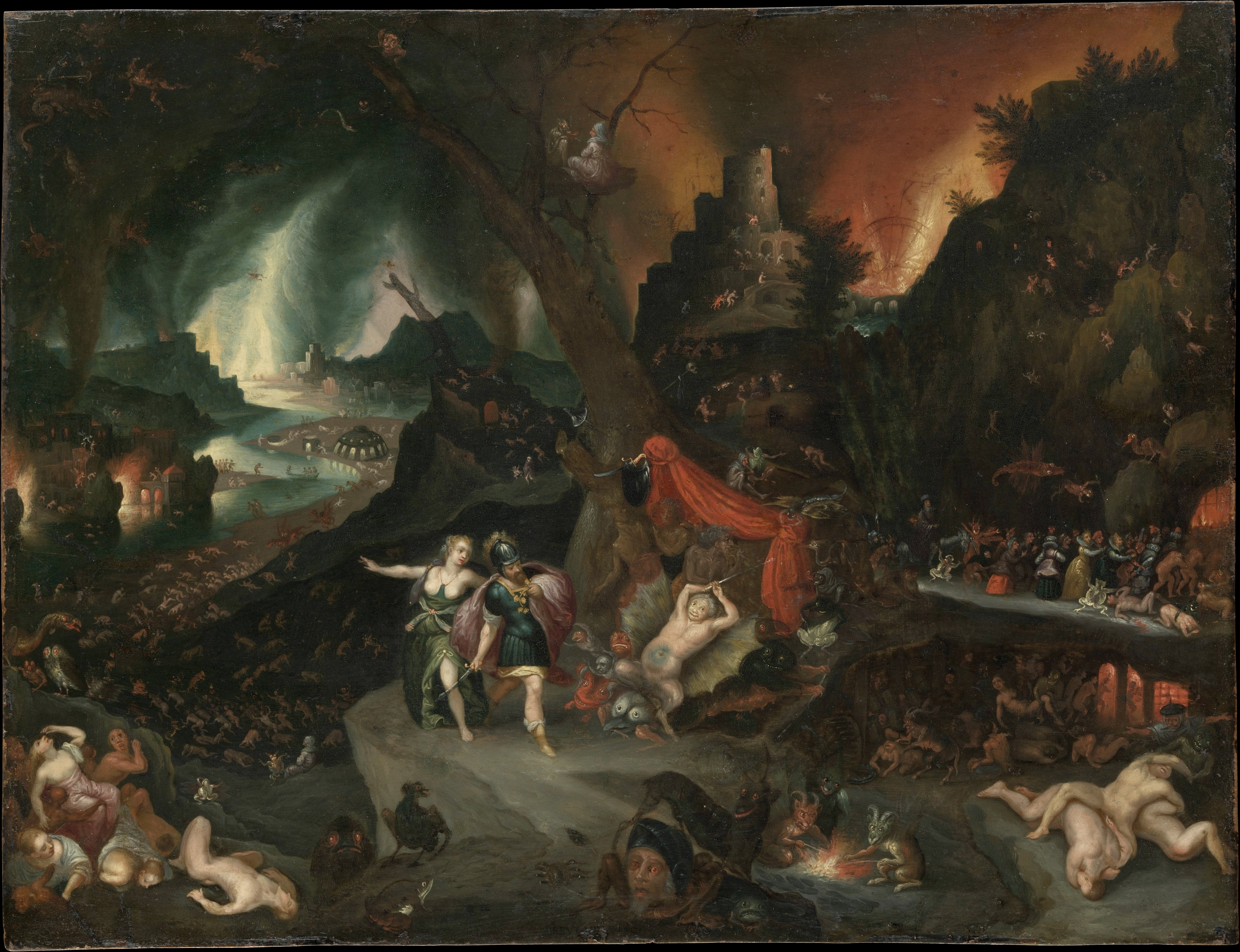
Aeneas and the Sibyl in the Underworld by Jan Brueghel the Younger.

The Fields of sorrow or Fields of mourning (Latin: Lugentes campi) are an afterlife location that is mentioned by Virgil during Aeneas' trip to the underworld. In his Aeneid, Virgil locates the fields of sorrow close to the rough waters of the river Styx and describes them as having gloomy paths and dark myrtle groves. He refers to them as a place where souls recall their earthly griefs and mourn for unfulfilled love.

== Residents ==
In the underworld, Aeneas meets the spirit of his past relationship, queen Dido of Carthage, with whom he tries to reconcile after their tragic separation. Dido doesn't respond to his calling and withdraws in the forest to her first spouse, Sichaeus. The violent ending of Dido and Aeneas' relationship, mythical founders of Carthage and Rome respectively, is used by Virgil to explain the long rivalry and wars between the two polities.

Among the souls that Aeneas meets in the fields of sorrow are several princesses and mythical figures, including Eriphyle, who is seen to bear the wounds inflicted by her son, and Phaedra, who caused the death of her love interest, Hippolytus. Other figures that are mentioned to bide in the fields are Procris, Pasiphaë, Laodamia, and Caeneus.

== See also ==
- The Golden Bough (mythology)
- Land of dreams (mythology)
- Aeneas and the Sibyl in the Underworld
