= Caeneus =

Lapith hero of Thessaly

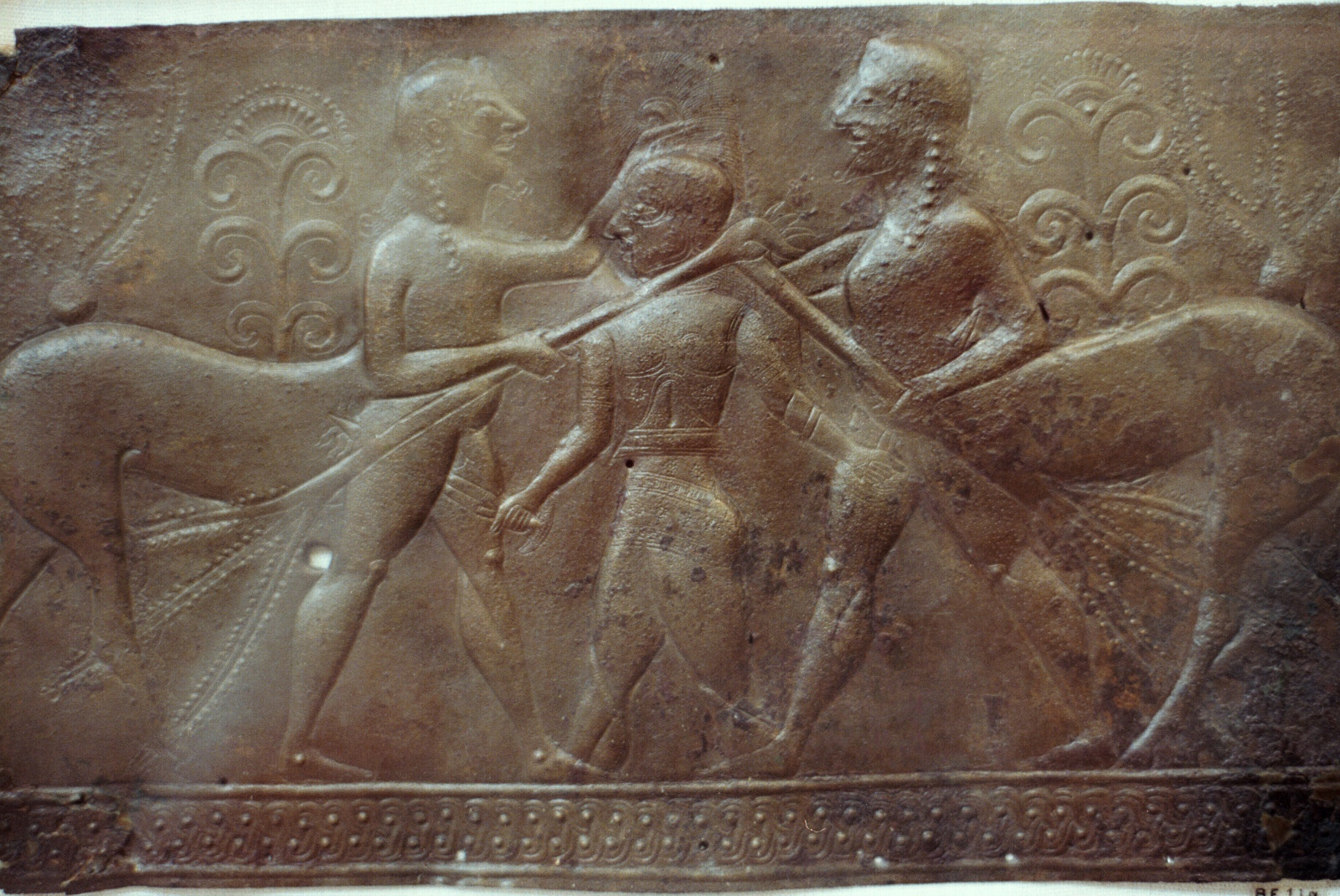
Two Centaurs pound Caeneus into the ground with tree trunks; bronze relief from Olympia, Archaeological Museum of Olympia BE 11a (mid–late seventh century BC)

In Greek mythology, Caeneus (Ancient Greek: Καινεύς, romanized: Kaineús) was a Lapith hero, ruler of Thessaly, and the father of the Argonaut Coronus. Caeneus was born a girl, Caenis (Ancient Greek: Καινίς, romanized: Kainís), the daughter of Elatus, but after Poseidon had sex with Caenis, she was transformed by him into an invulnerable man. Caeneus participated in the Centauromachy, where he met his demise at the hands of the Centaurs by being pounded into the ground while still alive.

== Family ==
Caeneus's father was the Lapith king Elatus, from Gyrton in Thessaly. Caeneus's son was the Argonaut Coronus, who was killed by Heracles while leading a war against the Dorians and their king Aegimius. According to the mythographer Hyginus, Caeneus's mother was Hippea—the daughter of a Thessalian from Larissa named Antippus—and his brothers were Ischys and the Argonaut Polyphemus. Hyginus also states that, in addition to Coronus, Caeneus had two other sons: Phocus and Priasus, who were also Argonauts. (Note: Apollodorus, 1.9.16 lists "Caeneus, son of Coronus", as one of the Argonauts, which—under the assumption that this is the same Coronus, that this is not a mixup of the two names, and does not represents a separate tradition in which Caeneus was an Argonaut—would make this Argonaut Caeneus a grandson of Caeneus.) According to Antoninus Liberalis, his father was Atrax, rather than Elatus.

== Mythology ==
=== Transformation ===
Caeneus was originally a woman named Caenis who was transformed into a man by the sea-god Poseidon. Although possibly as old as the Hesiodic Catalogue of Women (c. first half of the sixth century BC), the oldest secure mention of this transformation comes from the mythographer Acusilaus (sixth to fifth century BC). According to Acusilaus, after having sex with Poseidon, Elatus's daughter—here instead called Caene—did not want to have a child by Poseidon or anyone else, due to an unspecified vow or prohibition against it; (Note: According to Robert Fowler, the implication in Acusilaus's telling is that, because intercourse with a god would always produce a child, his transformation would prevent this. He also suggests that the prohibition was perhaps one involving intercourse in a sanctuary or with a virgin priestess.) to prevent this, Poseidon transformed Caene into an invulnerable man, stronger than any other. However, according to the usual version of events, after having sex with Caenis, Poseidon promised he would do whatever Caenis wanted, so Caenis asked to be transformed into an invulnerable man, which Poseidon did.

=== Kingship ===
Besides the Centauromachy, little is said about Caeneus's activities after his transformation. According to Acusilaus, Caeneus was the strongest warrior of his day, and became king of the Lapiths. While king, Caeneus angered the gods by an act of impiety, although accounts differ; according to an Iliad scholiast, Caeneus set up his spear in the agora and ordered his subjects to worship it, while according to a scholiast on Apollonius of Rhodes' Argonautica, Caeneus himself worshipped his spear rather than the gods. In either case, Caeneus's actions so offended the gods that, as Acusilaus goes on to say, Zeus sent the Centaurs against him. The Oxyrhynchus Papyrus that supplies Acusilaus's account says that Caeneus was used by Theophrastos as an example of ruling by the "spear" rather than the "scepter"—that is, by force rather than authority.

Caeneus was also listed as among those who took part in the Calydonian boar hunt by the sixth-century BC Greek lyric poet Stesichorus, as well as by the Roman poet Ovid and the Roman mythographer Hyginus, although no details of his participation are given.

=== Centauromachy ===
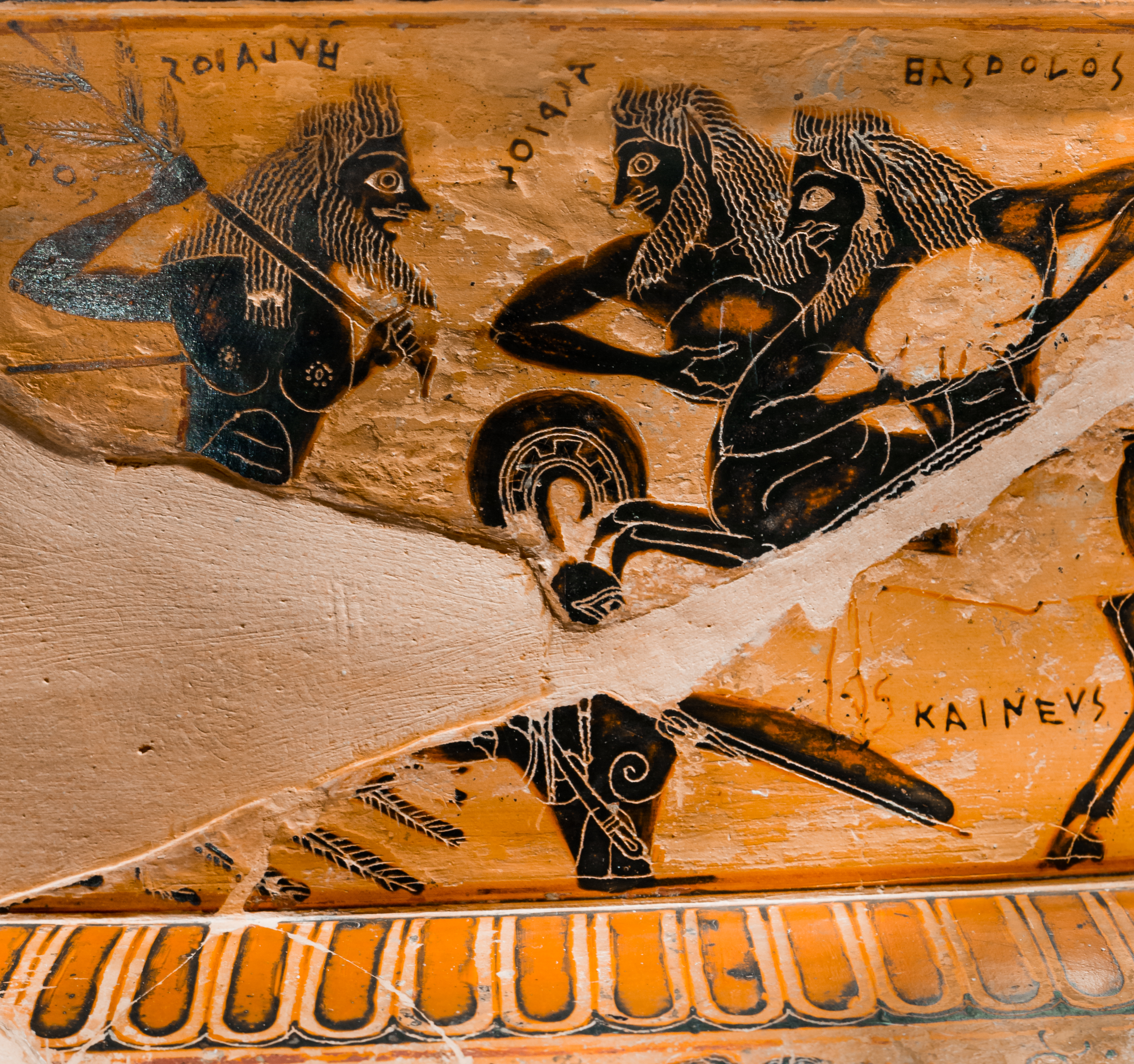
Caeneus (inscription: ΚΑΙΝΕΥΣ) already halfway into the ground, being hammered by three Centaurs, one using a tree trunk (on the left) and two using boulders (on the right); volute krater, François Vase, by Kleitias, Florence, National Archaeological Museum 4209 (c. 570–560 BC).

Caeneus's participation in the Centauromachy—the battle between the Lapiths and the Centaurs at the wedding feast of Pirithous—seems to be the earliest story told about Caeneus. His transformation and other stories are likely later elaborations.

Caeneus fought in the Centauromachy, where most accounts say he met his demise. Because of his invulnerability, none of the Centaurs' weapons could hurt him, so in order to defeat the Lapith king, they hammered him into the ground with tree trunks and boulders, which succeeded in restraining him alive.

Caeneus's earliest mention occurs in Homer's Iliad, where Nestor names Caeneus among those "mightiest" of warriors who fought and defeated the Centaurs:

Such warriors have I never since seen, or shall see, as Peirithous was, and Dryas, shepherd of men, and Caeneus, and Exadius, and godlike Polyphemus, and Theseus, son of Aegeus, peer of the immortals. Mightiest were these of all men reared on the earth; mightiest were they, and with the mightiest did they fight, with the centaurs that had their lairs among the mountains, and terribly did they destroy them.

The Hesiodic Shield of Heracles (c. first half of the sixth century BC) describes "the spear-bearing Lapiths around Caeneus their king" battling the Centaurs who fought with fir trees.

There is no mention in Homer, or the Shield, of the story of Caeneus's invulnerability, nor the unique manner of his death at the hands of the Centaurs which invulnerability entailed. However, the Centauromachy was a popular theme in Greek art, and depictions of Caeneus show that this story was well known by at least as early as the seventh century BC. Depictions of Centaurs pounding Caeneus into the ground are shown on a mid-seventh-century BC bronze relief from Olympia, and on the François Vase (c. 570–560 BC); the former shows Caeneus being pounded by two Centaurs, both using tree trunks, and the latter shows Caeneus, halfway in the ground, being pounded by three Centaurs, two using boulders and one a tree trunk.

The first preserved literary mention of Caeneus's death is found in Acusilaus, which says that Caeneus died after the Centaurs beat him "upright" (ὄρθιον) into the ground and sealed him in with a rock. The fifth-century BC Greek poet Pindar apparently also referred to Caeneus being driven vertically (ὀρθῷ ποδὶ) into the ground.

The third-century BC Argonautica of Apollonius of Rhodes, gives a fuller account, saying that Caeneus:

although still living, perished at the hands of the Centaurs, when, all alone and separated from the other heroes, he routed them. They rallied against him, but were not strong enough to push him back nor to kill him, so instead, unbroken and unbending, he sank beneath the earth, hammered by the downward force of mighty pine trees.

Concerning Caeneus's fate, Ovid has Nestor say that some thought Caeneus was pushed down directly into Tartarus, but that the seer Mopsus said that Caeneus had been transformed into a bird. According to the Orphic Argonautica, Caeneus endured his beating by the Centaurs without bending a knee, and "went down among the dead under the earth while still alive."

Hyginus listed Caeneus among those who killed themselves. According to Virgil's Aeneid, Aeneas sees the shade of Caeneus while visiting a place in the Underworld called the Lugentes campi (Mourning Fields), where those who died for love reside. Virgil locates these fields as part of, or near to, the region containing suicides. There Aeneas sees Caeneus, of whom Virgil says, although once a man, is now a woman again, "turned back by Fate into her form of old".

== Iconography ==
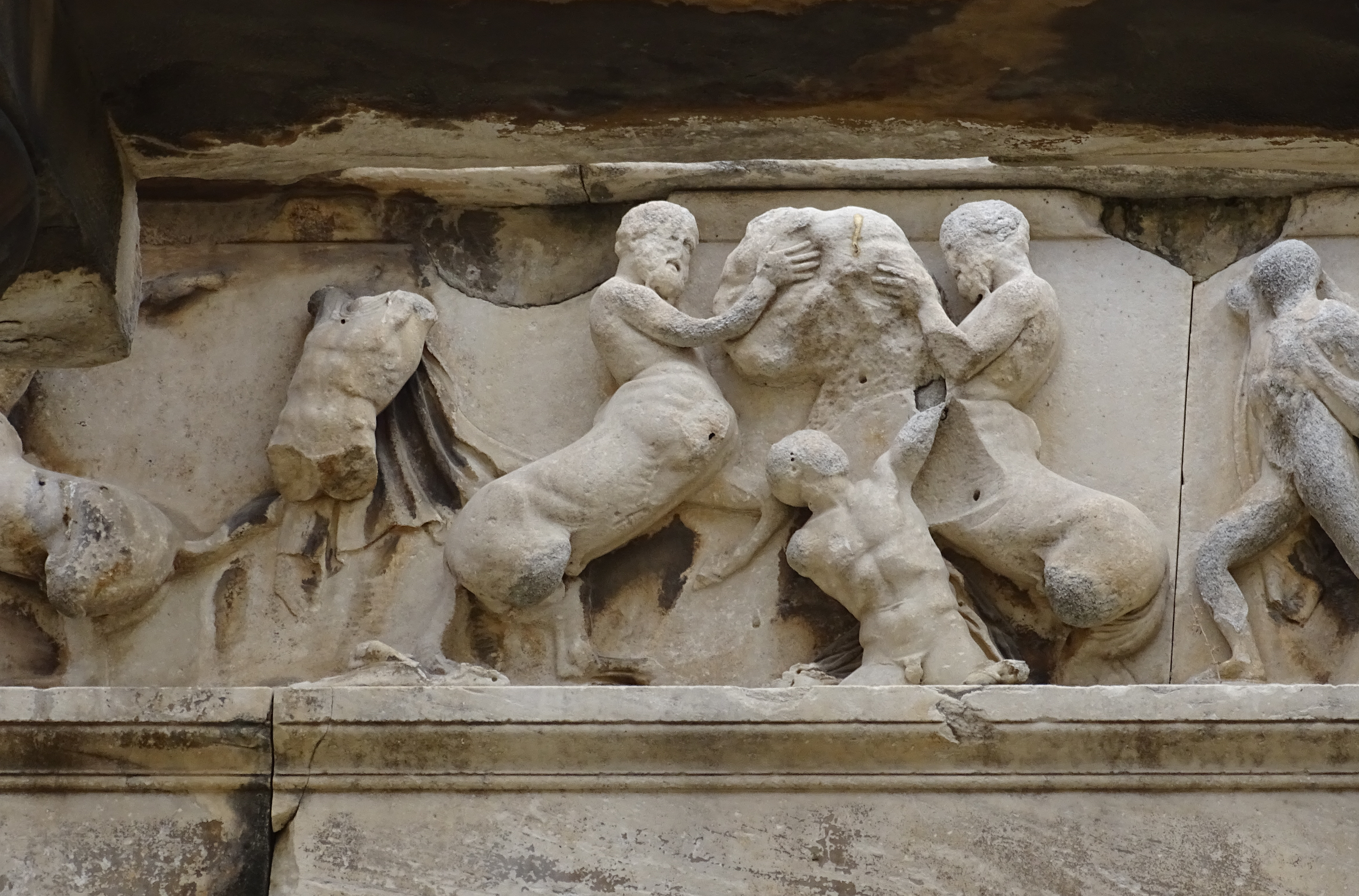
Centaurs pound Caeneus to the ground, from the frieze of the Temple of Hephaestus, second half of 5th-century BC.

Caeneus is one of the earliest mythological figures in ancient Greek art that can be securely identified. The only event concerning Caeneus found in ancient Greek iconography is his participation in the Centauromachy—no surviving example of Caeneus's original femininity and transformation is found. However, the Centauromachy was a popular theme in the visual arts, and many examples show depictions of Caeneus battling Centaurs.

The earliest depiction, from the mid–late seventh century BC, is the bronze relief from Olympia, where two Centaurs hammer Caeneus into the ground with tree trunks. He is represented as an armored hoplite, already beaten into the ground to mid-calf. In any depiction of the Centauromachy, this partially-sunken motif makes Caeneus immediately identifiable. That Caeneus is here depicted without a shield (having instead a sword in each hand) implies invulnerability. The heraldic three-figured grouping on this relief, with Caeneus flanked by two Centaurs, becomes canonical.

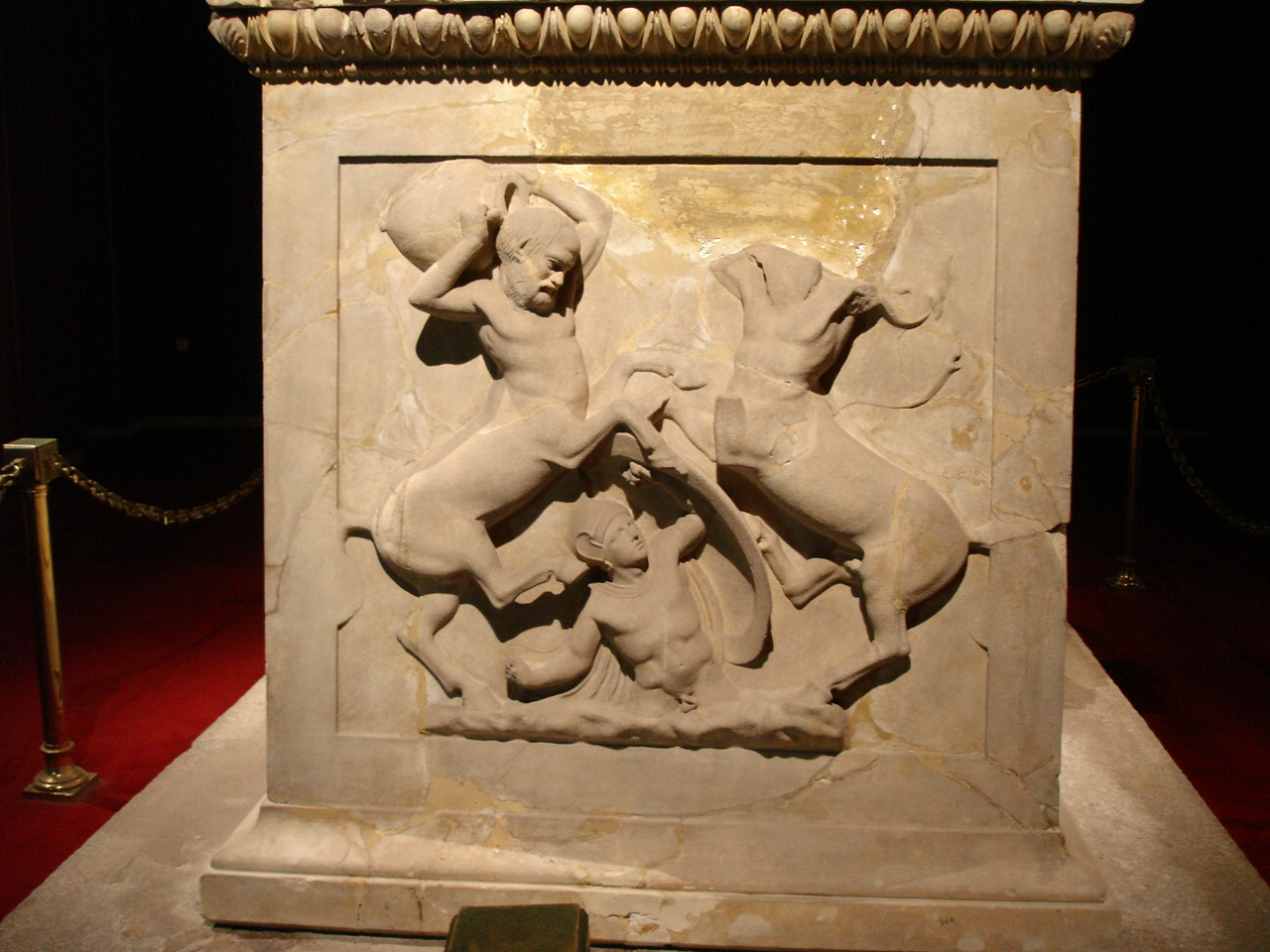
Caeneus pounded to the earth, a scene from the Lycian Sarcophagus of Sidon

Caeneus battling Centaurs is the centerpiece of the Centauromachy depicted on the neck of the mid-sixth-century BC François Vase. Here Caeneus, already buried up to his waist, is shown being pounded by three Centaurs using boulders and a tree trunk. This depiction of Caeneus is the first to identify Caeneus by inscription, and the first to introduce a third Centaur opponent. Other depictions appeared on temple friezes from the second half of the fifth century BC, including those on the Temple of Hephaestus at Athens, the Temple of Apollo Epicurius at Bassae, and the Temple of Poseidon at Sounion.

== In the Metamorphoses ==
The most detailed account of Caeneus's story is found in the Roman poet Ovid's Metamorphoses, which takes up most of book 12, and has Nestor tell Achilles the story of Caeneus's transformation, the brawl between the Centaurs and the Thessalians at Pirithous's wedding feast, and Caeneus's demise. No earlier version of the story explains why Caeneus chose to be transformed into a man; however, the Metamorphoses does. According to Ovid, Caenis was the most beautiful of maidens, but refused all of her many suitors. One day, as "report declares", while walking on the beach, she was raped by the sea-god Neptune (the Roman equivalent of Poseidon). Afterwards, when the god promised to grant her any request, Caenis chose to be made a man, so that she would never suffer being raped again:

The great wrong,
which I have suffered from you justifies
the wonderful request that I must make;
I ask that I may never suffer such
an injury again. Grant I may be
no longer woman, and I'll ask no more.

This Neptune did, transforming the girl into a man, and in addition making Caeneus "proof against all wounds of spear or sword". After this, Caeneus went away happy, spending "years in every manful exercise", while roaming the plains of northern Thessaly.

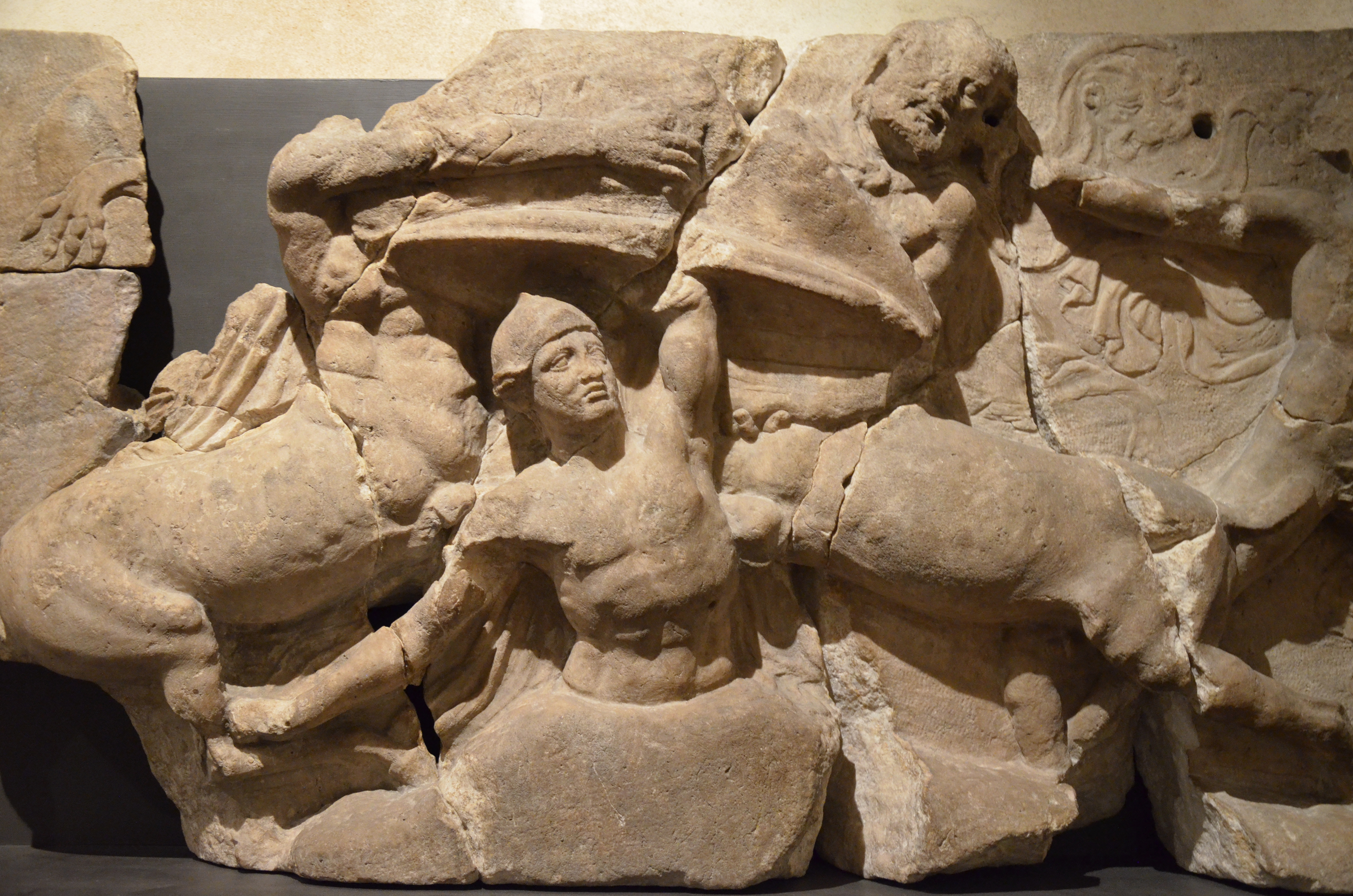
Centaurs pounding Caeneus to the earth, scene from the frieze at the Temple of Apollo Epikourios at Bassae

Nestor next describes the wedding feast of Pirithous and Hippodamia, to which the Centaurs and the "Thessalian chiefs" (including Caeneus) were invited. After a drunken Centaur tries to abduct Hippodamia, a brawl breaks out, during which Caeneus killed five Centaurs (Styphelus, Bromus, Antimachus, Elymus, and Pyracmos). Caeneus is then mocked by the Centaur Latreus who says:

Shall I put up with one like you, O Caeneus?
For you are still a woman in my sight.
Have you forgot your birth or that disgrace
by which you won reward—at what a price
you got the false resemblance to a man?!
Consider both your birth, and what you have
submitted to! Take up a distaff, and
wool basket! Twist your threads with practiced thumb!
Leave warfare to your men!

When none of their weapons could harm him, the Centaurs buried Caeneus under mountains of trees and rocks, crushing the life out of him. Nestor tells Achilles that no one knew for certain what had happened to Caeneus, and that some thought he was pushed down into Tartarus. However, when a yellow bird emerged from his burial pile, the seer Mopsus said that Caeneus had been transformed (as must happen in any Metamorphoses episode) into a bird. The story of Caeneus's metamorphosis into a bird only occurs here, and, if not an Ovidian invention, is probably a Hellenistic one.

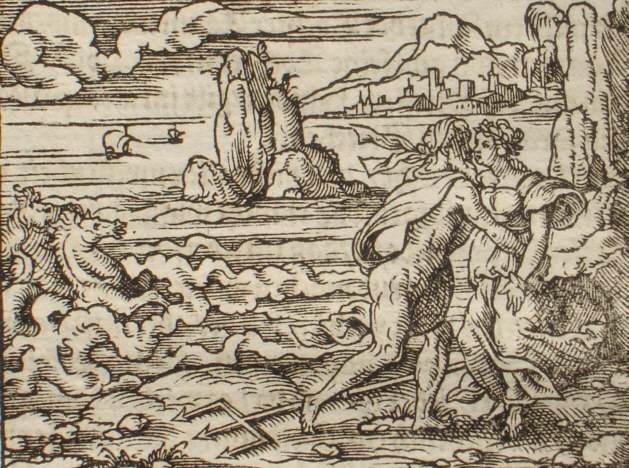
Poseidon and Caenis, woodcut illustration for Ovid's Metamorphoses book 12 by Virgil Solis, 1563.

== Bibliography ==
- Apollodorus (1921) [1st–2nd century AD]. The Library. Translated by Frazer, James George. Cambridge, Massachusetts: Harvard University Press.
- Apollonius of Rhodes (1912) [3rd century BC]. The Argonautica. Translated by Seaton, Robert Cooper. William Heinemann.
- Apollonius of Rhodes (2009) [3rd century BC]. Argonautica. Loeb Classical Library. Translated by Race, William. Cambridge, Massachusetts: Harvard University Press. ISBN 978-0-674-99630-4.
- Brunck, Richard François Philippe; Schäfer, G. H., eds. (1813). Apollonii Rhodii Argonautica. Vol. 2: Scholia Vetera in Apollonium Rhodium (2nd ed.). Fleischer.
- Campbell, David, ed. (1991). Greek Lyric. Loeb Classical Library. Vol. III: Stesichorus, Ibycus, Simonides, and Others. Cambridge, Massachusetts: Harvard University Press. ISBN 978-0674995253.
- Celoria, Francis (1992). The Metamorphoses of Antoninus Liberalis: A Translation with a Commentary. Routledge. ISBN 978-0-415-06896-3.
- Colovito, Jason (2011). The Orphic Argonautica: An English Translation. LuLu. ISBN 978-1-105-19894-6.
- Diodorus Siculus (1935). Library of History. Loeb Classical Library. Vol. II. Translated by Oldfather, Charles Henry. Cambridge, Massachusetts: Harvard University Press.
- Fowler, Robert (2000). Early Greek Mythography. Vol. I: Text and Introduction. Oxford University Press. ISBN 978-0198147404.
- Fowler, Robert (2013). Early Greek Mythography. Vol. II: Commentary. Oxford University Press. ISBN 978-0198147411.
- Freeman, Kathleen (1983). Ancilla to the Pre-Socratic Philosophers: A Complete Translation of the Fragments in Diels, Fragmente Der Vorsokratiker. Cambridge, Massachusetts: Harvard University Press. ISBN 9780674035010.
- Gantz, Timothy (1996). Early Greek Myth: A Guide to Literary and Artistic Sources. Vol. 1. Johns Hopkins University Press. ISBN 978-0-8018-5360-9.
- Griffin, Jasper (1977). "The Epic Cycle and the Uniqueness of Homer". The Journal of Hellenic Studies. 97: 39–53. doi:10.2307/631020. JSTOR 631020.
- Grimal, Pierre (1996). "Caeneus". The Dictionary of Classical Mythology. Wiley-Blackwell. p. 84. ISBN 978-0-631-20102-1.
- Hard, Robin (2004). The Routledge Handbook of Greek Mythology. Psychology Press. ISBN 978-0-41-518636-0.
- Homer (1924) [8th century BC]. The Iliad. Loeb Classical Library. Translated by Murray, Augustus Taber. Cambridge, Massachusetts: Harvard University Press.
- Hyginus (1960) [1st–2nd century AD]. Fabulae, in The Myths of Hyginus. Translated by Grant, Mary A. Lawrence, Kansas: University of Kansas Press.
- Knox, Francesca Bugliani, ed. (2023). Ronald Knox's Lectures on Virgil's Aeneid: With Introduction and Critical Essays. Bloomsbury Publishing. ISBN 978-1-3501-1830-0.
- Laufer, Erich (1990). "Kaineus". Lexicon Iconographicum Mythologiae Classicae (in German). Vol. V-1. Zurich and Munich: Artemis Verlag. ISBN 3-7608-8751-1.
- Levin, Donald (1971). Apollonius' Argonautica Re-Examined. Vol. 1. Brill.
- Lexicon Iconographicum Mythologiae Classicae. Vol. V-2. Zurich and Munich: Artemis Verlag. 1990. ISBN 3-7608-8751-1.
- Lucian. Loeb Classical Library. Vol. II. Translated by Harmon, Austin Morris. Cambridge, Massachusetts: Harvard University Press. 1915.
- Lucian. Loeb Classical Library. Vol. V. Translated by Harmon, Austin Morris. Cambridge, Massachusetts: Harvard University Press. 1936.
- Merkelbach, Reinhold; West, Martin, eds. (1967). Fragmenta Hesiodea. Oxford: Clarendon Press.
- Most, Glenn, ed. (2018a). Hesiod: Theogony, Works and Days, Testimonia. Loeb Classical Library (2nd ed.). Cambridge, Massachusetts: Harvard University Press. ISBN 978-0-674-99720-2.
- Most, Glenn, ed. (2018b). Hesiod: The Shield, Catalogue of Women, Other Fragments. Loeb Classical Library (2nd ed.). Cambridge, Massachusetts: Harvard University Press. ISBN 978-0-674-99721-9.
- "Orphic Argonautica". Argonautica, Hymni Libellus de Lapidibus et Fragmenta cum Notis (in Latin). Translated by Gesner, Johann Matthias. Leipzig: Kaspar Fritsch. 1764.
- Ovid (1922) [8 AD]. Metamorphoses. Translated by More, Brookes. Boston: Cornhill Publishing Co.
- Padgett, Michael J. (2003). The Centaur's Smile: The Human Animal in Early Greek Art. Princeton University Art Museum. ISBN 0-943012-40-6.
- Parada, Carlos (1993). Genealogical Guide to Greek Mythology. Paul Åströms Förlag. ISBN 978-91-7081-062-6.
- Pindar, Nemean Odes. Isthmian Odes. Fragments. Loeb Classical Library. Translated by Race, William. Cambridge, Massachusetts: Harvard University Press. 1997. ISBN 978-0-674-99534-5.
- Plutarch (1927) [c. 100 AD]. Moralia. Loeb Classical Library. Vol. I. Translated by Babbitt, Frank Cole. Cambridge, Massachusetts: Harvard University Press.
- Plutarch (1976) [c. 100 AD]. Moralia. Loeb Classical Library. Vol. XIII, Pt II. Translated by Cherniss, Harold. Cambridge, Massachusetts: Harvard University Press. ISBN 978-0-674-99517-8.
- Rose, Herbert Jennings (2012). "Caeneus". In Hornblower, Simon; Spawforth, Antony; Eidinow, Esther (eds.). The Oxford Classical Dictionary (4th ed.). Oxford University Press. p. 261. ISBN 978-0-19-954556-8.
- Slater, William J. (1969). "ὀρθός". Lexicon to Pindar. Berlin: De Gruyter.
- Snell, Bruno; Maehler, Herwig, eds. (1989). Pindari Carmina cum Fragmentis. Vol. II. Leipzig: Bibliotheca Teubneriana.
- Thiel, Helmut van, ed. (2014). Scholia D in Iliadem (PDF). Cologne: University of Cologne. ISBN 978-3-931596-83-5.
- Toye, David (2020). "Akousilaos of Argos (2)". In Worthington, Ian (ed.). Brill's New Jacoby (2nd ed.). Leiden: Brill.
- Tripp, Edward (1970). Crowell's Handbook of Classical Mythology (1st ed.). Thomas Y. Crowell Co. ISBN 069022608X.
- Virgil (1999) [19 BC]. "Aeneid". Eclogues, Georgics, Aeneid: Books 1-6. Loeb Classical Library. Translated by Fairclough, H. Rushton; Goold, G. P. Cambridge, Massachusetts: Harvard University Press. ISBN 978-0-674-99583-3.
- Visser, Edzard (2003). "Caeneus". In Cancik, Hubert; Schneider, Helmuth; Salazar, Christine (eds.). Brill's New Pauly: Encyclopaedia of the Ancient World — Antiquity. Vol. 2. Brill. p. 895. ISBN 90-04-12265-6.
