= Gyrton =

Gyrton (ancient Greek: Γύρτων) may refer to:

- Gyrton (mythology)
- Gyrton (Thessaly), an ancient city

== See also ==
- Gyrtona
