= Alyzia =

Alyzia Αλυζία
- Municipal unit
- Location within the regional unit

- Location within Greece
- Coordinates: 38°42′N 20°56′E
- Country: Greece
- Administrative region: West Greece
- Regional unit: Aetolia-Acarnania
- Municipality: Xiromero
- Districts: 5

Area
  - Municipal unit: 148.719 km^{2} (57.421 sq mi)

Population (2021)
  - Municipal unit: 2,675
  - Municipal unit density: 17.99/km^{2} (46.59/sq mi)
- Time zone: UTC+2 (EET)
  - Summer (DST): UTC+3 (EEST)
- Postal code: 300 19
- Area code: 26460

Alyzia (Greek: Αλυζία) is a former municipality in Aetolia-Acarnania, West Greece, Greece. Since the 2011 local government reform it is part of the municipality Xiromero, of which it is a municipal unit. It is located on the central west coast of Aetolia-Acarnania, near the Greek island of Kalamos. It has a land area of 148.719 km² and a population of 2,675 inhabitants at the 2021 census. Its municipal seat was the town of Kandila.

== Subdivisions ==
The municipal unit Alyzia is subdivided into the following communities (constituent villages in brackets):

- Kandila
- Archontochori (Archontochori, Agios Athanasios, Paliovarka)
- Mytikas
- Panagoula
- Varnakas

== History ==
Ancient Alyzia was one of the most important cities of ancient Acarnania. According to Strabo, the city was named after Alyzeus, son of Icarius and brother of Penelope (Odysseus' wife).

Famous natives include the regent of Ptolemaic Egypt, Aristomenes of Alyzia (fl. 190s BC).
