= Pereus =

Prince of Arcadia in Greek mythology

In Greek mythology, Pereus (Ancient Greek: Περέος) was an Arcadian prince as the son of King Elatus and Laodice, daughter of King Cinyras. He had four brothers namely, Stymphalus, Aepytus, Ischys and Cyllen. Pereus had a daughter, Neaera who married Autolycus, a son of Hermes.
