= Meda (mythology) =

In Greek mythology, the name Meda (Ancient Greek: Μήδα) or Mede (Μέδη or Μήδη) may refer to:

- Meda, wife of King Idomeneus. While her husband fought at Troy, she had a love affair with Leucus (like Clytaemnestra and Aegiale, she became unfaithful to her husband at the instigation of Nauplius). However, Leucus eventually killed Meda and her daughter Cleisithyra, and seized the power over the kingdom of Idomeneus.
- Meda, daughter of Phylas and mother of Antiochus by Heracles.
- Mede, another name for Iphthime, daughter of Icarius of Sparta and Asterodia, daughter of Eurypylus. She was the sister of Penelope, Amasichus, Phalereus, Thoon, Pheremmelias, Perilaos. Mede was also called Hypsipyle, Laodamia and Laodice.
