= Stymphalus (son of Elatus) =

Mythological king of Arcadia

In Greek mythology, Stymphalus or Stymphalos (Ancient Greek: Στύμφαλος) was a king of Arcadia. He was the eponym of the town Stymphalus (now Stymfalia) and of a spring near it.

== Family ==
Stymphalus was one of the sons of Elatus and Laodice, alongside Pereus, Aepytus, Ischys and Cyllen. Stymphalus' sons were Agamedes, Gortys and Agelaus, the father of Phalanthus. Stymphalus also had a daughter, Parthenope, the mother of Everes by Heracles.

== Mythology ==
Stymphalus was treacherously killed by Pelops, who, being unable to defeat him at war, pretended to establish friendship with him, only to approach and slay the inadvertent Stymphalus; he then chopped off his limbs and scattered them around. As punishment for Pelops' crime, the gods had Greece suffer from infertility until the pious Aeacus was asked to pray for relief of the calamity.

According to a scholion on Apollonius of Rhodes' Argonautica, the Greek historian Mnaseas considered a Stymphalus and a woman Ornis (literally "bird") to be the parents of a set of daughters, the Stymphalides, who were killed by Heracles over the fact that they denied him hospitality but received the Molionidae.
