= Kandila =

Kandila or Kandyla may refer to several villages in Greece:

- Kandila, Aetolia-Acarnania
- Kandila, Arcadia
