= Cleitor (mythology) =

Several figures in Greek mythology

In Greek mythology, Cleitor or Clitor (Ancient Greek: Κλείτωρ) or Kleitor (Κλήτωρ) may refer to the following personages:

- Cleitor, an Arcadian prince as one of the 50 sons of the impious King Lycaon either by the naiad Cyllene, or by Nonacris. He and his brothers were the most nefarious and carefree of all people. To test them, Zeus visited them in the form of a peasant. These brothers mixed the entrails of a child into the god's meal, whereupon the enraged Zeus threw the meal over the table. Cleitor was killed, along with his brothers and their father, by a lightning bolt of the god.
- Cleitor, Cletor or Cleitos, the father of Eurymedousa, mother of Myrmidon by Zeus.
- Cleitor, in his time, the most powerful of the kings in Arcadia. He was the son of King Azan of Azania but he was childless, therefore he was succeeded by his own cousin, Aepytus, the son of Elatus. Cleitor dwelt in Lycosura and founded a town that bears its name (Cleitor).
