= Triphylus =

In Greek mythology, Triphylus (Ancient Greek: Τρίφυλος means "of three tribes") was an Arcadian prince as the son of King Arcas and Laodamia (Leanira), daughter of King Amyclas of Sparta. Triphylus' possible brothers were Elatus and Apheidas, and his son was Erasus.
