= 1011 Laodamia =

Mars-crossing asteroid

Discovery
- Discovered by: K. Reinmuth
- Discovery site: Heidelberg Obs.
- Discovery date: 5 January 1924

Designations
- Pronunciation: /ˌleɪ.oʊdəˈmaɪə/
- Named after: Λαοδάμεια Lāodamīa (Greek mythology)
- Alternative designations: 1924 PK · 1939 FG; 1958 OC
- Minor planet category: Mars crosser

Orbital characteristics
- Epoch 4 September 2017 (JD 2458000.5)
- Uncertainty parameter 0
- Observation arc: 93.50 yr (34,150 days)
- Aphelion: 3.2315 AU
- Perihelion: 1.5535 AU
- Semi-major axis: 2.3925 AU
- Eccentricity: 0.3507
- Orbital period (sidereal): 3.70 yr (1,352 days)
- Mean anomaly: 88.023°
- Mean motion: 0° 15^{m} 58.68^{s} / day
- Inclination: 5.4939°
- Longitude of ascending node: 132.53°
- Argument of perihelion: 353.34°

Physical characteristics
- Dimensions: 7.39 km (derived); 7.56±0.76 km
- Synodic rotation period: 5.17 h 5.17247±0.00007 h 5.175±0.005 h (Note: Apostolovska (2011): rotation period 5.175 hours with a brightness amplitude of 0.41 mag and a Quality Code of 2+. Summary figures for (1011) Laodamia at Collaborative Asteroid Lightcurve Link (CALL))
- Geometric albedo: 0.248±0.050; 0.259
- Spectral type: Tholen = S · S SMASS = Sr; B–V = 0.900; U–B = 0.515; V–R = 0.324±0.171
- Absolute magnitude (H): 12.00 · 12.416±0.171 · 12.74 · 13.09±0.23

Laodamia (minor planet designation: 1011 Laodamia), provisional designation 1924 PK, is a stony asteroid and sizable Mars-crosser near the innermost regions of the asteroid belt, approximately 7.5 kilometers in diameter. It was discovered on 5 January 1924, by German astronomer Karl Reinmuth at the Heidelberg-Königstuhl State Observatory in southwest Germany. The asteroid was named after Laodamia from Greek mythology.

== Orbit and classification ==
Laodamia is a Mars-crossing asteroid, a dynamically unstable group between the main belt and the near-Earth populations, crossing the orbit of Mars at 1.666 AU. It orbits the Sun at a distance of 1.6–3.2 AU once every 3 years and 8 months (1,352 days). Its orbit has an eccentricity of 0.35 and an inclination of 5° with respect to the ecliptic.

The body's observation arc begins 15 years after its official discovery observation with its identification 1939 FG at Turku Observatory in March 1939. On 5 September 2083, it will pass 0.06186 AU (9,254,000 km; 5,750,000 mi) from Mars.

== Physical characteristics ==
In the Tholen classification, Laodamia is a stony S-type asteroid, while in the SMASS taxonomy, it is a transitional type between the stony S-type and rare R-type asteroids.

=== Rotation period and spin axis ===
In March 2002, a rotational lightcurve of Laodamia was obtained from photometric observations by French amateur astronomers Laurent Bernasconi and Silvano Casulli. Lightcurve analysis gave a well-defined rotation period of 5.17247 hours with a brightness amplitude of 0.44 magnitude (U=3). Two other lightcurve gave a concurring period of 5.17 and 5.175 hours, respectively (U=2+/3).

Photometry taken at the Rozhen Observatory over a period of more than a decade allowed to model the asteroid's shape and gave two spin axis of (95.0°, −85.5°) and (272.0°, −88.0°) in ecliptic coordinates (λ, β) (U=n.a.).

=== Diameter and albedo ===
According to the survey carried out by NASA's Wide-field Infrared Survey Explorer and its subsequent NEOWISE mission, Laodamia measures 7.56 kilometers in diameter and its surface has an albedo of 0.248, while the Collaborative Asteroid Lightcurve Link adopts an albedo of 0.259 and derives a diameter of 7.39 kilometers based on an absolute magnitude of 12.74.

This makes Laodamia one of the largest mid-sized Mars-crossing asteroids comparable with 1065 Amundsenia (9.75 km), 1139 Atami (9.35 km), 1474 Beira (14.9 km), 1727 Mette (5.44 km), 1131 Porzia (7.13 km), 1235 Schorria (5.55 km), 985 Rosina (8.18 km), 1310 Villigera (15.24 km) and 1468 Zomba (7 km), but far smaller than the largest members of this dynamical group, namely, 132 Aethra, 323 Brucia, 1508 Kemi, 2204 Lyyli and 512 Taurinensis, which are all larger than 20 kilometers in diameter.

== Naming ==
This minor planet was named after Laodamia from Greek mythology. The asteroid's name was proposed by Russian astronomer Nikolaj Vasil'evich Komendantov (RI 740), see (3958).

The name either refers to the daughter of Akastos, who was the wife of Protesilaos, see (3540), and killed in the Trojan War, as narrated by Euripides, see (2930). It may also refer to the daughter of Bellerophon, see (1808) and the wife of Sarpedon, see (2223). She was killed by the arrows of Artemis, see (105). (Source of name researched by the author of the Dictionary of Minor Planet Names, Lutz D. Schmadel).
