= Damasiclus =

In Greek mythology, Damasiclus (Ancient Greek: Δαμάσικλος or Δαμασίκλου) also called Amasiclus (᾿Αμάσικλος) or Amasichus (᾿Αμάσιχος), the Spartan son of Icarius and Asterodia, and brother of Polymelos, Penelope and Laodice; or Phalereus, Thoon, Pheremmelias, Perilaos, Penelope and Laodamia (also called Mede or Hypsipyle). Damasiclus might be identical with Damasippus who was also called the son of Icarius (by the naiad Periboea) and brother of Penelope. He fathered Erymede, mother of Taenarus by her uncle Elatus, another son of Icarius.

== Reference ==
- Apollodorus, The Library with an English Translation by Sir James George Frazer, F.B.A., F.R.S. in 2 Volumes, Cambridge, MA, Harvard University Press; London, William Heinemann Ltd. 1921. ISBN 0-674-99135-4. Online version at the Perseus Digital Library. Greek text available from the same website.
