= Perileos =

Name of characters from Greek mythology

In Greek mythology, Perileos (/pəˈrɪliɒs/; Ancient Greek: Περίλεως) or Perilaus (/ˌpɛrɪˈleɪəs/; Περίλᾱος) is a name that may refer to:

- Perileos, is the Spartan son of Icarius and the naiad Periboea, he was the brother of Penelope, Thoas, Damasippus, Imeusimus, Aletes and probably Iphthime. In one account, he was called Perilaos and his mother was named Asterodia, daughter of Eurypylus; and brother of Amasichus, Phalereus, Thoon, Pheremmelias, Penelope and Laodamia (also called Mede or Hypsipyle - the alternate names of Iphthime).
- Perileos accused Orestes of the murder of his cousin Clytemnestra.
- Perileos, son of Ancaeus of Samos and Samia, daughter of the river god Maeander. His siblings were Enoudus, Samus, Alitherses and Parthenope (mother of Lycomedes by Apollo).
- Perileos, a defender of Troy killed by Neoptolemus.
- Perilaus, alleged inventor of the brazen bull.
