= Geraestus (mythology) =

In Greek mythology, Geraestus or Geraistos (Ancient Greek: Γεραιστός) may refer to two personages:

- Geraestus, son of Zeus and brother of Taenarus and Calabrus. The three brothers were said to have sailed to Peloponnese and to have seized a portion of land there.
- Geraestus, a Cyclops on whose grave in Attica Hyacinthus of Lacedaemon had his daughters Aegleis, Antheis, Lytaea, and Orthaea were sacrificed.
