= Laodice (mythology) =

In Greek mythology, Laodice (/leɪˈɒdəˌsi/, [la.odíkɛː]; Ancient Greek: Λαοδίκη, romanized: Laodíkē, lit. 'justice of the people') may refer to the following figures:

- Laodice, one of the Hyperborean maidens. Together with her sister, Hyperoche, Laodice was buried after her death on the temple grounds of Apollo, where their grave was worshiped by the residents.
- Laodice, daughter of Aloeus, wife of Aeolus and mother of Salmoneus and Cretheus.
- Laodice, daughter of King Priam and a princess of Troy
- Laodice, daughter of Agamemnon and Clytaemnestra, sometimes conflated with Electra.
- Laodice, daughter of King Cinyras of Cyprus and Metharme. She was the wife of Elatus and by him mother of Stymphalus and Pereus, and possibly of Ischys, Cyllen and Aepytus too.
- Laodice, descendant of Agapenor, who was known for having sent to Tegea a robe as a gift to Athena Alea, and to have built a temple of Aphrodite Paphia in Tegea.
- Laodice, alternate name for Iphthime, daughter of Icarius of Sparta and Asterodia, daughter of Eurypylus. She was the sister of Polymelos, Damasiclus (Amasiclus) and Penelope. Laodice was also called Laodamia, Mede and Hypsipyle.
- Laodice, daughter of Iphis and mother of Capaneus.
- Laodice, a golden-haired lover of Poseidon.
- Laodice, daughter of Cycnus and war-prize of Odysseus. In the Iliad, Agamemnon threatens to take her when he is forced to return his own slave, Chryseis.
