= Alyzeia =

Ancient Greek town in Acarnania

Coordinates: 38°42′34″N 20°57′08″E

Alyzeia (Ancient Greek: Ἀλύζεια) or Alyzia (Ἀλυζια), was a town on the west coast of ancient Acarnania. According to Strabo it was distant 15 stadia from the sea, on which it possessed a harbour and a sanctuary, both dedicated to Heracles. In this sanctuary were some works of art by Lysippus, representing the Labours of Heracles, which a Roman general caused to be removed to Rome on account of the deserted state of the place. The remains of Alyzia are still visible in the valley of Kandila. The distance of the bay of Kandila from the ruins to Leucas corresponds with the 120 stadia which Cicero assigns for the distance between Alyzia and Leucas. Alyzia is said to have derived its name from Alyzeus, a son of Icarius. It is first mentioned by Thucydides; in 375 BCE, a naval battle was fought in the neighbourhood of Alyzia between the Athenians under Timotheus and the Lacedaemonians under Nicolochus. The Athenians, says Xenophon, erected their trophy at Alyzia, and the Lacedaemonians in the nearest islands. According to the Periplus of Pseudo-Scylax that the island immediately opposite Alyzia was called Carnus, the modern Kalamos.

Epirus in antiquity

Its site is located near the modern Kandila, Xiromero.

== See also ==
- List of cities in ancient Acarnania
