= Polymelus (mythology) =

Greek mythological figures

In Greek mythology, Polymelus (Ancient Greek: Πολύμηλον or Πολύμηλος, romanized: Polymēlos, lit. 'with many sheep' or 'abounding in sheep') may refer to multiple figures:

- Polymelos, suitor of Megara, mother of Ixion in one source. Together with another suitor, Phorbas, they slain Megara and, in vengeance, were murdered by the latter's son.
- Polymelos, son of Icarius and Asterodia, daughter of Eurypylus. He was the brother of Damasiclus (Amasiclus), Penelope and Laodice (Iphthime).
- Polymelus, a Lycian warrior, son of Argeas. He was killed by Patroclus.
- Polymelus, a Trojan prince as an illegitimate son of King Priam by one of his concubines.
