= Coronis (lover of Apollo) =

Ancient Greek princess of Thessaly

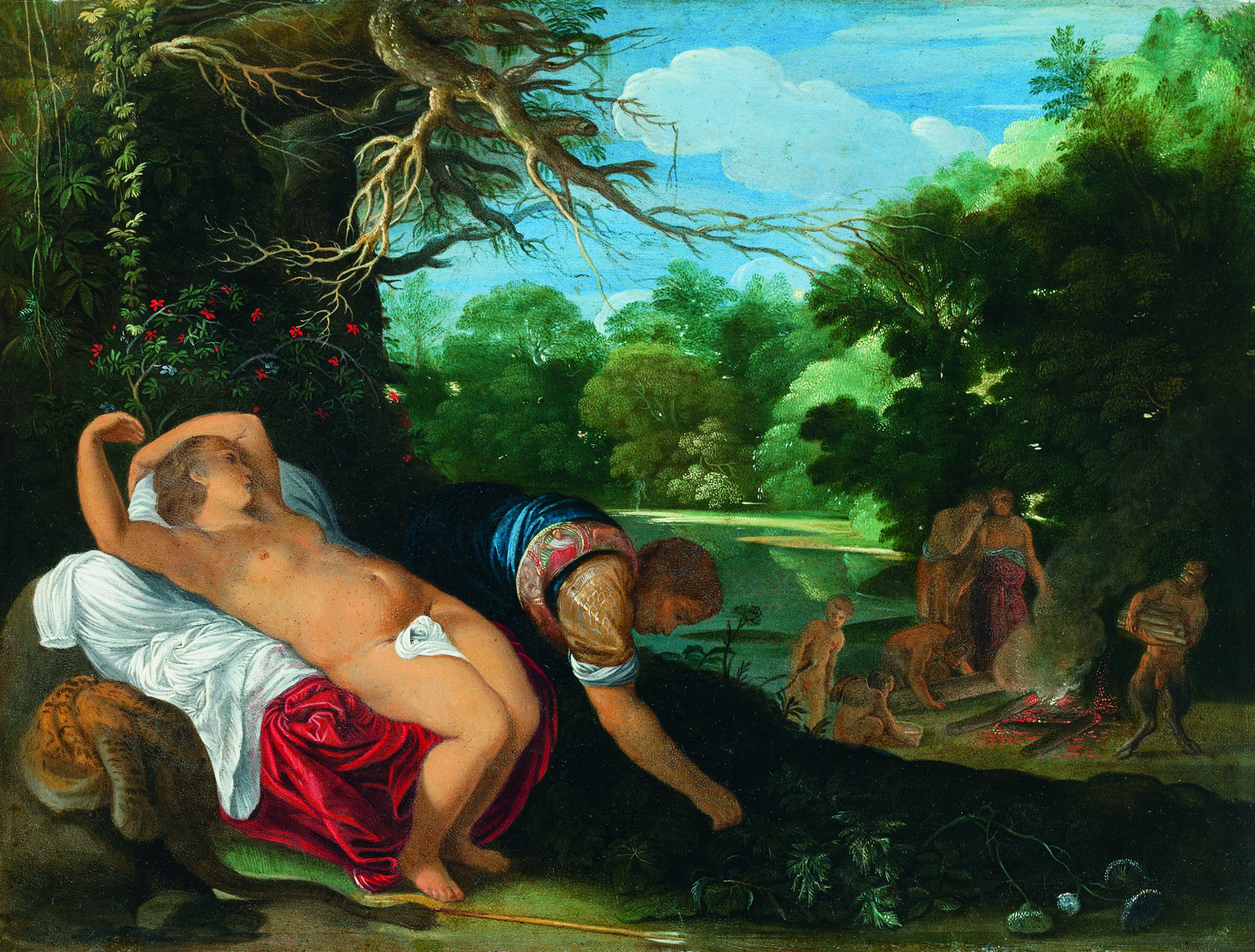
- Apollo and Coronis by Johann König (after Adam Elsheimer).

In-universe information
- Aliases: Arsinoe, Aegle
- Gender: Female
- Title: Princess
- Significant others: Apollo, Ischys
- Children: Asclepius (son)
- Relatives: Phlegyas (father); Cleophema (mother); Ixion (brother)
- Birthplace: Ancient Thessaly

In Greek mythology, Coronis (/kɒˈrəʊnɪs/; Ancient Greek: Κορωνίς, romanized: Korōnís) is a Thessalian princess and a lover of the god Apollo. She was the daughter of Cleophema and Phlegyas, king of the Lapiths. By Apollo she became the mother of Asclepius, the Greek god of medicine. While she was still pregnant, she slept with a mortal man named Ischys and was subsequently killed by either the god or his sister Artemis for her betrayal. After failing to heal her, Apollo rescued their unborn child by performing a caesarean section. She was turned into a constellation after her death.

== Etymology ==
In Ancient Greek Κορωνίς means "curved, bent" and has the same root as the word κορώνη (korṓnē), meaning, among other things, "crow," due to the curvature of its beak.

== Family ==
Zeus gave the hand of the Muse Erato to Malus. The pair had a daughter Cleophema, who married Phlegyas, the king of Lapiths. Their daughter was called Aegle, otherwise known as Coronis. In some other accounts, her father was Azan, king of Arcadia.

== Mythology ==
=== Apollo ===
==== Unfaithful lover ====
One day Apollo saw Coronis and became enamoured of her. He lay with her in her home, and consequently she became pregnant. One time when Apollo was away performing his godly duties, Coronis fell in love with Ischys, son of Elatus. Going against her father's warnings, she slept with him in secret. Apollo, however, discovered this affair through his prophetic powers. Angered, he sent his twin sister, Artemis, to kill Coronis. Accordingly, Artemis killed Coronis and her family with her arrows. In one variation, Artemis kills them on her own accord to avenge the insult done to her brother. Likewise, Ischys was killed by Zeus.

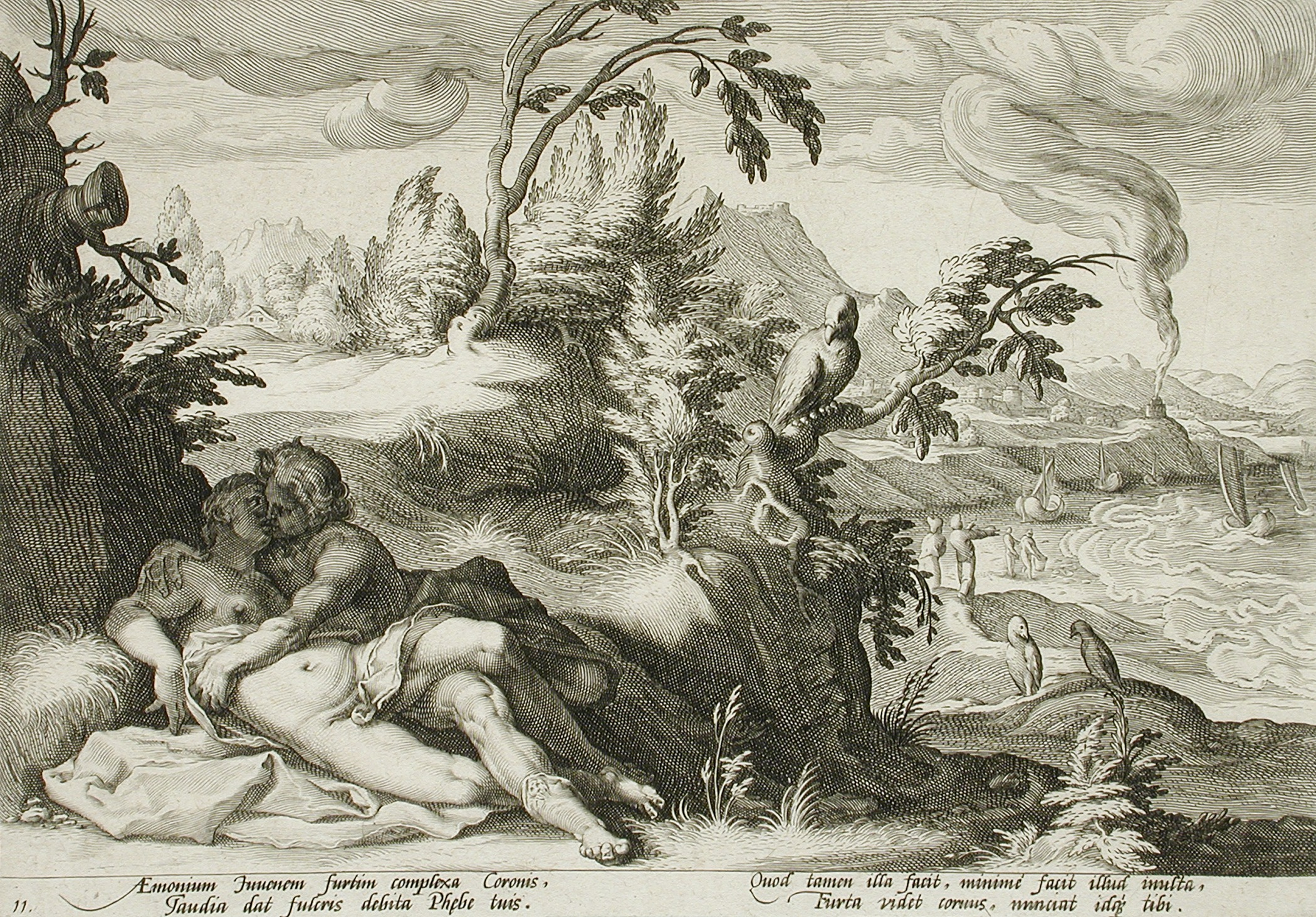
Apollo and Coronis by Hendrik Goltzius

In Ovid's poem, it is a raven that informed Apollo of the affair, and he killed Coronis with his own arrow. Before her death, Coronis was resigned to her fate. Apollo instantly regretted his impulsive action and tried to heal her, but Coronis was already dead. He then placed her body on the pyre and poured myrrh and other sweet fragrances on it as a part of the funerary rites. Hyginus also has Coronis's death be at the hands of Apollo.

Not wanting his unborn child to suffer as well, Apollo cut Coronis's belly open when she was laid on her funeral pyre, and rescued the child by pulling it out. He named the child Asclepius and reared him for some time, teaching him about medicinal herbs. Others say that it was Hermes instead who saved the infant from the flames. Later, Apollo entrusted his son to Chiron, the wise centaur, who trained him more in medicine and hunting.

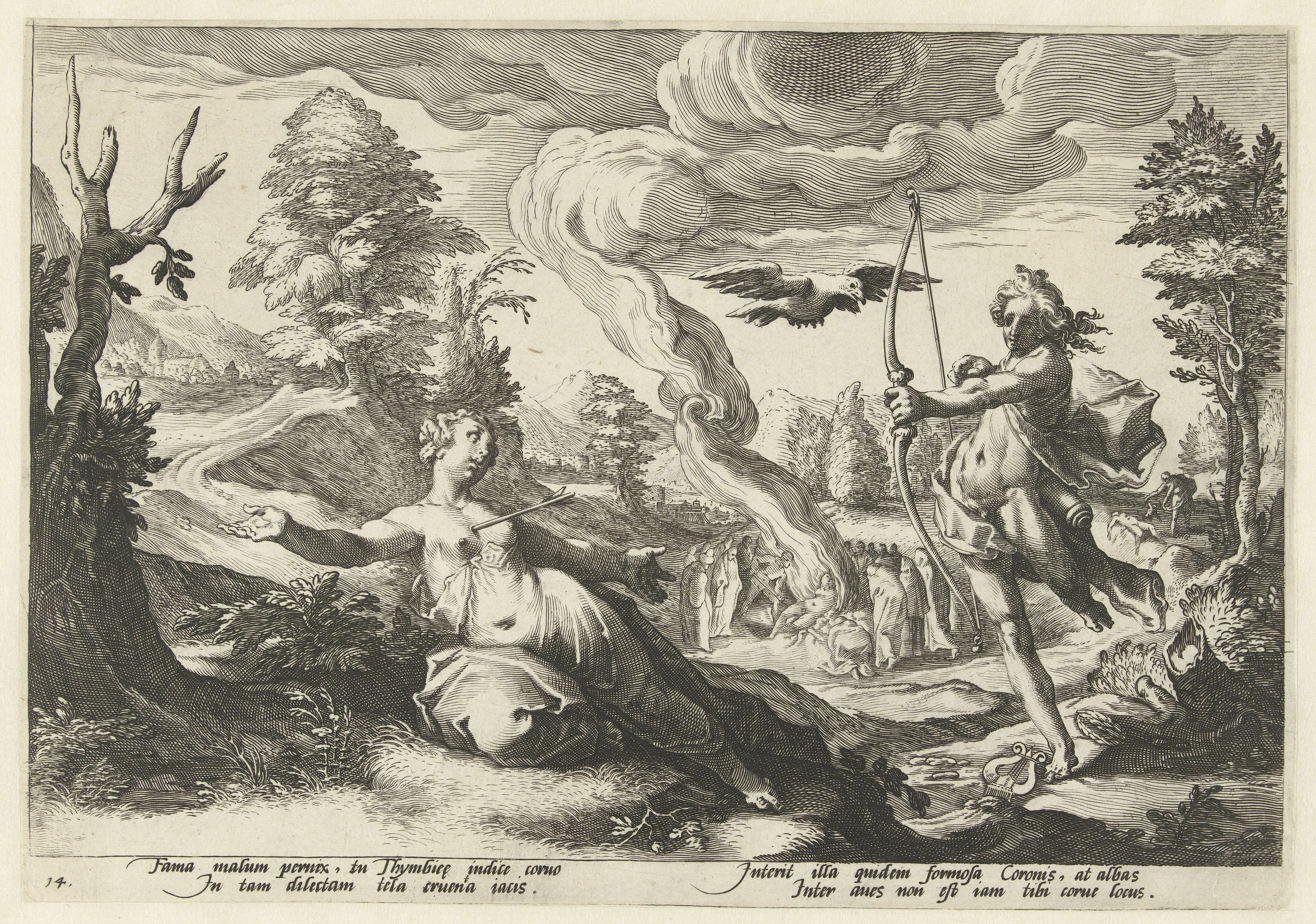
Apollo kills Coronis, 1590 engraving by Hendrick Goltzius.

==== Other variations ====
According to a different version, Coronis gave birth to her son in Apollo's temple in the presence of the Moirai. Lachesis acted as the midwife. Apollo named their son Asclepius after his mother's alias, Aegle.

In yet another version, Coronis who was already impregnated by Apollo, had to accompany her father to the Peloponnesus. She had kept her pregnancy hidden from her father. In Epidaurus, she bore a son and exposed him on a mountain. The child was given milk by one of the goats that pastured about the mountain, and was guarded by the watch-dog of the herd. Aresthanas, the owner of goats and the guard dogs, found the child. As he came near, he saw lightning that flashed from the child, and thinking of it to be a sign of divine, he left the child alone. Asclepius was later taken by Apollo.

=== The raven and constellation Corvus ===
According to Ovid, when Coronis was pregnant, Apollo had appointed a white raven to guard her before leaving. The raven, after learning the affair of Coronis with Ischys, reported it to Apollo. Apollo sent Artemis to kill the couple and in anger, turned the raven black by scorching it as a punishment for being a tattletale and failing its duty. This is given as the reason why ravens are black today. According to Antoninus Liberalis, the raven had once been a man named Lycius, a son of Clinis, who sacrificed donkeys to Apollo despite the god's prohibition; Apollo then turned the donkeys mad, so they attacked and began devouring the entire family. They prayed to the gods for help, and Apollo turned Lycius into a raven while Artemis and Leto saved the rest. Furthermore, Antoninus Liberalis calls the man Coronis left Apollo for "Alcyoneus" rather than Ischys.

Istrus (Greek historian) and several others said that Coronis was turned into the constellation Corvus.

== See also ==
- Cassandra
- Procris
- Cyparissus
- Ocyrhoe
