= Phlegyas =

Ancient Greek mythological king

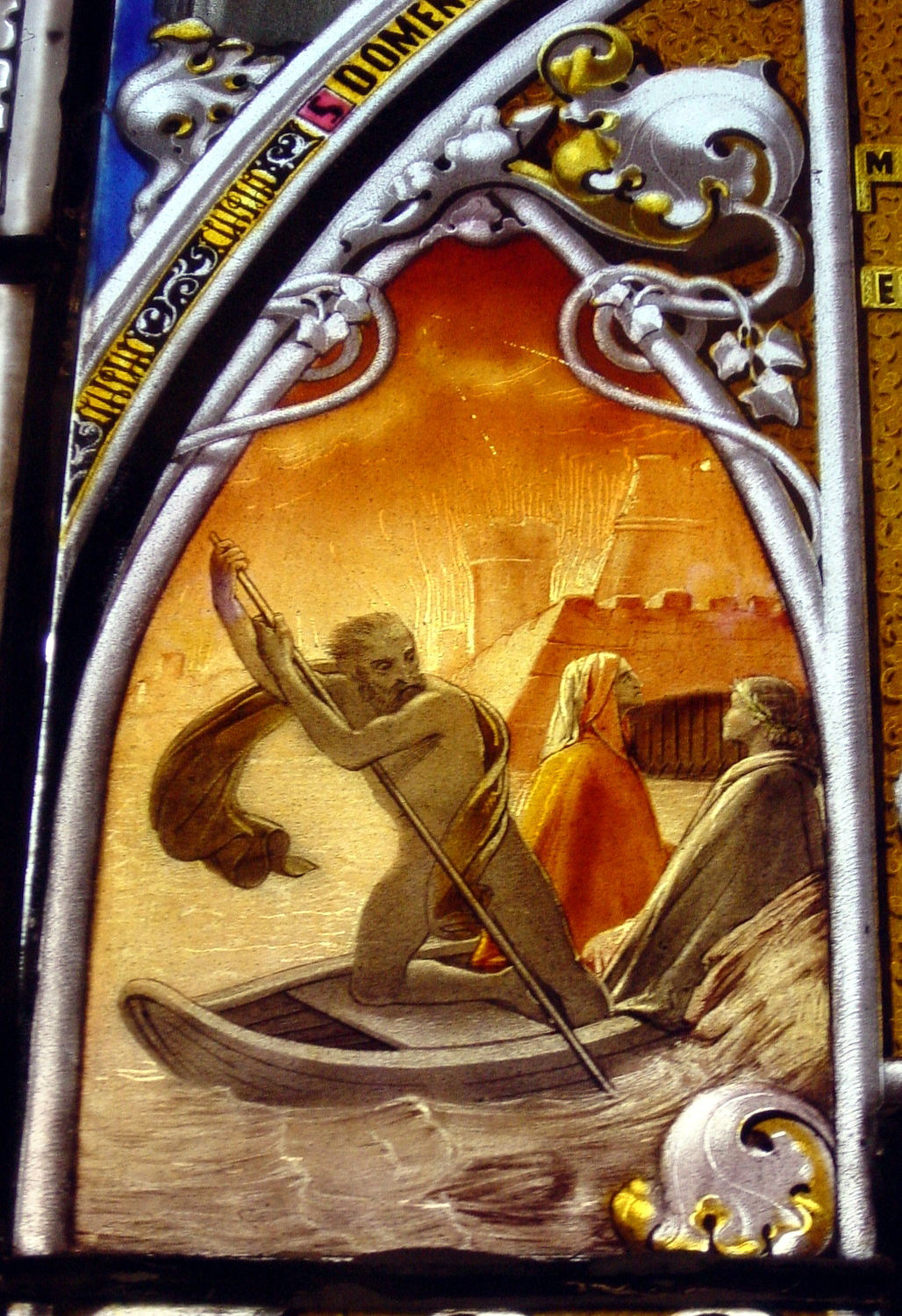
Phlegias with Dante and Virgil, stained glass in Museo Poldi Pezzoli in Milan

In Greek mythology, Phlegyas (/ˈflɛdʒiəs/; Ancient Greek: Φλεγύας, romanized: Phlegyás) was a king of the Lapiths (or the Phlegyans).

== Family ==
Phlegyas was the son of Ares and Chryse, daughter of Halmus, or of Dotis. In one account, he was mentioned as an autochthon. Phlegyas was the brother of Ixion, another king of the Lapiths, and Gyrton, eponym of a Thessalian town.

Phlegyas was the father of Ixion, in some accounts, as well as Coronis, one of Apollo's lovers. The girl's mother was called Cleopheme, daughter of Malus and the Muse Erato. According to one tradition, he had no children. Another daughter, Gyrtone, was also said to have given her name to Gyrton.

== Mythology ==
Phlegyas succeeded Eteocles, who died without issue, in the government of the district of Orchomenos, which he named Phlegyantis, after himself.

While pregnant with Asclepius, Coronis fell in love with Ischys, son of Elatus. When a hooded crow informed Apollo of the affair, he sent his sister Artemis to kill Coronis, unable to perform the task himself. However, Hermes rescued the baby from Coronis' womb and gave it to the centaur Chiron to raise. Phlegyas, angry at Apollo for killing his daughter, torched the Apollonian temple at Delphi, causing Apollo to kill him with his arrows and condemn him to severe punishment in the lower world. In another version of the myth, Phlegyas had no children and the two brothers Lycus and Nycteus are responsible for his death.

In the Aeneid of Virgil, Phlegyas is shown tormented in Tartarus in the Underworld, warning others not to despise the gods. In the Thebaid of Statius, Phlegyas is also shown to be in the Underworld entombed in a rock by Megaera (one of the Furies) and starved in front of an eternal feast (comparable to the torment of Tantalus).

== Other appearances ==
- In the Divine Comedy poem Inferno, Phlegyas ferries Virgil and Dante across the River Styx which is portrayed as a marsh where the wrathful and sullen lie within Hell's Circle of Wrath.
- Phlegyas appears in the video game Dante's Inferno. This version is a giant fiery rock monster: whether he has always been is unknown. Dante unknowingly rides across the Styx on the wrathful demigod's crown. After fighting his way towards Dis and seeing Beatrice become Lucifer's bride, Dante takes control of Phlegyas and uses him to break into the City of Dis. When Dante reaches the circle of Heresy, Phlegyas breaks the ground he's standing on. Dante manages to jump off in time, but Phlegyas breaks through the floor and plummets into the abyss.
  - In the animated film based on the video game called Dante's Inferno: An Animated Epic, the appearance of Phlegyas (whose vocal effects are provided by Kevin Michael Richardson) is more toned down as he appears in the film as a green-skinned humanoid who willingly took Dante and Virgil through the fifth circle of Hell without incident. He was knocked out by Lucifer when Dante controlled Phlegyas to charge Lucifer.
