= Ixion, King of the Lapiths, Deceived by Juno, Who He Wished to Seduce =

Painting by Peter Paul Rubens

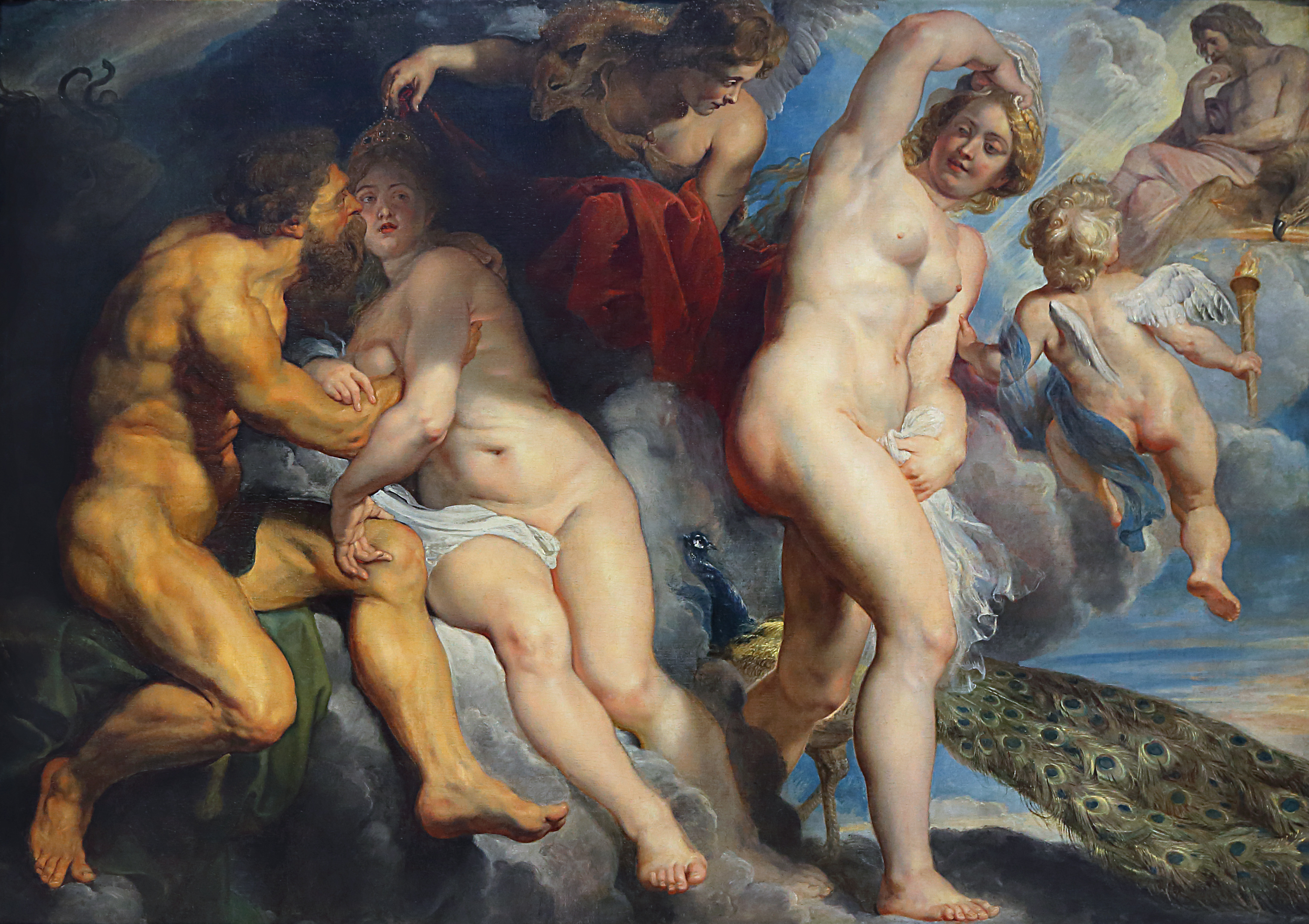
Ixion, King of the Lapiths, Deceived by Juno, Whom He Wished to Seduce (c. 1615) by Rubens

Ixion, King of the Lapiths, Deceived by Juno, Whom He Wished to Seduce is a painting by Peter Paul Rubens, executed c. 1615. It was part of the Duke of Westminster's collection in the 19th century before passing to baron Basile de Schlichting, who left it to the Louvre Museum in 1914.

On the left, it shows Ixion and the fake Juno sent by Jupiter to avenge himself on the seducer. On the right the real Juno, with her peacock moves towards Jupiter.
