= Thoön (mythology) =

Greek mythological characters

In Greek mythology, Thoön (Ancient Greek: Θόων Thóōn) is a name that refers to:

- Thoon, one of the Gigantes (also called Thoas), who, together with Agrios, was clubbed to death by the Moirai during the Gigantomachy.
- Thoon, one of the Trojans, son of Phaenops and twin brother of Xanthus. He and his brother were killed by Diomedes.
- Thoon, another Trojan, who was killed by Antilochus during the attack on the Achaean wall.
- Thoon, a Lycian ally of the Trojans who followed their leader, Sarpedon, to fight in the Trojan War. He was slain by the Greek hero Odysseus during the siege of Troy.
- Thoon, one of the Phaeacians, a participant in the games in honor of Odysseus.
- Thoon, one of the warriors in Dionysus' army during his Indian campaign. He died at the hands of Corymbasus (Κορύμβασος).
- Thoon, son of Icarius of Sparta and Asterodia, daughter of Eurypylus. He was the brother of Amasichus, Phalereus, Pheremmelias, Perilaos and Laodice or Laodamia.

== See also ==
- Naming citation for Jovian asteroid 34746 Thoon
