= Megara (Greek myth) =

In Greek mythology, Megara (/ˈmɛɡərə/; Ancient Greek: Μεγάρα, lit. 'great' or 'large') may refer to two female figures:

- Megara, mother of Ixion, king of the Lapiths, in a rare account. She was murdered by her suitors — Phorbas and Polymelos, after she refused to marry them. To avenge his mother's death, Ixion tracked down and killed these suitors.
- Megara, the daughter of King Creon of Thebes and the first wife of Heracles.
