= Polyphemus (Argonaut) =

Mythical Greek hero

In Greek mythology, Polyphemus (/ˌpɒlɪˈfiːməs/; Ancient Greek: Πολύφημος, romanized: Polyphēmos) was a Greek hero and also an Argonaut from Larissa.

== Family ==
Polyphemus was the son of the Lapith chief, Elatus, by Hippea and thus, possibly the brother of Caeneus, Ischys and Ampycus. Otherwise, Euphorion and Socrates erroneously called him the son of Poseidon which is apparently pertaining to the Cyclops Polyphemus instead of this mortal hero. According to one source, he was married to Laonome, sister of Heracles. In some accounts, Polyphemus was called the beloved of the latter hero.

== Mythology ==
Polyphemus, as a Lapith, was remembered for having fought against the Centaurs in the days of his youth. In Iliad, Nestor numbers "the godlike Polyphemus" among an earlier generation of heroes of his youth, "the strongest men that Earth has bred, the strongest men against the strongest enemies, a savage mountain-dwelling tribe (i.e. centaur) whom they utterly destroyed." No trace of such an oral tradition, which Homer's listeners would have recognized in Nestor's allusion, survived in literary epic.

Years later, he joined the expedition of the Argonauts. During their stay in Bithynia, Polyphemus was the one to hear Hylas cry as the youth was being dragged away by the nymphs, and when he helped Heracles search for Hylas, both were left behind by the crew of the Argo. Having settled in Mysia, Polyphemus founded the city of Cius, of which he became king. Later, however, he set out to search for his fellow Argonauts and died in the land of the Chalybes. He was buried by the seashore under a poplar tree.
