= Taenarus (mythology) =

In Greek mythology, Taenarus (/tǎi̯.na.ros/ or /ˈte.na.ros/; Ancient Greek: Ταίναρος, romanized: Taínaros) was the eponym of Cape Taenarum, Mount Taenarum, and the city Taenarus at Peloponnese. In different accounts, he is given as:

- Taenarus, son of Zeus and brother of Calabrus and Geraestus. The three brothers were said to have sailed to Peloponnese and to have seized a portion of land there, where Taenarus founded a sanctuary of Poseidon known as "Taenarum".
- Taenarus, son of Poseidon.
- Taenarus, son of Elatus, himself son of Icarius, and Erymede, daughter of Damasiclus; was said to have had the city, the mountain, and the harbor named after him. Stephanus (who writes of him as a son rather than a grandson of Icarius) considers him to be a figure distinct from Taenarus, son of Zeus.

Taenaran gateway: Taenarus, at the tip of the middle peninsula at the south of Peloponnese, was a conventional entrance to the underworld.
