= Leucadius =

Person from Greek mythology

In Greek mythology, the name Leucadius /luːˈkeɪdiəs/ may refer to:

- Leucadius, a son of Icarius and Polycaste, co-ruler of Acarnania with his brother Alyzeus, and the eponym of Leucas.
- Leucadius, a surname of Apollo.
