= Erasus =

Greek mythological figure

In Greek mythology, Erasus (Ancient Greek: Ἔρασος) was a member of the Arcadian royal family. He was the son of Triphylus, son of King Arcas of Arcadia.
