= Chalciope =

Several characters in Greek mythology

Chalciope (/ˌkælˈsaɪ.əpiː/; Ancient Greek: Χαλκιόπη, romanized: Khalkiópē, lit. 'bronze-face'), in Greek mythology, is a name that may refer to several characters.

- Chalciope, daughter of King Aeëtes of Colchis and wife of Phrixus.
- Chalciope, daughter of Rhexenor (or of King Chalcodon of Euboea) and the second wife of King Aegeus of Athens. She bore no heirs to the king thus given by the king to one of his friends.
- Chalciope, daughter of Eurypylus of Cos, mother of Thessalus by Heracles.
- Chalciope, consort of the aforementioned Thessalus, mother of his son Antiphus, presumably also of Pheidippus and Nesson.
- Chalciope or Chalcippe, the Athenian daughter of the Argonaut Phalerus.
- Chalciope, mother of the musician Linus by Apollo.
