= Calabrus =

In Greek mythology a son of Zeus

In Greek mythology, Calabrus (Ancient Greek: Καλάβρῳ) was a son of Zeus and brother of Taenarus and Geraestus. The three brothers were said to have sailed to Peloponnese and to have seized a portion of land there.
