= Phalerus (Argonaut) =

Ancient Greek mythological figure

In Greek mythology, Phalerus (/fəˈliːrəs/; Ancient Greek: Φάληρος, romanized: Phálēros, lit. 'bright' or 'shining') was the son of Alcon from Athens. He is counted among the Argonauts.

== Mythology ==
Phalerus was Alcon's only son, his father took pride in sending him to join the Argonauts, so that he would shine conspicuous among those heroes, “yet no other sons had he to care for his old age and livelihood”.

It is related of Phalerus that he escaped from Athens to Chalcis in Euboea together with his daughter Chalciope; the Chalcidians refused to deliver him up at the demand of his father. He is credited with having founded Gyrton; he and Acamas are also the reputed founders of the temple of Aphrodite and Isis in Soli. In Phalerum, of which he presumably was the eponym, there was an altar to his and Theseus’s children.

== Name ==
The field of Phaleristics – the study of medals – is derived from Phalerus's name.
