= Lusia (Attica) =

Coordinates: 38°00′02″N 23°41′29″E

Lusia or Lousia (Ancient Greek: Λουσία) was a deme of ancient Attica, of the phyle Oeneïs, sending one delegate to the Athenian Boule. Stephanus of Byzantium notes it was named after a heroine named Lusia, a daughter of Hyacinthus the Lacedaemonian.

The deme is attested in inscriptions; one a funerary inscription of a townsperson, another describing the deme's contributions to construction of the Eleusinion.

The site of Lousia is in the Kephisos valley, west of modern Athens.
