= Aegleis =

Ancient Greek mythological figure

In Greek mythology, Aegleis (Ancient Greek: Αἰγληίς, romanized: Aiglēís, lit. 'daughter of Aegle' or 'pertaining to brightness and splendor') was a daughter of Hyacinthus who had emigrated from Lacedaemon to Athens. During the siege of Athens by Minos, in the reign of Aegeus, she was with her sisters Antheis, Lytaea, and Orthaea, were sacrificed on the tomb of Geraestus the Cyclops, for the purpose of averting a pestilence then raging at Athens.
