= Phorbas =

Name of several characters in Greek mythology

Phorbas carries the infant Oedipus, Attic red-figure neck amphora c. 450-445 BC in the BnF Museum

In Greek mythology, Phorbas (/ˈfɔːrbəs/; Ancient Greek: Φόρβας Phórbās), or Phorbaceus /fɔːrˈbeɪˌʃ(j)uːs/, may refer to:

- Phorbas, son of Lapithes and Orsinome, and a brother of Periphas.
- Phorbas, son of Triopas and Hiscilla, daughter of Myrmidon.
- Phorbas, king of Argos, father of a different Triopas who succeeded him as king. Triopas was the brother of Arestor
- Phorbas, a shepherd of King Laius, who found the infant Oedipus on the hillside and ensured his survival to fulfill his destiny. A number of sculptures, ranging from the 14th to the 19th century, memorialize Phorbas' rescue of Oedipus. He might be the same as Phorbas, attendant of Antigone.
- Phorbas, listed as a king or archon of Athens
- Phorbas of Lesbos, father of Diomede
- Phorbas of Troy, who was favored and made rich by Hermes. He had a son Ilioneus, who was killed by Peneleos.
- Phorbas, son of Metion of Syene, who fought on Phineus' side against Perseus
- Phorbas of Acarnania, son of Poseidon, who went to Eleusis together with Eumolpus to fight against Erechtheus, and was killed by the opponent.
- Phorbas, one of the twelve younger Panes
- Phorbas, son of Helios and father of Ambracia (eponym of the city of Ambracia). Ambracia could also have been daughter of Augeas, granddaughter of Phorbas of Thessaly.
- Phorbas, who is called father of Tiresias by the Cretans
- Phorbas, charioteer of Theseus
- Phorbas, father of Dexithea who, according to one version, was the mother of Romulus and Remus by Aeneas
- Phorbas, suitor of Megara, mother of Ixion in one source. Together with another suitor, Polymelos, they slain Megara and, in vengeance, were murdered by the latter’s son.

== See also ==
- Phorbus (mythology)
