= Kandila, Aetolia-Acarnania =

Kandila Κανδήλα
- Settlement
- Location within Greece
- Coordinates: 38°42′N 20°57′E
- Country: Greece
- Administrative region: West Greece
- Regional unit: Aetolia-Acarnania
- Municipality: Xiromero
- Municipal unit: Alyzia

Population (2021)
  - Total: 866
- Time zone: UTC+2 (EET)
  - Summer (DST): UTC+3 (EEST)

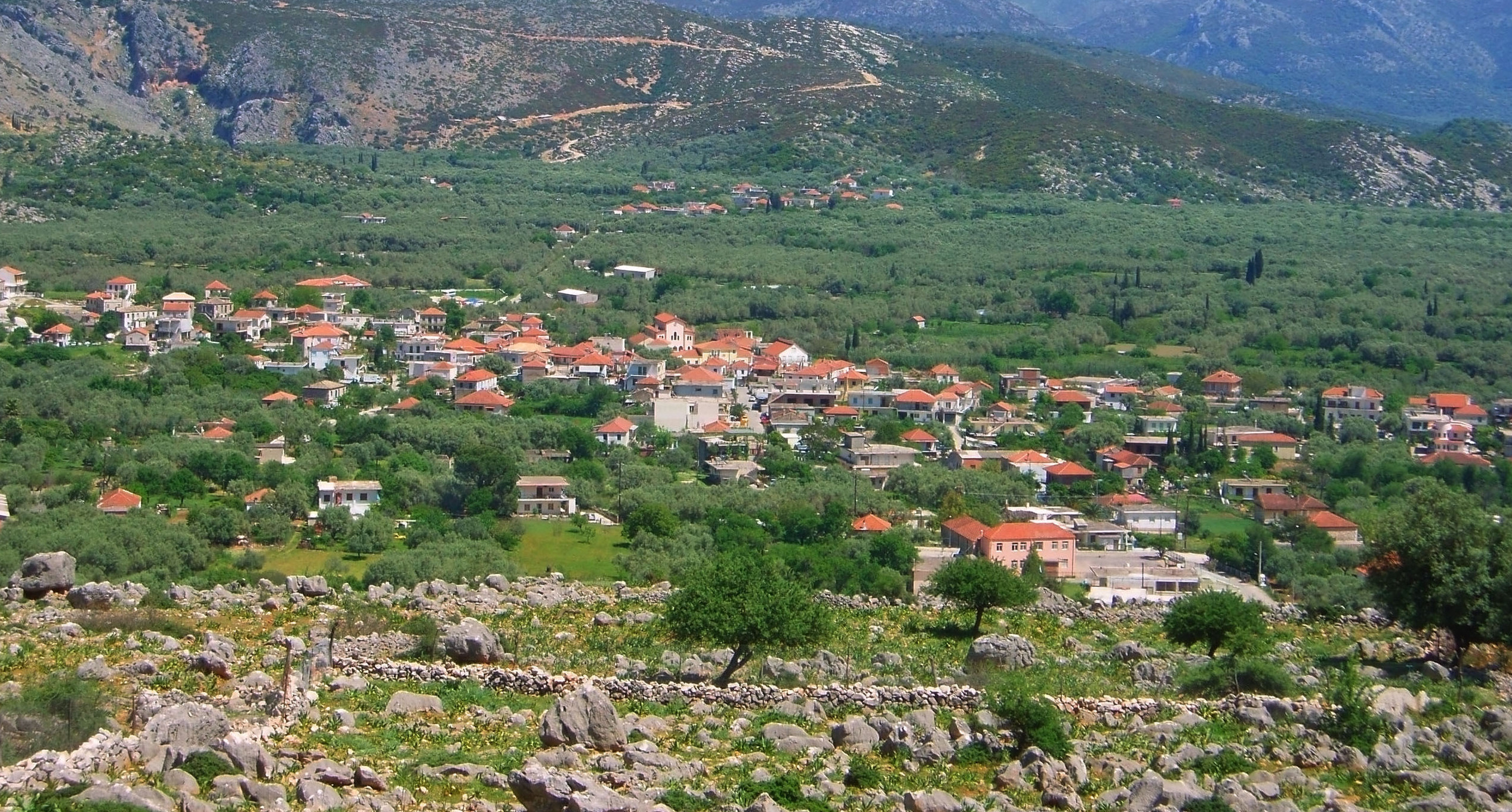
Kandila village, Aetoloacarnania, Greece

Kandila (Greek: Κανδήλα) is a town in the western part of Aetolia-Acarnania, Greece. Kandila was the seat of the former municipality Alyzia. It is situated 3 km from the Ionian Sea, in a plain at the western foot of the Acarnanian Mountains. It is 4 km north of Mytikas, 40 km west of Agrinio and 33 km southeast of Preveza. The ruins of ancient Alyzia are located here.

== Population ==
Year	Population
1981	1,260
1991	1,324
2001	1,266
2011	1,048
2021	866

== See also ==
- List of settlements in Aetolia-Acarnania
