= Iphthime =

Mythological Greek characters

In Greek mythology, the name Iphthime /ɪpˈθaɪmiː/ (Ancient Greek: Ἰφθίμη, romanized: Iphthímē) refers to:

- Iphthime, daughter of Icarius, a sister of Penelope and Perileos. She became the wife of Eumelus from Pherae and possibly, the mother of his son, Zeuxippus. In Homer's Odyssey, Athena creates an image in Iphthime's likeness and sends this to a sleeping Penelope. This image conveys encouragement to Penelope after the latter confides in it her worries for her husband Odysseus and her son Telemachus. Scholiasts on Homer inform that she was also known under several other names: Hypsipyle, Mede, Laodice or Laodamia, and that her mother was Asterodia.
- Iphthime, daughter of Dorus, mother of the Satyrs Lycus, Pherespondus and Pronomus by Hermes.

The name is the feminine form of the adjective ἴφθιμος, which is a Homeric epithet of vague meaning, usually connoting something like robustness or faithfulness when applied to a female human.
