= Erato (dryad) =

Greek mythological figure

In Greek mythology, Erato (/ˈɛrətoʊ/; Ancient Greek: Ἐρατώ, romanized: Eratō, lit. 'desired', 'lovely' or 'beloved') was a dryad. She was the priestess and prophetess of the god Pan, verses were attributed to her at an ancient oracle of the god, located at Megalopolis near Acacesium. Erato was married to Arcas, the son of Zeus and Callisto, and bore him three sons, Azan, Apheidas, and Elatus.
