= Gyrton (mythology) =

In Greek mythology, Gyrton (Ancient Greek: Γυρτών) was a brother of Phlegyas, who built the town of Gyrton on the Peneius river, and from whom it received its name. Others derived the name of that town from Gyrtone, who is called a daughter of Phlegyas.
