= Azan (mythology) =

In Greek mythology, Azan (Ancient Greek: Ἀζᾶν) may refer to the following personages:

- Azan, king of Azania in Arcadia and the son of King Arcas and the Dryad Erato or Leanira, brother of Apheidas, Elatus and Hyperippe. Azan was the father of Cleitor and Coronis, mother of Asclepius by Apollo. When Azan and his brothers grew up, their father Arcas divided the land between them into three parts: Azan received the district which was named after him, to Apheidas fell Tegea and Elatus got Mount Cyllene, which down to that time had received no name. When Azan died, the first funeral games in history were held in his honor. It was at these games that Aetolus accidentally killed Apis. Azan's heir to the throne was his son Cleitor but he was childless, thus succeeded by Aepytus, son of Elatus.
- Azan, husband of Hippolyte, daughter of Dexamenus, who was threatened with violence by the Centaur Eurytion.
