= Geraestus (Euboea) =

Coordinates: 37°58′37″N 24°32′20″E

Geraestus or Geraistos (Ancient Greek: Γεραιστός) was a town of ancient Euboea on a cape with the same name, at the southeast extremity of the island. It had a celebrated temple of Poseidon, and at its foot there was a well-frequented port, which seems to have been small, though Livy calls it "nobilis Euboeae portus." It is mentioned by Homer in the Odyssey as one of the places where the ships of Nestor stopped on the way back from Troy to Pylos.

Its site is located near the modern Porto Kastri.
