= Alcon (mythology) =

The name Alcon (/ˈælkɒn/; Ancient Greek: Ἄλκων) or Alco can refer to a number of people from classical mythology:

- Alcon, a Laconian prince as the son of King Hippocoon, usurper of Tyndareus. He was one of the hunters of the Calydonian Boar. Alcon was killed, together with his father and brothers, by Heracles, and had a heroon at Sparta.
- Alcon, a son of Erechtheus, king of Athens, and father of Phalerus the Argonaut. A fragment of Ephorus describes him as the son of Abas, king of the Abantes in Euboea, and brother to Arethousa and Dias.
- Gaius Valerius Flaccus describes an Alcon who is a skillful archer; when a serpent had entwined his son, he shot the serpent without hurting his child. He is mentioned by Virgil, and Servius calls him a Cretan, relating almost the same story as that from Valerius Flaccus.
- Alcon, a son of Ares, and another one of the hunters of the Calydonian Boar, according to Hyginus.
- Another Alcon is mentioned by Ovid as a craftsman who made a wonderful mixing bowl given to Aeneas by Anius king of Delos.
- Another, otherwise unknown personage, of the same name occurs in Cicero.
- August Meineke renders the name of Halon, an Attic healing hero, as Alcon.
