= Alyzeus =

Ancient Greek mythological figure

Alyzeus (Ancient Greek: Ἀλυζεύς) was in Greek mythology a son of Icarius and Polycaste, and brother of Penelope and Leucadius. After his father's death, he reigned in conjunction with his brother over Acarnania, and is said to have founded the town of Alyzeia (modern Alyzia) there.
