= Laodamia =

Greek mythological figures

In Greek mythology, the name Laodamia (Ancient Greek: Λαοδάμεια, romanized: Laodámeia, lit. 'tamer of the people') referred to:

- Laodamia (or Hippodamia), a Lycian princess as the daughter of Bellerophon and Philonoe, daughter of King Iobates. Her mother was also known Alkimedousa, Anticleia, Pasandra or Cassandra. Laodamia's brothers were Hippolochus and Isander, and by Zeus, she became the mother of Sarpedon. She was shot by Artemis (that is, died a sudden, instant death) one day when she was weaving. Diodorus Siculus called her Deidamia, the wife of Evander, who was a son of Sarpedon the elder and by her father of Sarpedon the younger. Xanthus was also called the father of Sarpedon according to one account.
- Laodamia, daughter of Acastus and Astydamia and the wife of Protesilaus. When her husband fell in the Trojan War, Laodamia committed suicide rather than be without him.
- Laodamia or Leaneira, an Arcadian queen as the wife of King Arcas by whom she became the mother of Elatus, Apheidas and Triphylus. Laodamia was the daughter of King Amyclas of Sparta and Diomede, daughter of Lapithes. Through this parentage, she was considered the sister of Argalus, Cynortes, Hyacinthus, Polyboea, Hegesandra and, in other versions, of Daphne.
- Laodamia, daughter of Alcmaeon, wife of Peleus and mother by him of Polydora. But see Antigone.
- Laodamia, wife of Anticlus. Her husband was one of the men who were hiding in the Trojan Horse.
- Laodamia, alternate name for Iphthime, daughter of Icarius of Sparta and Asterodia, daughter of Eurypylus. She was the sister of Penelope, Amasichus, Phalereus, Thoon, Pheremmelias, Perilaos. Laodamia was also called Laodice, Mede and Hypsipyle.
- Laodamia or Arsinoe, nurse of Orestes. She saved his life by sending him to Strophius after the murder of Agamemnon, whereas Aegisthus killed her own son, taking him for Orestes.
- Laodamia, alternate name for Hippodamia (wife of Pirithous) occurring in a red-figure vase painting.
