= Aepytus (son of Elatus) =

King of Arcadia in Greek mythology

In Greek mythology, Aepytus (Ancient Greek: Αἴπυτος, romanized: Aíputos or Aípytos, lit. 'steep', 'high' or 'lofty') was one of the mythical kings of Arcadia who originally ruled over Phaesana on the Alpheius.

== Family ==
Aepytus was the son of King Elatus. He was the father of Tlesenor and Peirithous.

== Mythology ==
When Cleitor, the son of Azan, died without leaving any issue, Aepytus succeeded him and became king of the Arcadians, a part of whose country was called after him Aepytis. He is said to have been killed during the chase on Mount Sepia by the bite of a venomous snake. His tomb there was still shown in the time of Pausanias, and he was anxious to see it, because it was mentioned by Homer.
