= Aepytus =

Ancient Greek mythological figures

Aepytus (Ancient Greek: Αἴπυτος, romanized: Aíputos or Aípytos, lit. 'steep', 'high' or 'lofty') can refer to several people in Greek mythology:

- Aepytus, king of Arcadia and son of Elatus.
- Aepytus, also a king of Arcadia and son of Hippothous.
- Aepytus, son of the Heraclid Cresphontes.

The name is not to be confused with Iapetus (Ancient Greek: Ἰαπετός, romanized: Iapetós) or Iphitos (Ancient Greek: Ἴφιτος, romanized: Íphitos).
