= Erymede =

Daughter of Damasiclus in Greek mythology

In Greek mythology, Erymede (Ancient Greek: Ἐρυμήδη, romanized: Erymēdē) was the daughter of Damasiclus, son of Icarius, and mother of Taenarus, eponym of the Cape Taenarum, Mount Taenarum and the city Taenarus at Peloponnese. The latter's father and Erymede's spouse was Elatus, son of Icarius, which makes them technically niece and uncle. In another account, Taenarus was instead called the son of Icarius himself.
