= Aeneas and the Sibyl in the Underworld =

Painting by Jan Brueghel the Younger

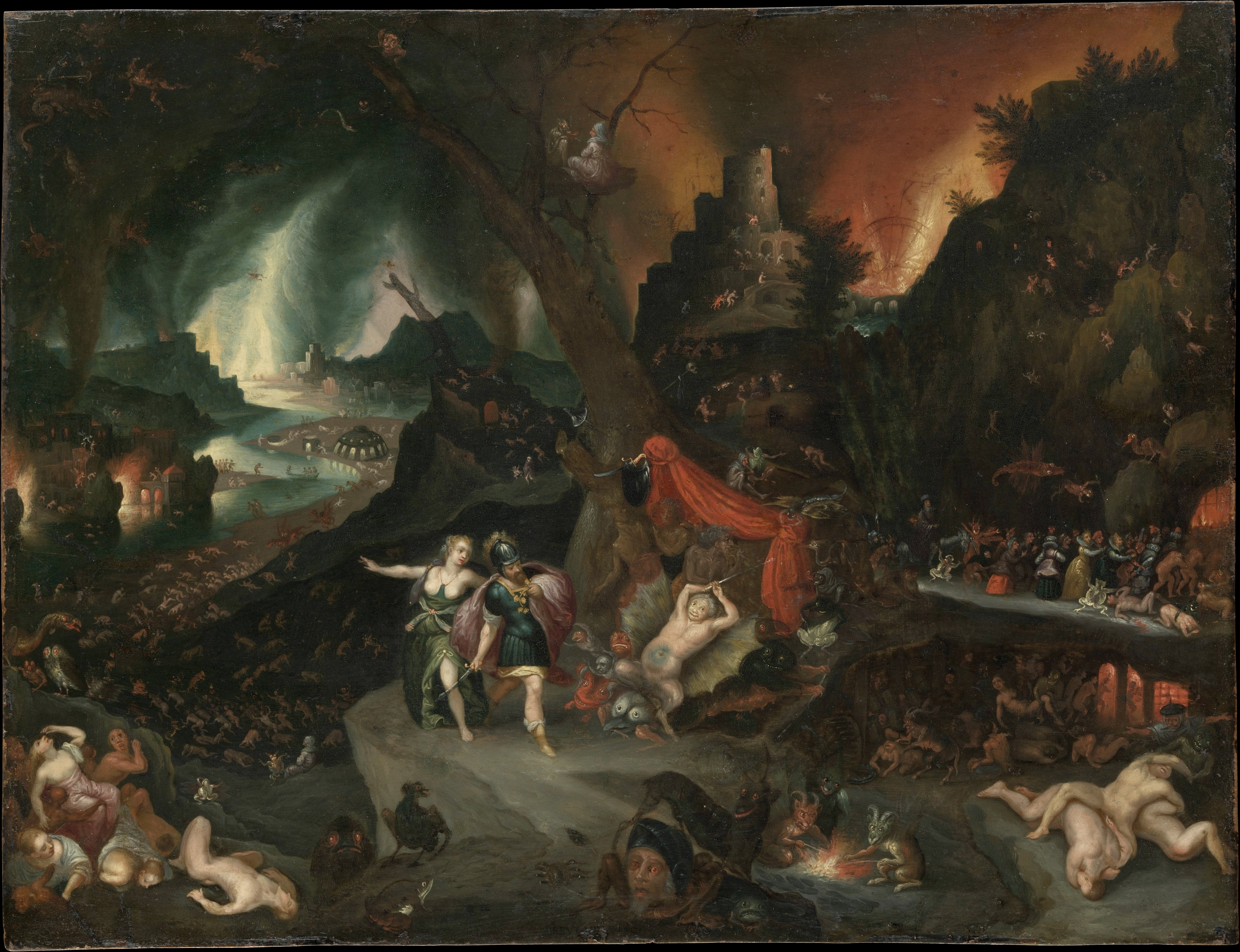
- Artist: Jan Brueghel the Younger
- Year: 1630s
- Medium: Oil on copper
- Dimensions: 27 cm × 35.88 cm (10.5 in × 14.125 in)

Aeneas and the Sibyl in the Underworld is an artwork by Jan Brueghel the Younger painted in the 1630s.

The painting has been in the collection of the Metropolitan Museum of Art in New York City since 1991. The painting is very similar in composition to a painting of the same subject made circa 1600 by his father Jan Brueghel the Elder, held at the Kunsthistorisches Museum in Vienna. Elder, in turn, was inspired by the necrogeographies of Hieronymous Bosch. The painting draws upon imagery from Aeneid § Book 6: Underworld, an epic poem written in ancient Rome by Publius Vergilius Maro. Aeneas, the protagonist, is being guided through Hades by the Cumaean Sibyl, a temple priestess.
