= Hyacinthus the Lacedaemonian =

Figure in Greek mythology

In Greek mythology, Hyacinthus (/hy.á.kin.tʰos/ or /iˈa.cin.θos/; Ancient Greek: Ὑάκινθος, romanized: Huákinthos) was a Lacedaemonian who is said to have moved to Athens.

== Mythology ==
In compliance with an oracle, to have caused his four daughters to be sacrificed on the tomb of the Cyclops Geraestus, for the purpose of delivering the city from famine and the plague, under which it was suffering during the war with Minos over the death of the latter's son Androgeos. Hyacinthus's daughters, who were sacrificed either to Athena or Persephone, were known in the Attic legends by the name of the "Hyacinthides", which they derived from their father.

The names and numbers of the Hyacinthides differ in the different writers. The author of the Bibliotheca mentions four (Antheis, Aegleis, Orthaea, and Lytaea), while Hyginus only mentions Antheis. One account represents them as married, although they were sacrificed as maidens, whence they are sometimes called simply αἱ παρθένοι. Stephanus of Byzantium calls one of them Lousia, eponym of a demos, Lousia, of the phyle Oineis. Some traditions conflate them with the daughters of Erechtheus and relate that they received their name from the village of Hyacinthus, where they were sacrificed at the time when Athens was attacked by the Eleusinians and Thracians, or Thebans. Some of these traditions further confound them with Agraulos, Herse, and Pandrosus, or with the Hyades. The story of Leos and his daughters is also comparable to that of Hyacinthus and the Hyacinthides.
