= Gyrton (Thessaly) =

Ancient Greek town and polis

Coordinates: 39°47′53″N 22°34′11″E

Map showing ancient Thessaly. Gyrton is shown in the upper centre north of Larissa.

Gyrton (Ancient Greek: Γυρτών) or Gyrtona or Gyrtone (Γυρτώνη) was a town and polis (city-state) of Perrhaebia in ancient Thessaly, situated in a fertile plain between the rivers Titaresius and Peneius. Strabo connects Gyrton with the mouth of the Peneius; but it is evident from the description of Livy, whose account has been derived from Polybius, that it stood in some part of those plains in which Phalanna, Atrax, and Larissa were situated. It was only one day's march from Phalanna to Gyrton. It was an ancient town even in Classical times, mentioned by Homer, and continued to be a place of importance till later times, when it is called opulent by Apollonius Rhodius. It was said to have been the original abode of the Phlegyae, and to have been founded by Gyrton, the brother of Phlegyas. Others say that it derived its name from Gyrtone, who is called a daughter of Phlegyas.

The Gyrtonians are mentioned among the Thessalians who sent aid to the Athenians at the commencement of the Peloponnesian War. The name of the city frequently occurs at a later period, by Livy, Polybius, Pomponius Mela/ Pliny the Elder, and Ptolemy.

Gyrton also minted coins.

The location of Gyrton is a site called Mourlari, southeast of the modern town of Evangelismos.

== Archaeology ==
The acropolis and the lower city were fortified, possibly already in the Archaic Period. The walls were built with slate.

Gyrton minted silver and bronze coins in the 4th century BCE. Those at the end of this century had on the obverse a young Gyrton next to the head of a horse, or of Apollo or of Zeus laureate. On the reverse was the nymph Gyrtona, The legends were "ΓΥΡΥΟΝΙΟΝ", "ΓΥΡΤΩΝΙΟΝ", or "ΓΥΡΤΩΝΙΩΝ".
