= Ixion =

King of the Lapiths in Greek mythology

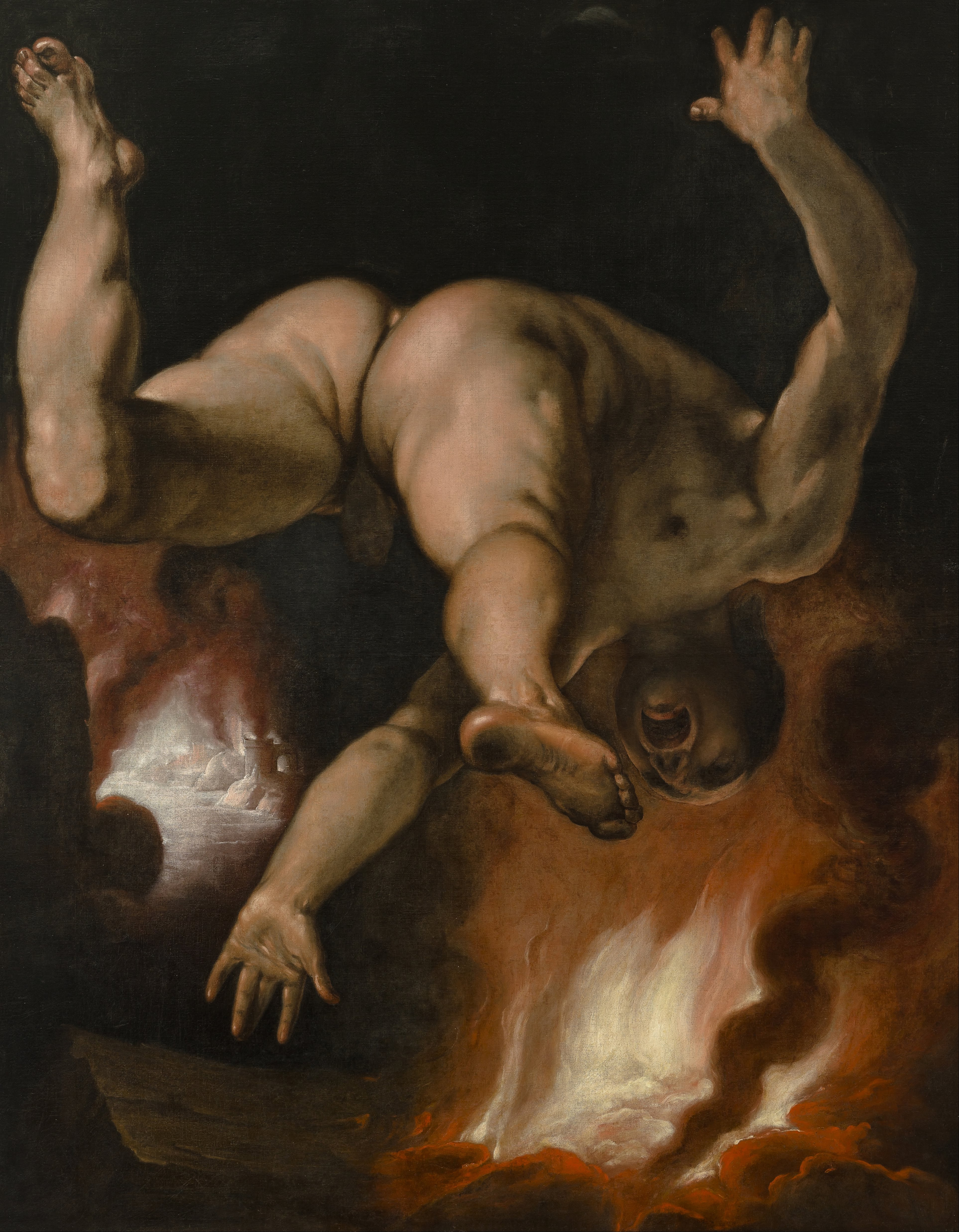
The Fall of Ixion by Cornelis van Haarlem

In Greek mythology, Ixion (/ɪkˈsaɪən/ ik-SY-ən; Ancient Greek: Ἰξίων, romanized: Ixíōn) was king of the Lapiths, the most ancient tribe of Thessaly. Ixion desired Hera, the queen of the gods and wife of Zeus, and his arrogant attempt to have sex with her led to his eternal punishment in Tartarus.

== Family ==
Ixion was the son of Perimele, and either Ares, Leonteus, or Antion, or Phlegyas (whose name connotes "fiery"). Ixion had a son named Pirithous Pirithous may have possibly instead been his stepson, if Zeus were Pirithous's father, as Zeus claims to his wife Hera in Iliad 14.

== Background ==
Ixion married Dia, a daughter of Deioneus, and promised his father-in-law a valuable present. However, he did not pay the bride price, so Deioneus stole some of Ixion's horses in retaliation. Ixion concealed his resentment and invited his father-in-law to a feast at Larissa. When Deioneus arrived, Ixion pushed him into a bed of burning coals and wood, concealed underneath wood and ash. These circumstances are secondary to the fact of Ixion's primordial act of murder of a kinsman and a guest. The crime could be accounted for quite differently: in the Greek Anthology, among a collection of inscriptions from a temple in Cyzicus, is an epigrammatic description of Ixion slaying Phorbas and Polymelus, who had slain his mother, Megara because she had refused to marry one of them.

Defiled by his act, Ixion went mad; the neighboring princes were so offended by his act of treachery and violation of xenia that they refused to perform the rituals that would cleanse Ixion of his guilt (see catharsis). Thereafter, Ixion lived as an outlaw and was shunned. By killing his father-in-law, Ixion was reckoned the first man guilty of kin-slaying in Greek mythology.

This act alone would have warranted Ixion a terrible punishment, but Zeus took pity on Ixion and brought him to Olympus and introduced him at the table of the gods. Instead of being grateful, Ixion grew lustful for Hera, Zeus's wife, a further violation of guest–host relations and an act of hubris against the king of the gods. Zeus found out about his intentions and made a cloud in the shape of Hera, which became known as Nephele (from nephos "cloud") and tricked Ixion into coupling with it. From the union of Ixion and the false-Hera cloud came Imbros or Centauros, who mated with the Magnesian mares on Mount Pelion, Pindar told, engendering the race of Centaurs, who are called the Ixionidae from their descent.

Ixion was expelled from Olympus and blasted with a thunderbolt. Zeus ordered Hermes to bind Ixion to a winged fiery wheel that was always spinning. Therefore, Ixion was bound to a burning solar wheel for all eternity, at first spinning across the heavens, but in later myth transferred to Tartarus.

Some versions of the myth portray Ixion as being trapped in Hades after his death.

Only when Orpheus played his lyre during his trip to the Underworld to rescue Eurydice did Ixion's wheel stop spinning for a while.

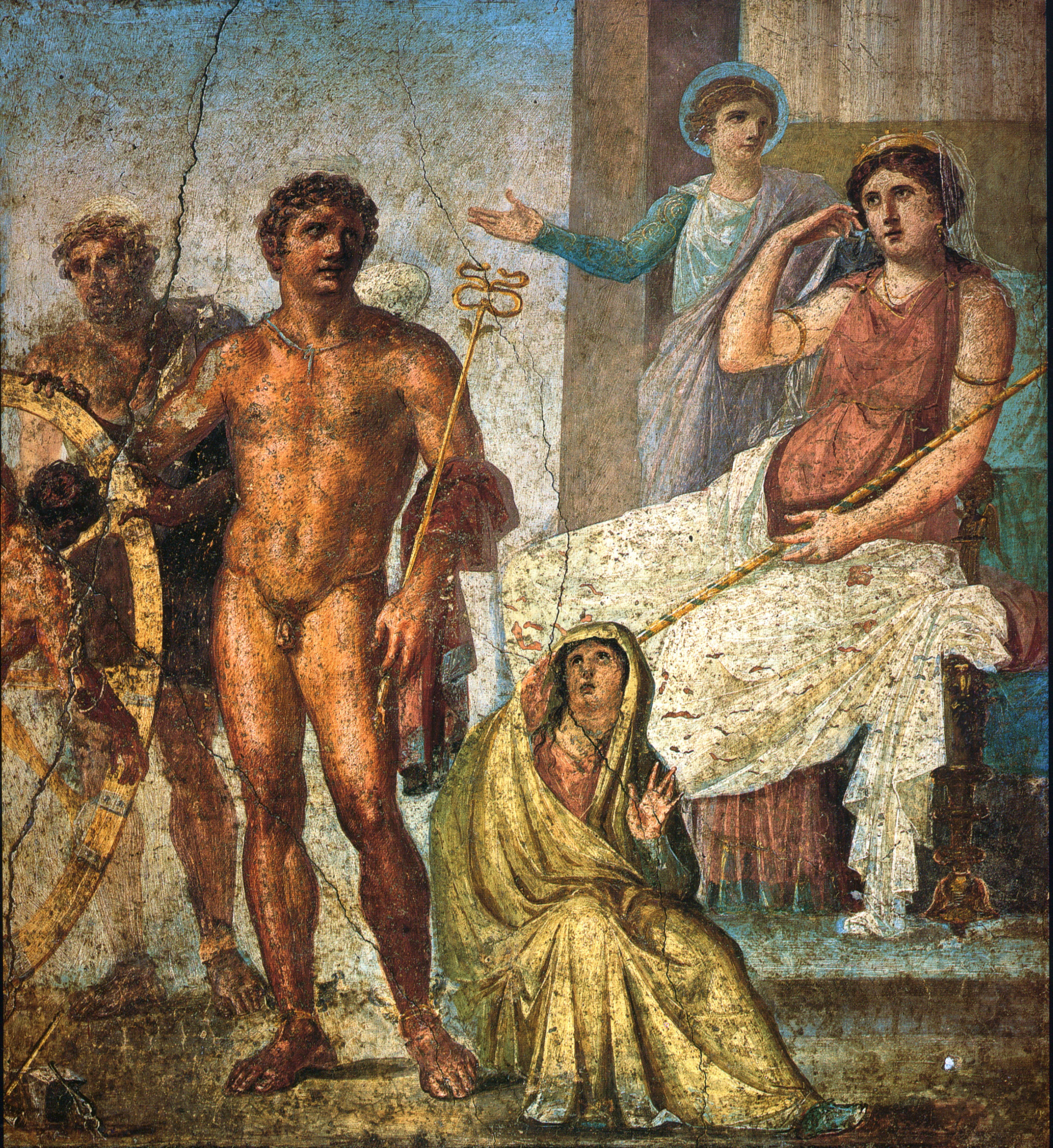
'Punishment of Ixion', a Roman fresco from the eastern wall of the triclinium in the House of the Vettii, Pompeii, Fourth Style (60–79 CE) Mercury is in the center, holding the caduceus. Nephele sits at Mercury's feet. On the right Juno sits on her throne. Iris stands behind Juno, gesturing. Vulcan is the blond figure at the upper left, holding and standing behind the wheel. Ixion is at the lower left, already bound on the wheel.

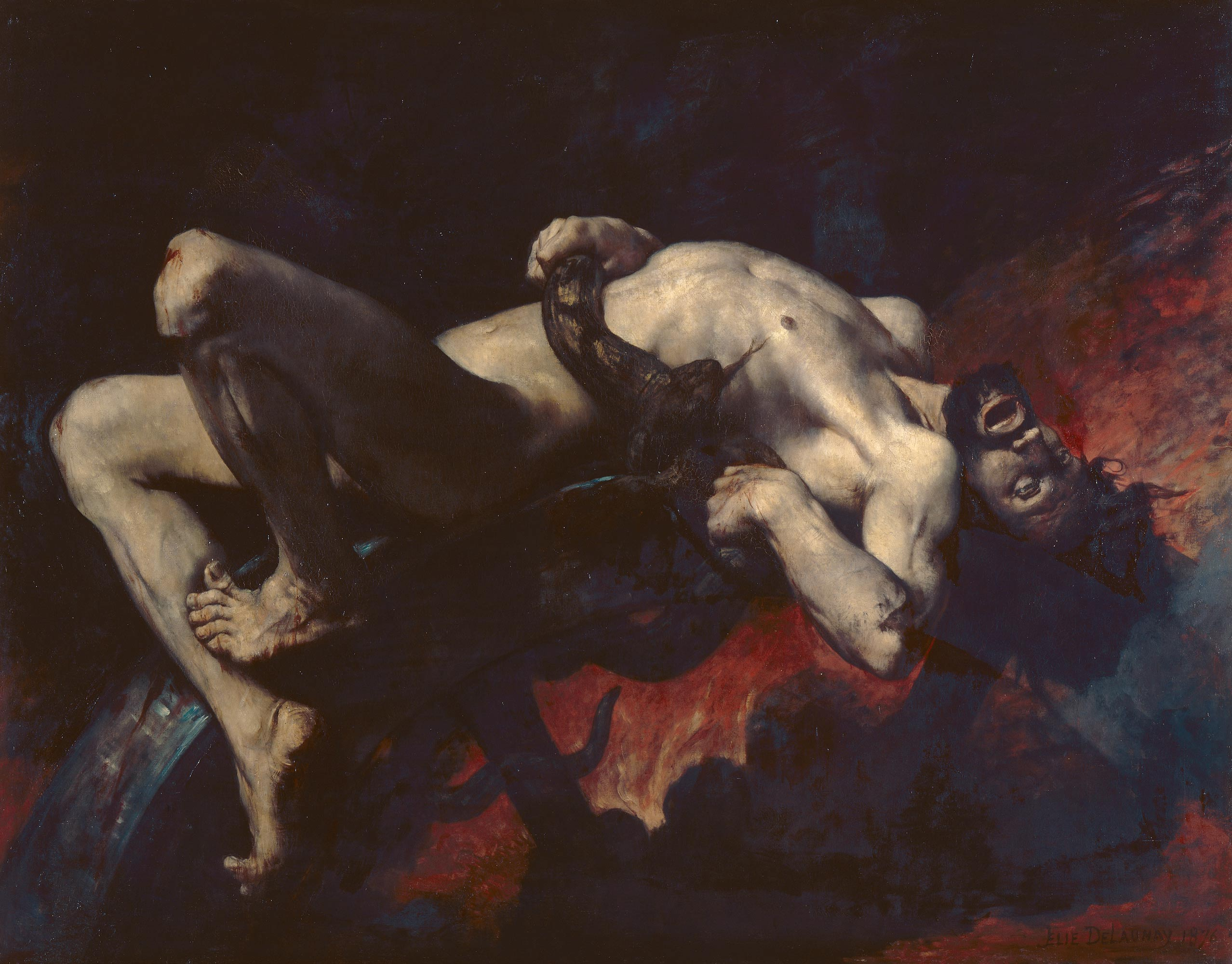
Ixion by Jules-Elie Delaunay (1876)

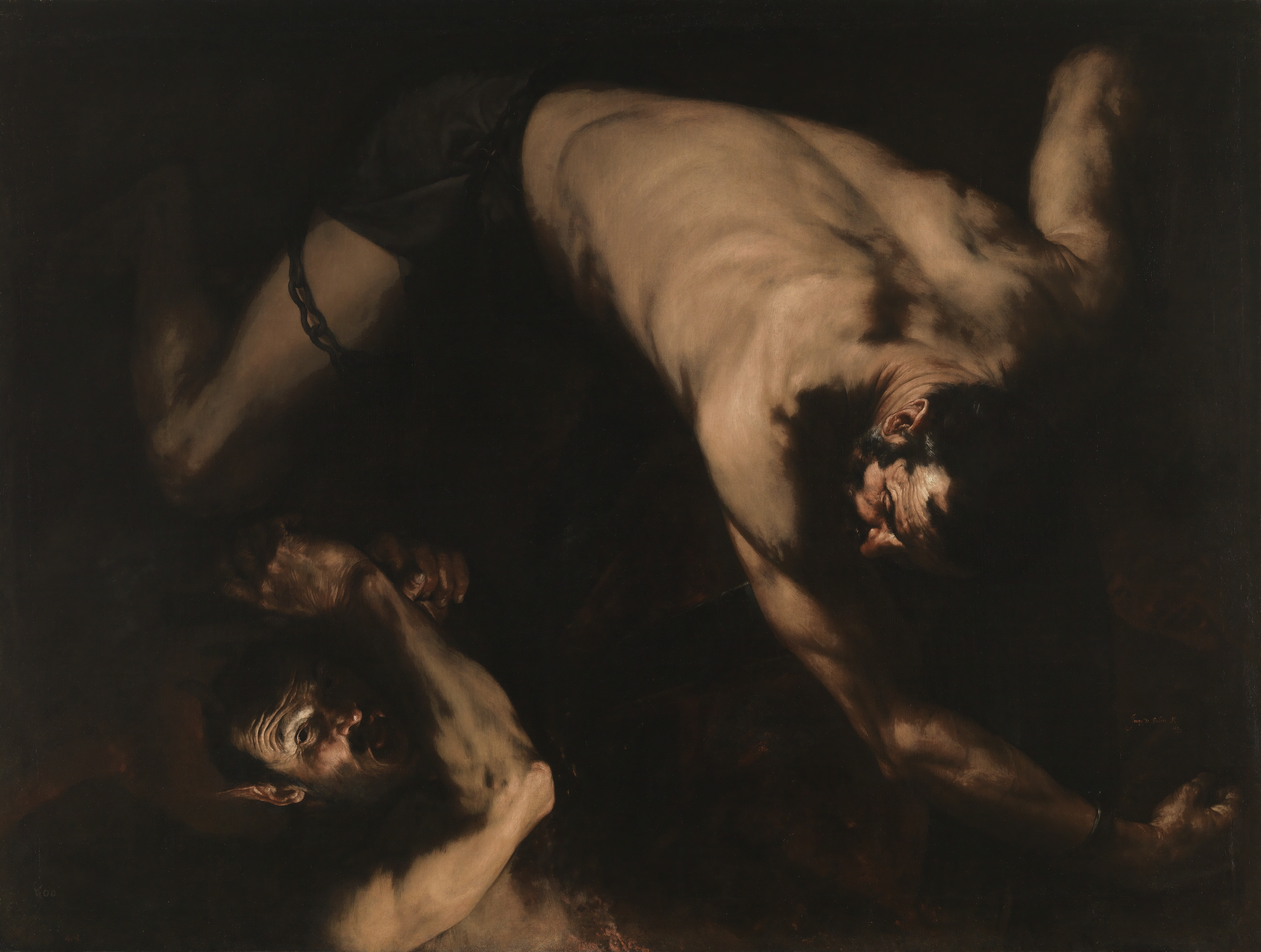
José Ribera's Ixion (1632) Museo del Prado.

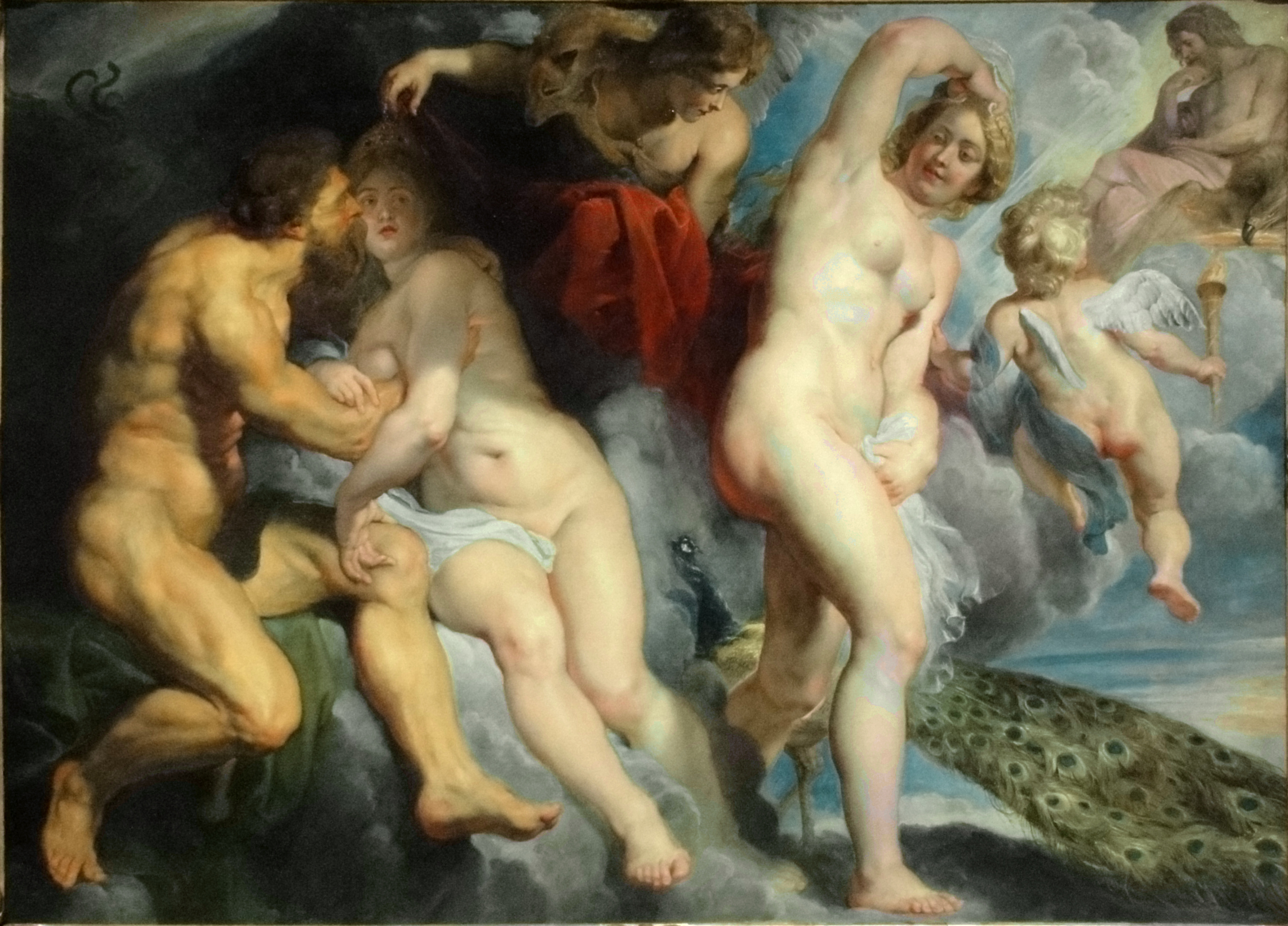
King Ixion fooled by Juno, whom he wanted to seduce (1615 ) Peter Paul Rubens, Louvre Museum

== Analysis ==
Robert L. Fowler observes that "The details are very odd, the narrative motivation creaks at every juncture ... the myth smacks of aetiology." He notes that Martin Nilsson suggested an origin in rain-making magic, with which he concurs: "In Ixion's case the necessary warning about the conduct of magic has taken the form of blasphemous and dangerous conduct on the part of the first officiant."

In the fifth century, Pindar's Second Pythian Ode (c. 476–468 BC) expands on the example of Ixion, applicable to Hiero I of Syracuse, the tyrant of whom the poet sings. Aeschylus, Sophocles, Euripides and Timasitheos each wrote a tragedy of Ixion though none of these accounts have survived.

Ixion was a figure also known to the Etruscans; he is depicted in an engraving on the back of the mirror, bound to an eight-spoked, winged wheel c. 460–450 BC, now in the collection of the British Museum. Whether the Etruscans shared the Ixion figure with Hellenes from early times or whether Ixion figured among those Greek myths that were adapted at later dates to fit the Etruscan world-view is unknown.

== See also ==
- Sisyphus
- Wanyūdō

== Sources ==
- Apollodorus (1921) The Library. translation by J.G. Frazer. Cambridge, MA: Harvard University Press / London, UK: William Heinemann. ISBN 0-674-99135-4. Online version at the Perseus Digital Library. Greek text available from the same website.
- Diodorus Siculus (1989) The Library of History. translated by C.H. Oldfather. Loeb Classical Library, Vol. 3. Cambridge, MA: Harvard University Press / London, UK: William Heinemann. Books 4.59–8. Online version at Bill Thayer's Web Site
- Diodorus Siculus (1888–1890) Bibliotheca Historica. Vol 1–2. Immanel Bekker; Ludwig Dindorf; Friedrich Vogel (eds.) Leipzig, DE: B.G. Teubneri. Greek text available at the Perseus Digital Library.
- Gaius Julius Hyginus (n.d.) Fabulae from The Myths of Hyginus translated and edited by Mary Grant. University of Kansas Publications in Humanistic Studies. Online version at the Topos Text Project.
- Kerenyi, Karl (1951). The Gods of the Greeks. London, UK: Thames & Hudson. pp. 158–160.
- Lucian of Samosata (1905) Dialogues of the Gods. translated by H.W. Fowler & F.G. Fowler. Oxford, UK: The Clarendon Press. Online version at theoi.com
- Luciani Samosatensis (Lucian) (1896) Opera. Karl Jacobitz (ed). Leipzig, DE: B.G. Teubneri. Vol. I. Greek text available at the Perseus Digital Library.
- Pindar (1990) Odes translated by Diane Arnson Svarlien. Online version at the Perseus Digital Library.
- Pindar (1937) The Odes of Pindar including the Principal Fragments. translation by John Sandys. Cambridge, MA: Harvard University Press / London, UK: William Heinemann. Greek text available at the Perseus Digital Library.
- Strabo (1924) The Geography of Strabo. H.L. Jones (ed). Cambridge, MA: Harvard University Press / London, UK: William Heinemann, Ltd. Online version at the Perseus Digital Library.
- Strabo (1877) Geographica. A. Meineke (ed). Leipzig, DE: Teubner. Greek text available at the Perseus Digital Library.
- Tzetzes, J. (n.d.) [1826]. "Books IX–X". Book of Histories. Translated by Alexander, Jonathan (online ed.) – via theio.com. "from the original Greek of T. Kiessling's edition of 1826"
- Publius Vergilius Maro (Virgil) (1910) Aeneid. translated by Theodore C. Williams. Boston, MA: Houghton Mifflin Co. Online version at the Perseus Digital Library.
- Publius Vergilius Maro (Virgil) (1900) Bucolics, Aeneid, and Georgics. J.B. Greenough (ed). Boston. Ginn & Co.
  - Online translated version at the Perseus Digital Library
  - Online Latin text available at the Perseus Digital Library.
