= Elatus =

Figures in Greek mythology

There were several figures named Elatus /ˈɛlətəs/ or Élatos (Ancient Greek: Ἔλατος, lit. 'ductile' or 'malleable') in Greek mythology.

- Elatus, a son of Arcas by either Leaneira (or Laodameia), Meganeira, Chrysopeleia or Erato and the brother of Apheidas and Azan. He was allotted by Arcas the region of then-nameless Mount Cyllene as his domain, but afterwards migrated to the region which later became known as Phocis, and assisted the local inhabitants in the war against the Phlegyans; he was renowned as founder and eponym of the city Elatea. An image of him was carved on a stele in the marketplace of Elatea. He married Laodice (daughter of Cinyras) and became by her, the father of Stymphalus, Pereus, Aepytus, Ischys, and Cyllen.
- Elatus, a Lapith chieftain of Larissa, Thessaly. He was the father, by Hippeia, of Caeneus, Polyphemus, the seer Ampycus, Ischys who was beloved by Coronis, and a daughter Dotia, possibly the eponym of Dotion (Dotium) in Thessaly (see also Dotis).
- Elatus, a centaur, killed during a battle with Heracles by a poisoned arrow that passed through his arm and continued to wound Chiron in the knee.
  - The minor planet 31824 Elatus is named after this figure.
- Elatus or Elaton, a charioteer of Amphiaraus, otherwise known as Baton.
- Elatus, father of Euanippe, who was the mother of Polydorus by Hippomedon.
- Elatus, a son of Icarius and father of Taenarus by Erymede, daughter of Damasiclus. In one account, Taenarus was instead called the child of Icarius with no mention of the birth mother.
- Elatus, an ally of the Trojans from Pedasus, killed by Agamemnon.
- Elatus, one of the suitors of Penelope from Same along with other 22 wooers. He was slain by Emaeus during the assault of Odysseus.
