= Icarius =

Multiple figures in Greek mythology

In Greek mythology, there were two people named Icarius (/ɪˈkɛəriəs/; Ancient Greek: Ἰκάριος Ikários).

- Icarius, a Spartan prince, son of Perieres.
- Icarius, an Athenian who received Dionysus.

== See also ==
- Icarus, whose wings failed in flight
