= Ischys =

Lover of Coronis in Greek mythology

In Greek mythology, Ischys (Ancient Greek: Ἰσχύς, lit. 'strength') was the son of Elatus.

== Mythology ==
Ischys had an affair with the Thessalian princess Coronis, one of Apollo's lovers, who was at that time pregnant with the god's child. When a (then white) raven told Apollo of the affair between Ischys and Coronis, he became so angry that his intense glare scorched the raven black. His twin sister Artemis killed Coronis as a punishment, but the unborn child was saved at the last minute by Apollo who felt remorse for causing his lover's death. Ischys was then killed by Apollo's father Zeus or Apollo himself.

The mortal lover of Coronis was also known as Alcyoneus or Lycus.
