= Asterodia =

Name in Greek mythology

In Greek mythology, the name Asterodia, Asterodeia, or Asterodea (/æstəˈrɒdiə/; Ancient Greek: Ἀστεροδεία, Ἀστεροδία) refers to:

- Asterodia, a Caucasian nymph and one of the Oceanids as the daughter of Oceanus and Tethys, mother of Absyrtus by Aeetes.
- Asterodia, a Phocian princess, daughter of King Deion and Diomede, and sister of Aenetus, Phylacus, Actor and Cephalus. She was also called Asteria, the one who bore Crisus and Panopeus to Phocus. These twin brothers did not get along, quarreling while still in their mother's womb.
- Asterodia, one of the possible wives of Endymion.
- Asterodia, daughter of Eurypylus and one of the possible wives of Icarius.
