= Kyllini =

Kyllini, Cyllene or Kyllene (ancient Greek: Κυλλήνη) may refer to:

- Mount Kyllini, a mountain in Corinthia, Peloponnese, Greece
- Cyllene (nymph), a Greek mythological figure associated with the mountain
- Kyllini, Elis, a town in Elis, Greece
- Cyllene (Elis), a town of ancient Elis, Greece
- Kyllene (Aeolis), a town of ancient Aeolis, now in Turkey
- Kastro-Kyllini, a municipal unit in Elis, Greece
- Andravida-Kyllini, a municipality in Elis, Greece
- Cyllene (moon), a moon of Jupiter
- Cyllene (horse), a champion thoroughbred racehorse and sire
- Cyllene (gastropod), a genus of sea snails
