= Ichneutae =

Fragmentary satyr play by Sophocles

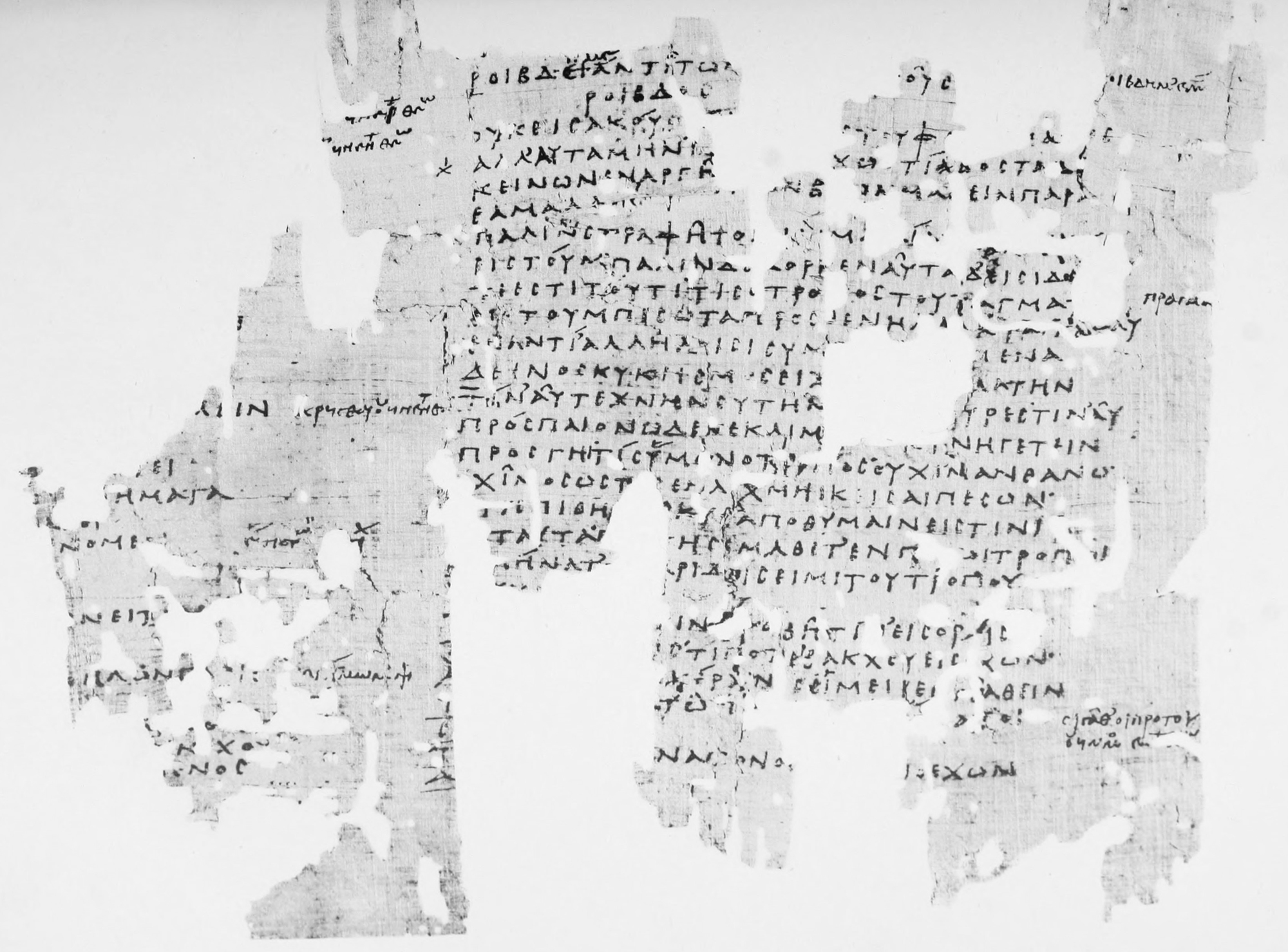
- Lines 96–138 of the Ichneutae on a fragment of the papyrus roll that provides the basis for our knowledge of the play (P.Oxy. IX 1174 col. iv–v)
- Written by: Sophocles
- Chorus: Satyrs
- Characters: Apollo; Silenus; Cyllene (oread); Hermes (not present in the extant fragments)
- Original language: Ancient Greek
- Genre: Satyr play
- Setting: Mount Cyllene in Arcadia

Premiere
- Place premiered: Athens

The Ichneutae (Ancient Greek: Ἰχνευταί, romanized: Ikhneutaí, lit. 'trackers'), also known as the Searchers, Trackers or Tracking Satyrs, is a fragmentary satyr play by the fifth-century BC Athenian dramatist Sophocles. Three undistinguished quotations in ancient authors were all that was known of the play until 1912, when the extensive remains of a second-century CE papyrus roll of the Ichneutae were published among the Oxyrhynchus Papyri. With more than four hundred lines surviving in their entirety or in part, the Ichneutae is now the best preserved ancient satyr play after Euripides' Cyclops, the only fully extant example of the genre. The manuscript is now kept in the British Library in London.

== Plot ==
The plot of the play was derived from the inset myth of the Homeric Hymn to Hermes. A newborn Hermes has stolen Apollo's cattle, and the older god sends a chorus of satyrs to retrieve the animals, promising them the dual rewards of freedom and gold should they be successful. The satyrs set out to find the cattle, tracking their footprints. Approaching the cave where baby Hermes is hiding, they hear him playing the lyre, which he has just invented. Scared by the strange sound, the satyrs debate their next move. The nymph of the mountain in which Hermes is hiding, Cyllene, explains to them the nature of the musical instrument. Outside the cave, the satyrs see some sewn cow-hides and are convinced that they have found the thief. Apollo returns as the papyrus breaks off.

== English translations ==
- The Ichneutae of Sophocles, edited and translated by Richard Johnson Walker (1919) London: Burns and Oates Ltd.
- "The Searchers" (Ιχνευται), pp. 140–177 in Sophocles, vol. 3, translated by Hugh Lloyd-Jones (1996) Loeb Classical Library Cambridge, Massachusetts: Harvard.

== Bibliography ==
- Hunt, A.S. (1912) The Oxyrhynchus Papyri: Part IX. London.
- Milne, H.J.M. (1927) Catalogue of the Literary Papyri in the British Museum. London.
- Seaford, R.A.S. (1984) The Cyclops of Euripides. Oxford.
- Antonopoulos, A.P. (2010) Sophocles' Ichneutai 1-220, edited with introduction & commentary. (diss.) Exeter.
- Antonopoulos, A.P. (2013) 'Select Notes on the Papyrus Text of Sophocles' Ichneutai (P.Oxy. IX. 1174)', ZPE 186, 77–91.
- Antonopoulos, A.P. (2014) 'Sophocles' Ichneutai 176-202: A lyric dialogue (?) featuring an impressive mimetic scene', Hermes 142, 246–254.
- Antonopoulos, A.P. (2014) 'A Puzzling Threat by Silenos: On Sophocles’ Ichneutai 168’, GRBS 54, 579-583.

== See also ==
- The Trackers of Oxyrhynchus
