= Feneos =

Feneos Φενεός
- Municipal unit
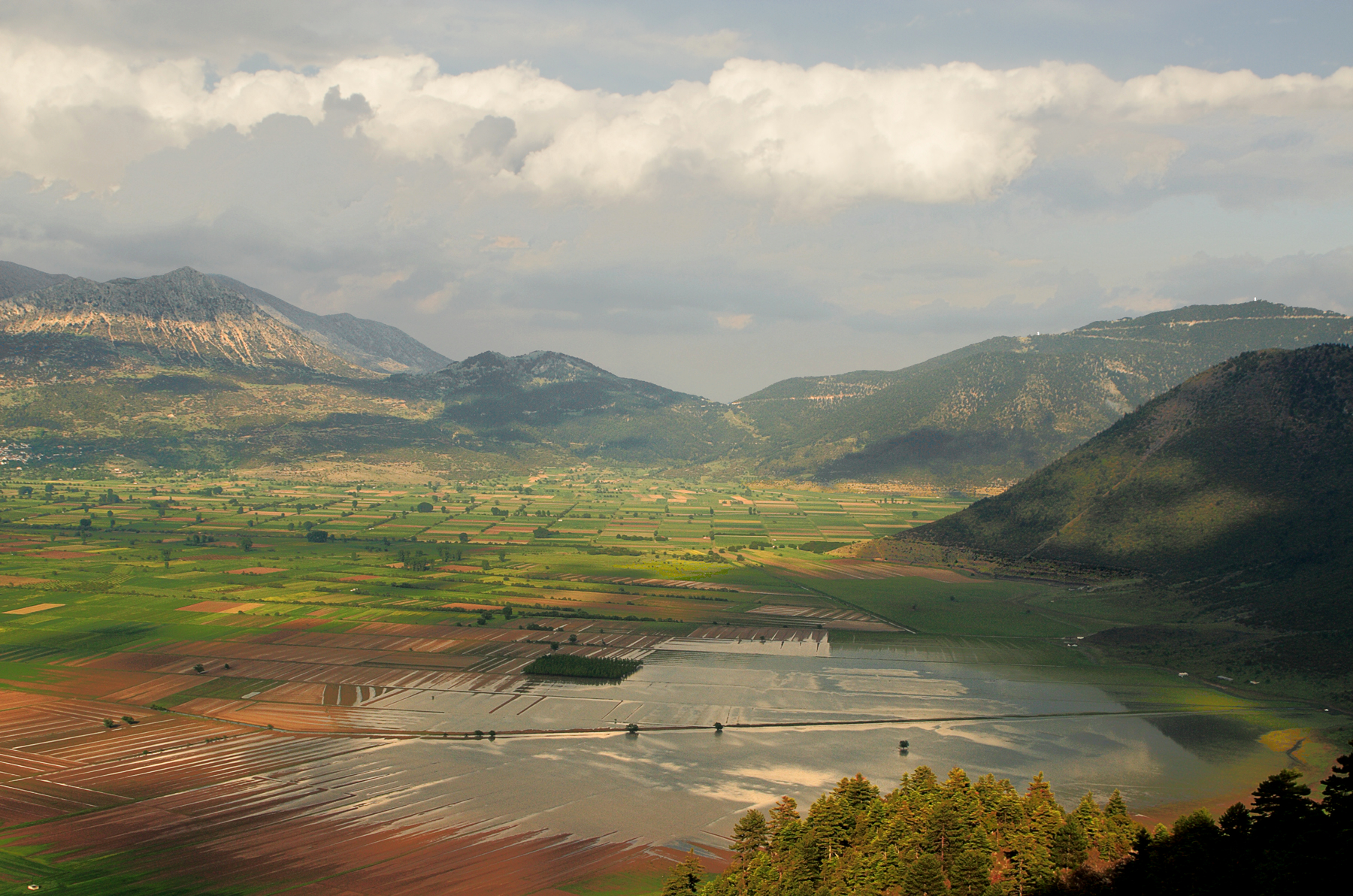
- Feneos plain showing seasonal floods.

- Location within the regional unit

- Location within Greece
- Coordinates: 37°57′N 22°19′E
- Country: Greece
- Administrative region: Peloponnese
- Regional unit: Corinthia
- Municipality: Sikyona

Area
  - Municipal unit: 226.2 km^{2} (87.3 sq mi)

Population (2021)
  - Municipal unit: 1,327
  - Municipal unit density: 5.866/km^{2} (15.19/sq mi)
  - Community: 73
- Time zone: UTC+2 (EET)
  - Summer (DST): UTC+3 (EEST)
- Postal code: 200 14
- Vehicle registration: ΚΡ

Feneos (Greek: Φενεός, Latin: Pheneus) is a village and a former municipality in Corinthia, Peloponnese, Greece. Since the 2011 local government reform it is part of the municipality Sikyona, of which it is a municipal unit. The municipal unit has an area of 226.201 km^{2}. Its population was 1,327 in 2021. The seat of the municipality was in Goura. The name comes from the ancient city of Pheneus.

== History ==
In ancient times the area was considered part of Arcadia. Herodotus stated that the river Styx arises near Feneos. Feneos lies at the foot of Mount Cyllene, mythical birthplace of the god Hermes. It therefore served as an important cult centre for the god, notably during the annual festival of the Hermaea. Catullus (Poem 68) mentions the seasonal flooding of the plain and says it was drained by an underground channel dug by Hercules during his Twelve Labors.

In the Aeneid, Evander's fond memories of a visit by Aeneas' father Anchises to Feneos are one factor in his decision to ally his Arcadian colonists to the Trojans.

During the Greek Civil War, Communist guerillas turned the nearby monastery of St. George into a concentration camp and killing ground for those they deemed "reactionaries". The concentration camp was well-organized for mass killings, with 6-7 resident killers that worked round the clock in busy times. It is believed that hundreds were killed.
