= Palaestra (mythology) =

Figure in Greek mythology

Greek mythology associates the name Palaestra (Ancient Greek: Παλαίστρα) with two separate characters, both associated with the god Hermes: one became a mortal lover of Hermes, whereas the other was considered his daughter and a goddess of wrestling. Myths concerning both provided an etiology for the Greek word for a wrestling school: palaestra.

== Palaestra, lover of Hermes ==
According to a story recorded by Servius, Palaestra was a daughter of the Arcadian king Choricius, and sister to Plexippus and Enetus. Her two brothers would wrestle each other, and their father, finding the sight of them wrestling to be of aesthetic value, made it into a sports game. Palaestra told about this to her lover Hermes; he liked the new game even more and, after making some improvements, introduced it to all people. Plexippus and Enetus learned from Palaestra that their invention had been divulged and reported the matter to Choricus. He got angry at his sons and ordered them to punish the thief. They found Hermes sleeping on a mountain and dismembered him, from which circumstance the mountain was believed to have been named Cyllene (a folk etymology based on the Greek κυλλός kyllos "crippled"), and the hermae had no arms. Hermes complained about this to Zeus and eventually had Choricus eviscerated and his remains collected in a bag. Still wishing to commemorate Palaestra, he made her name refer to the art of wrestling.

There was also an alternate version, found in the Etymologicum Magnum: according to it Palaestra was the daughter of Pandocus, a man who lived at the crossroads of three paths and would kill all the passers-by until Hermes paid him a visit and suffocated him at the instigation of Palaestra. Two folk etymologies were based on this tale: one that derived the word πάλη palē "wrestling" from the name of Palaestra, and the other that considered the word πανδοκεία pandokeia "act or habit of welcoming every guest" to come from the name of Pandocus.

== Palaestra, daughter of Hermes ==
According to Philostratus the Elder, Palaestra, a daughter of Hermes, was believed to have grown up in Arcadia, which connected her with Olympia and the Olympian Games. She was credited with inventing the art of wrestling for men to entertain themselves during the times of peace. Palaestra herself was seen as a skilled wrestler with androgynous looks and boyish ways, as is evident from the extended physical description of her by Philostratus:

The figure of Palaistra, if it be compared with a boy, will be that of a girl; but if it be taken for a girl, it will seem to be a boy. For her hair is too short even to be twisted into a knot; the eye might be that of either sex; and the brow indicates disdain for both lovers and wrestlers; for she claims that she is able to resist both the one and the other and that not even in a wrestling bout could anyone touch her breasts, so much does she excel in the art. And the breasts themselves, as in a boy of tender years, show but slight signs of beginning fullness. She cares for nothing feminine; hence she does not even wish to have white arms, and apparently even disapproves of the Dryades because they stay in the shade to keep their skin fair; nay, as one who lives in the vales of Arkadia, she begs Helios (the Sun) for colour, and he brings it to her like a flower and reddens the girl with moderate heat.
