= Bounos =

Son of Hermes and Alcidamia

In Greek mythology, Bounos or Bunus (Ancient Greek: Βοῦνος means 'hill, mound') was the Corinthian son of Hermes and Alcidamea/Alcidamia.

== Mythology ==
Bunus received the throne of Ephyra (an early name of Corinth) from Aeëtes, when the latter decided to migrate to Colchis, biding him to keep it until he or his children came back. He is said to have built a sanctuary to Hera Bunaea on the road which led up to Acrocorinthus. After the death of Bounus, Epopeus of Sicyon, who had come from Thessaly, extended his own kingdom to include Corinth.
