= Pherespondus =

In Greek mythology, Pherespondus (Ancient Greek: Φερέσπονδος) was the satyr herald of Dionysus during the Indian War.

== Family ==
In secret union, Hermes fathered him, Lycus and Pronomus to Iphthime, daughter of Dorus.

== Mythology ==
Eiraphiotes (i.e. Dionysus) entrusted to the three satyr brothers the dignity of the staff of the heavenly herald which their father was the source of wisdom.

Pherespondus was ordered by Dionysus to be bear the message to Deriades to surrender or to fight the god.

"He summoned Pherespondos,' one swift like the wind, the offspring of the heavenly herald, the clever son of Iphthime, and greeted him with friendly words: Son of Hermaon, herald that I love, go take this message to proud Deriades: 'Prince, accept the gifts of Lyaios without war, or fight against Bromios and you shall be like Orontes!' So he spoke, and the herald on swift shoes holding his father's rod travelled from land to land, until he made his way to the Eastern country."
