= Pronomus =

People in Greek mythology

In Greek mythology, Pronomus or Pronomos (Ancient Greek: Πρόνομος, lit. 'grazing forward') may refer to two characters:

- Pronomus, the "intelligent" satyr herald of Dionysus during the Indian War. In secret union, Hermes fathered him, Pherespondus and Lycus to Iphthime, daughter of Dorus. Eiraphiotes (i.e. Dionysus) entrusted to these three satyr brothers the dignity of the staff of the heavenly herald which their father was the source of wisdom.
- Pronomus, from Zacynthus island, one of the suitors of Penelope along with forty-three other wooers. Upon returning from Ithaca, Odysseus shot down all the suitors including Pronomus with the help of Eumaeus, Philoetius, and Telemachus.
- Pronomus, a Giant who tried to force Hera to marry him and was then killed by Heracles, who received godhood as a reward for his service.

There is also the Pronomos Painter, known for the Pronomos Vase, now in Naples, which shows actors after a performance.
