= Mount Kyllini =

Mountain in Greece

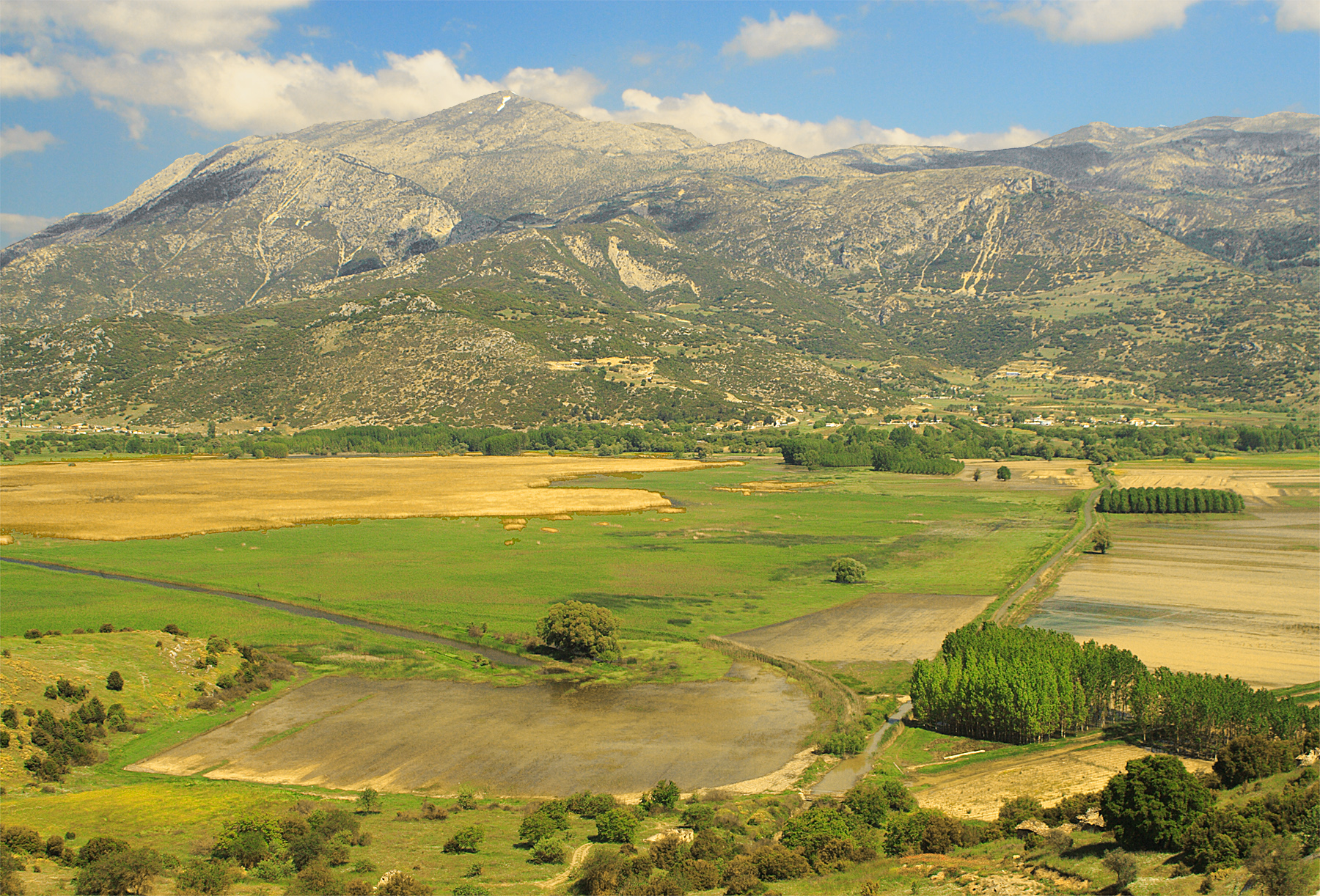
- Mount Kyllini as seen from Stymfalia

Highest point
- Elevation: 2,376 m (7,795 ft)
- Prominence: 1,870 m (6,140 ft)
- Listing: Ultra
- Coordinates: 37°56′23″N 22°23′49″E

Geography
- Location within Greece
- Location: Western Corinthia, Greece

Climbing
- Easiest route: YDS class 2

Mount Kyllini or Mount Cyllene (/sɪˈliːniː/; Ancient Greek: Κυλλήνη [kylˈlːɛːnɛː], Modern Greek: [ciˈlini]), also known as Mount Ziria (Ζήρια, Modern Greek: [ˈzirja]), is a mountain on the Peloponnese in Greece famous for its association with the god Hermes. It rises to 2,376 m (7,795 ft) above sea level, making it the second highest point on the peninsula. It is located near the border between the historic regions of Arcadia and Achaea—in the northeast of Arcadia, and entirely within modern Corinthia. It is located west of Corinth , northwest of Stymfalia, north of Tripoli, and south of Derveni. Several modern places are also named Kyllini.

== Description ==
Much of the mountain is barren and rocky, although the area below 2,000 metres (6,600 ft) is largely forested. There is an observatory at 908 metres (2,979 ft), at 22.67 east longitude and 37.97 north latitude. From the top a large portion of northeastern Peloponnesus is visible, including the eastern part of Achaia and Chelmos, the Gulf of Corinth and most of Corinthia, the southern part of Corinthia and parts of northeastern Arcadia. The nearest mountain ranges are Oligyrtos to the south and Chelmos/Aroania to the west. Roads pass near the southern and western slopes, but there are not many on the mountain itself, as much of the mountain is part of a park. The municipal boundary of Stymfalia–Feneos–Evrostini and Xylokastro passes through the mountain.

== Mythology ==
Cyllene (or Kyllene) herself was a mountain nymph who had taken for her consort Pelasges in the most ancient times recounted by Greek mythographers. There was a port in Elis in antiquity named Cyllene near the mouth of the Alfeios, where the traveler Pausanias noted the image of Hermes, "most devoutly worshiped by the inhabitants, is merely the male member upright on the pedestal."

In Greek mythology, Hermes was born in a sacred cave on the mountain, and so Cyllenius is a frequent epithet of his. The Homeric Hymn Hymn to Pan recalled that "Hermes ... came to Arkadia ... there where his sacred place is as god of Kyllene. For there, though a god, he used to tend curly-fleeced sheep." In ancient times there was a temple and statue dedicated to him on the mountain's summit, which by the time of Pausanias had fallen into ruins:

The highest mountain in Arkadia is Kyllene, on the top of which is a dilapidated temple of Hermes Kyllenios (of Mt Kyllene). It is clear that Kyllenos, the son of Elatos, gave the mountain its name and the god his surname. In days of old, men made wooden images, so far as I have been able to discover, from the following trees ebony, cypress, cedar, oak, yew, lotus. But the image of Hermes Kyllenios is made of none of these, but of juniper wood. Its height, I conjecture, is about eight feet.

This temple was said to be of the oldest temples ever built:

Those who first built temples to the gods . . . Lycaon [the mythical first king of Arkadia], son of Pelasgus, built a temple [the first] to Mercurius [Hermes] of Cyllene in Arcadia.

The Pleiades were born on Mount Kyllini. Gaius Julius Hyginus records that it was on Cyllene that the seer Tiresias changed sex when he struck two copulating snakes.

== Nearest places ==
- Feneos, west
- Kastania (Mt Cnacalus), 1,000 m
- Kessari, southeast
- Goura, southwest
