= Goura, Corinthia =

Village in the Peloponnese, Greece

Goura Γκούρα
- Community
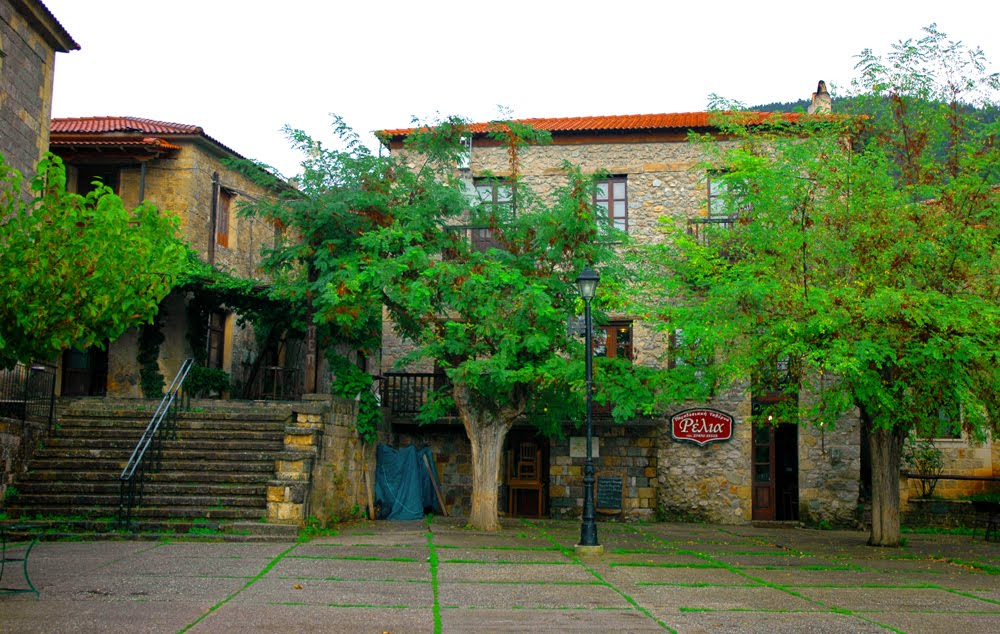
- Goura's main square

- Location within Greece
- Country: Greece
- Administrative region: Peloponnese
- Regional unit: Corinthia
- Municipality: Sikyona
- Municipal unit: Feneos
- Elevation: 956 m (3,136 ft)

Population (2021)
  - Community: 233
- Time zone: UTC+2 (EET)
  - Summer (DST): UTC+3 (EEST)
- Area code: 200 14
- Vehicle registration: ΚΡ

Goura (Greek: Γκούρα) is a settlement in Corinthia, Greece. It is located at an altitude of 950 metres on the western slopes of Mount Zireia in the valley of the river Olvios, 91 kilometres south-west of Corinth. The village is named after the hero of the Greek War of Independence, Nikolaos Oikonomou-Gouras. His house, along with those of fellow-fighters Sarlis and Mourtis, still stands.
