= Cyllene (nymph) =

Arcadian nymph in Greek mythology

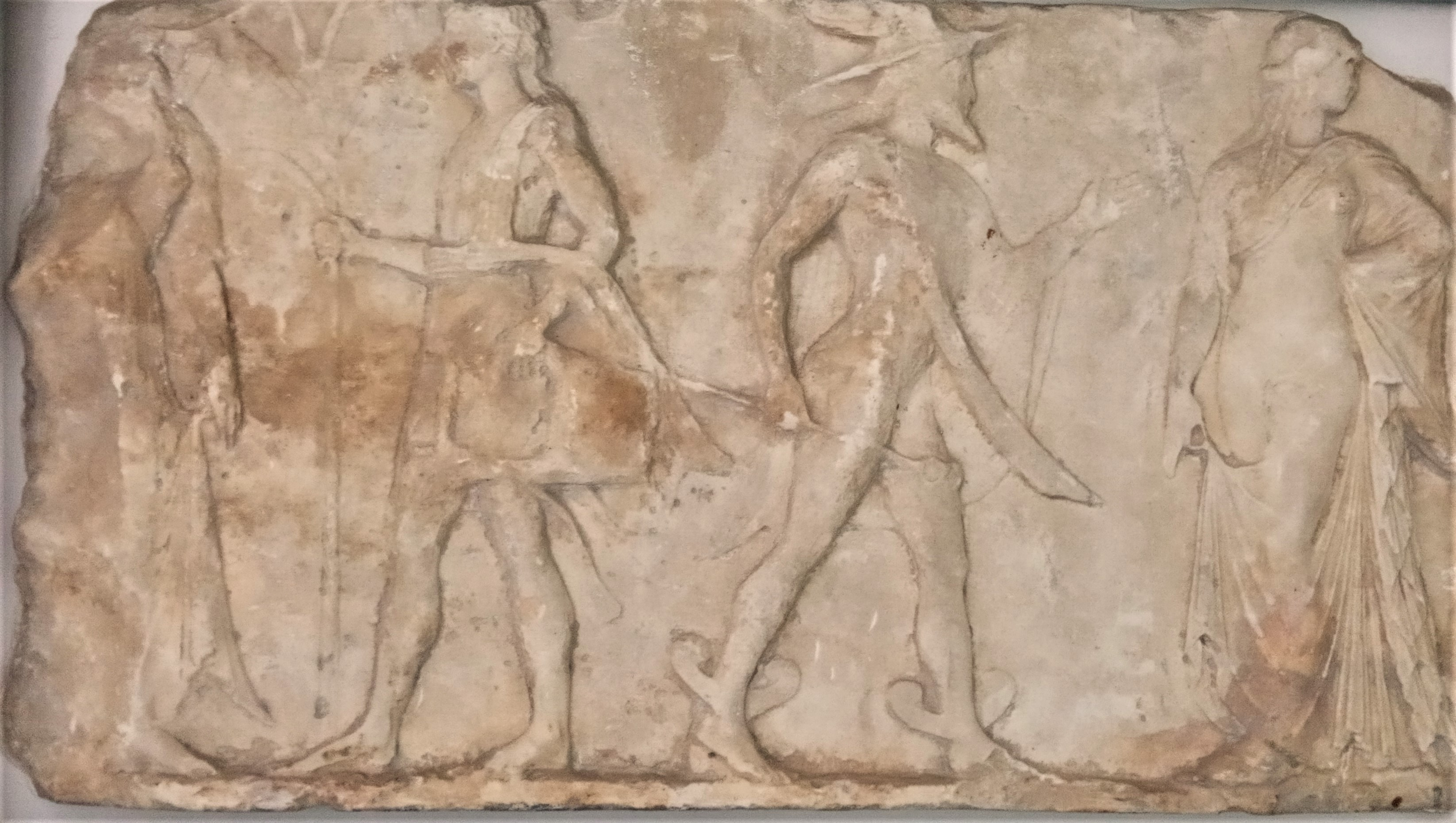
Marble relief with Artemis, Apollo, Hermes and Cyllene, Odesa Archaeological Museum.

In Greek mythology, Cyllene (/saɪˈliːniː/; Ancient Greek: Κυλλήνη, romanized: Kullḗnē or Kyllênê, lit. 'twisted queen' pronounced [kyllɛ̌ːnɛ]), also spelled Kyllene (/kaɪˈliːniː/), is the Naiad nymph and the personification of Mount Cyllene in Arcadia, the region in Greece where the god of travellers and shepherds Hermes was born and brought up. In some versions Cyllene is said to have been Hermes' nurse and caretaker while he was growing up. Cyllene's most prominent appearance in ancient Greek literature is in Ichneutae, a now lost satyr play by Sophocles.

== Family ==
Cyllene is described as a Naiad nymph, a type of water spirit, perhaps the daughter of a Peloponnesian river-god.

According to Pseudo-Apollodorus, Cyllene and Pelasgus had a son named Lycaon, a king of the Arcadians. Otherwise, the latter's mother was either the Oceanid Meliboea or Deianira, daughter of another Lycaon. According to others she was Lycaon's wife instead, but in others versions of the myth, his wife was called Nonacris, eponym of the Arcadian town of Nonacris.

== Mythology ==
The ancient Greeks considered Mount Cyllene, the mountain this nymph personified, to be the highest mountain range in the Peloponnese peninsula, and was sacred to Hermes who was worshipped there under the localised epithet Cyllenius.

According to the Homeric Hymn to Hermes, the newborn Hermes stayed in a cave with his mother the Pleiad nymph Maia, but in Sophocles's lost satyr play Ichneutae ("the trackers") it was Cyllene who nurtured the infant god. The titular satyrs, who are looking for Apollo's missing cattle (that Hermes stole) on the orders of the god, confront Cyllene who gives first an account of Zeus and Maia's amorous relationship, how he deceived his wife Queen Hera in order to meet Maia and how quickly their infant is growing, scaring even her.

As the sound of the lyre echoes, the satyrs marvel at the melody, and Cyllene explains to them the construction of the instrument, leaving them baffled and incredulous. Cyllene, when describing the lyre Hermes invented, offers a humorous riddle, saying that the son of Zeus has granted a new voice to a body that is dead, before revealing she is talking about a dead tortoise that Hermes fashioned into a lyre. The satyrs next accuse Hermes of stealing Apollo's sacred cattle; Cyllene replies that it is unthinkable to accuse a son of Zeus himself of such a petty crime, and defends Hermes by pointing out there is no tendency for theft in either the paternal or maternal side of Hermes' family. (Note: However Cyllene here forgets to account for Prometheus, Maia's uncle (and thus Hermes' great-uncle) who stole fire from the gods.) The papyrus on which the fragmentary play is preserved breaks off as Apollo arrives at the scene, and so what happens next is not clear.

== In contemporary culture ==
One of planet Jupiter's moons has been named Cyllene after the nymph.

== See also ==
- Chiron
- Tethys
- Kourotrophos
- Pan
