= Kyllene (Aeolis) =

Ancient port settlement

Coordinates: 38°44′43″N 26°49′55″E

Kyllene (Ancient Greek: Κυλλήνη), also known as Ascanius Portus, was a port town of ancient Aeolis.

Its site is tentatively located near Yenifoça, Asiatic Turkey.
