= Cyllene (Elis) =

Seaport town of ancient Elis

Coordinates: 37°56′05″N 21°08′42″E

Cyllene or Kyllene (Ancient Greek: Κυλλήνη) was a seaport town of ancient Elis, distant 120 stadia from the city of Elis. Cyllene was an ancient place. It is mentioned by Homer as one of the towns of the Epeians; and if we are to believe Dionysius Periegetes, it was the port from which the Pelasgians sailed to Italy. Pausanias, moreover, mentions it as visited at an early period by the merchants of Aegina, and as the port from which the exiled Messenians after the conclusion of the Second Messenian War, sailed away to found a colony in Italy or Sicily.

Cyllene was burnt by the Corcyraeans in 435 BCE, because it had supplied ships to the Corinthians. It is again mentioned in 429 BCE, as the naval station of the Peloponnesian fleet during the Peloponnesian War, when Phormion commanded an Athenian squadron in the Corinthian Gulf. Its name occurs on other occasions, clearly showing that it was the principal port in this part of Peloponnesus. Strabo describes Cyllene as an inconsiderable village, having an ivory statue of Asclepius by Colotes, a contemporary of Pheidias. This statue is not mentioned by Pausanias, who speaks, however, of temples of Asclepius, Aphrodite, and the most venerated, one of Hermes having a Herma (with a carved phallus).

It is located within the bounds of modern Kyllini, named after the ancient town.
