= Hermes =

Ancient Greek deity

- God of boundaries, roads, travelers, merchants, thieves, athletes, shepherds, commerce, speed, cunning, language, oratory, wit, and messages
- Member of the Twelve Olympians
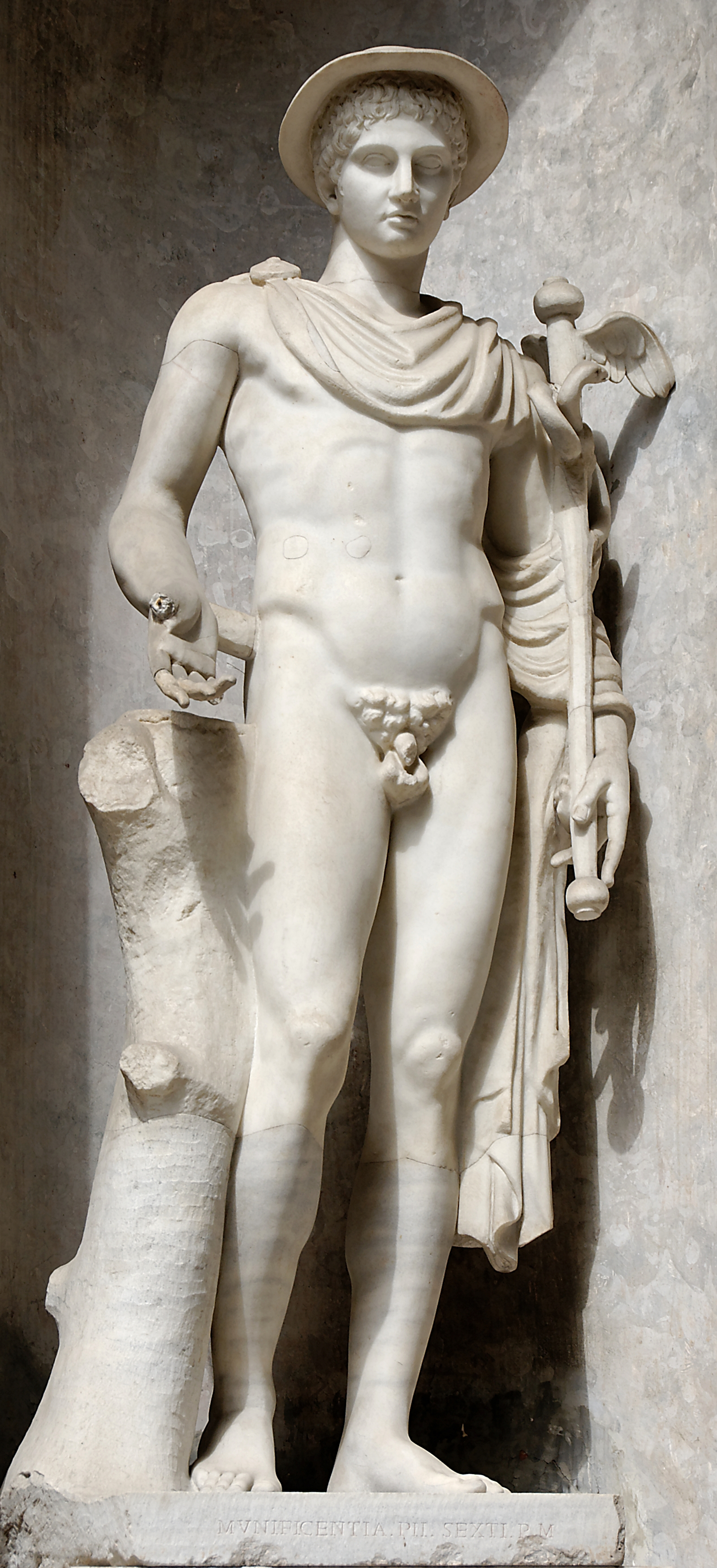
- Hermes Ingenui (Vatican Museums), Roman copy of the second century BC after a Greek original of the 5th century BC. Hermes has a kerykeion (caduceus), kithara, petasos (round hat) and a traveler's cloak.
- Abode: Mount Olympus
- Planet: Mercury
- Symbol: Talaria, caduceus, tortoise, lyre, rooster, Petasos (winged helmet)
- Day: Wednesday (hēméra Hermoû)

Genealogy
- Parents: Zeus and Maia
- Siblings: Several paternal half-siblings

Equivalents
- Etruscan: Turms
- Roman: Mercury
- Egyptian: Thoth or Anubis

Hermes (/ˈhɜːrmiːz/; Ancient Greek: Ἑρμῆς) is an Olympian deity in ancient Greek religion and mythology considered the herald of the gods. He is also widely considered the protector of human heralds, travelers, thieves, merchants, and orators. He is able to move quickly and freely between the worlds of the mortal and the divine aided by his winged sandals. Hermes plays the role of the psychopomp or "soul guide"—a conductor of souls into the afterlife.

In myth, Hermes functions as the emissary and messenger of the gods, and is often presented as the son of Zeus and Maia, the Pleiad. He is regarded as "the divine trickster", about which the Homeric Hymn to Hermes offers the most well-known account.

Hermes's attributes and symbols include the herma, the rooster, the tortoise, satchel or pouch, talaria (winged sandals), and winged helmet or simple petasos, as well as the palm tree, goat, the number four, several kinds of fish, and incense. However, his main symbol is the caduceus, a winged staff intertwined with two snakes copulating and carvings of the other gods.

In Roman mythology and religion many of Hermes's characteristics belong to Mercury, a name derived from the Latin merx, meaning "merchandise", and the origin of the words "merchant" and "commerce."

== Name and origin ==
The earliest form of the name Hermes (Ἑρμῆς) is the Mycenaean Greek *hermāhās, written 𐀁𐀔𐁀 e-ma-a_{2} (e-ma-ha) in the Linear B syllabic script. Other forms of the name are Hermeías (Ἑρμείας, Epic Greek), Hermáōn (Ἑρμάων), Hermâs (Ἑρμᾶς, Boeotian and Doric Greek), Hermáōn (Ἑρμάων, Hesiodus), Hermán (Ἑρμάν, Laconic, Arcadian Greek etc.), Hérmaios (Ἓρμαιος), and Hérmaiuos (Ἓρμαιυος). Hermes has long been derived from Greek ἕρμα (herma 'stone heap, cairn'), but this scholarly speculation is also disputed.

The etymology of ἕρμα (hérma) itself is unclear. It can be connected to several Proto-Indo-European roots, denoting either "protrusions" (*wers-), "poles" (*swer-) or "heavyness" (*swer-). R. S. P. Beekes rejects the connection with hérma and suggests a Pre-Greek origin to the God's name.

Other scholars have suggested that Hermes may be a cognate of the Vedic Sarama whose name could mean 'the Runner'.

Hermes may well have been a pre-Hellenic god, but the exact origins of his Hellenic worship remain as unclear as the nature of those other gods and their worship, whose "heir" he is said to be. In 1916, Arthur Frothingham thought the god to have existed as a Mesopotamian snake-god, similar or identical to Ningishzida, a god who served as mediator between humans and the divine, especially Ishtar, and who was depicted in art as a caduceus.

Angelo (1997) thinks Hermes to be based on the Thoth archetype. Still the absorbing ("combining") of the attributes of Hermes to Thoth developed after the time of Homer amongst Greeks and Romans; Herodotus was the first to identify the Greek god with the Egyptian writing about Hermopolis. Plutarch and Diodorus also did so, but Plato thought the gods were dissimilar (Friedlander 1992).

His cult was established in Greece in remote regions, likely making him originally a god of nature, farmers, and shepherds. It is also possible that since the beginning he has been a deity with shamanic attributes linked to divination, reconciliation, magic, sacrifices, and initiation and contact with other planes of existence, a role of mediator between the worlds of the visible and invisible. According to a theory that has received considerable scholarly acceptance, Hermes originated as a form of the god Pan, who has been identified as a reflex of the Proto-Indo-European pastoral god *Péh_{2}usōn, in his aspect as the god of boundary markers (herma). The PIE root *peh_{2} 'protect' also shows up in Latin pastor 'shepherd' (whence the English pastoral). A zero grade of the full PIE form (*ph_{2}usōn) yields the name of the Sanskrit psychopomp Pushan, who, like Pan, is associated with goats. Hermes might have been an epithet of this (proposed) Indo-European god. Later, the epithet supplanted the original name itself and Hermes took over the role of psychopomp as god of messengers, travelers, and boundaries, which had originally belonged to Pan, while Pan himself continued to be venerated by his original name in his more rustic aspect as the god of the wild in the relatively isolated mountainous region of Arcadia. In later myths, after the cult of Pan was reintroduced to Attica, Pan was said to be Hermes's son.

== Iconography ==
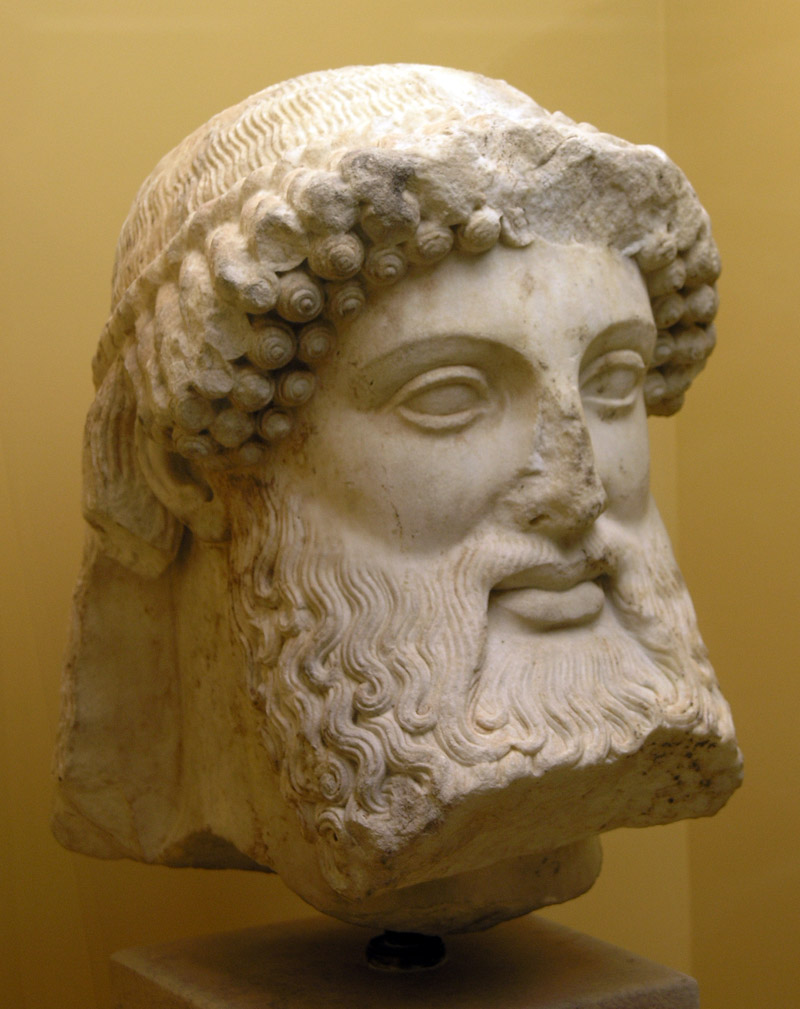
Archaic bearded Hermes from a herm, early 5th century BC

The image of Hermes evolved and varied along with Greek art and culture. In Archaic Greece he was usually depicted as a matured and bearded man, who dressed as a traveler, herald, or shepherd. This image remained common on the Hermai, which served as boundary markers, roadside markers, and grave markers, as well as votive offerings.

Homer described Hermes as a youth with the first down on his upper lip, while the 2nd-century satirist Lucian noted the down on his cheeks.

In Classical and Hellenistic Greece, Hermes was usually depicted as a young, athletic man lacking a beard. When represented as Logios (Greek: Λόγιος, speaker), his attitude is consistent with the attribute. Hermes Ludovisi by Phidias or Myron possibly represent beardless Hermes Logios. Praxiteles showed him with the baby Dionysus in his arms.

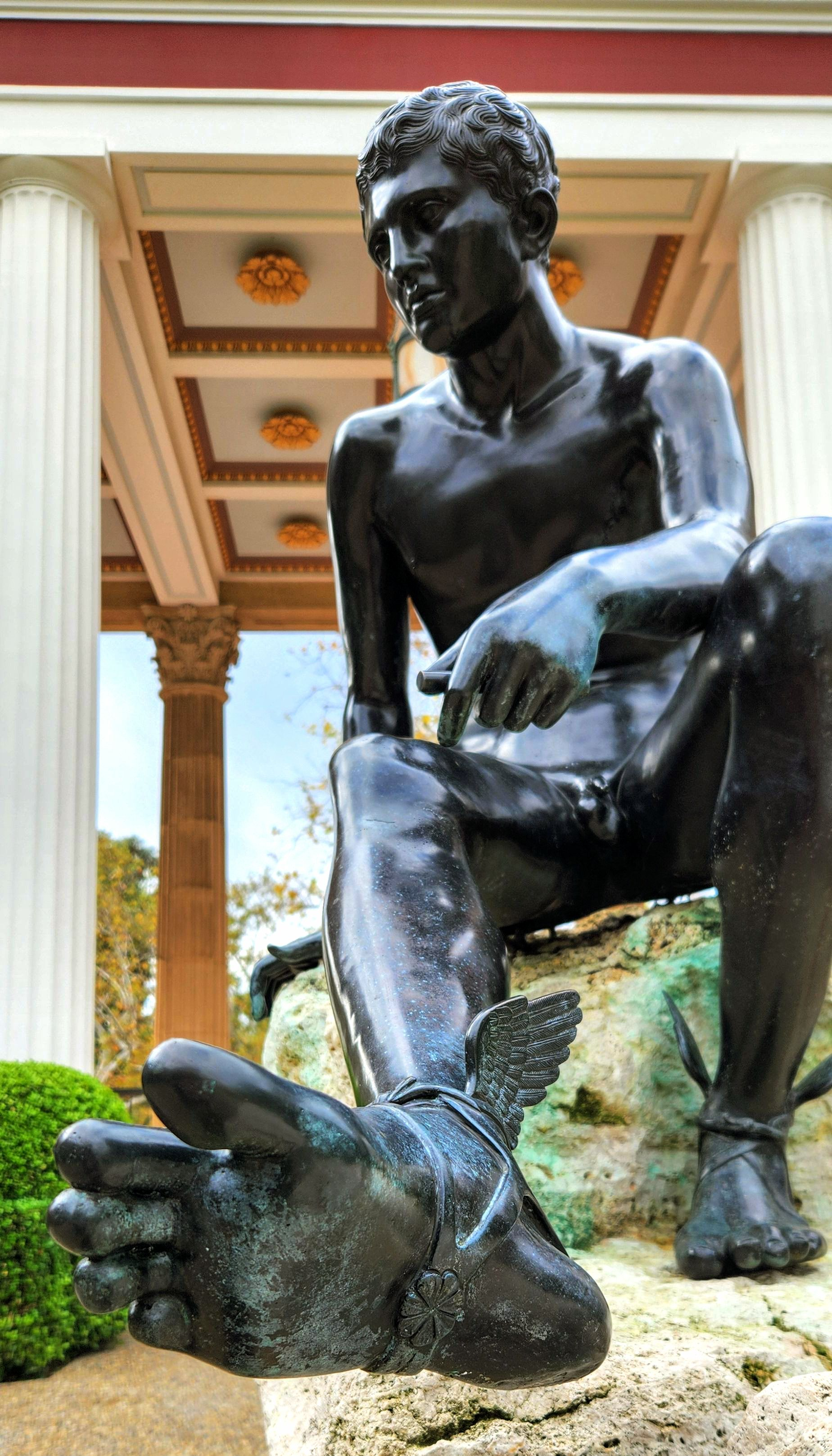
Hermes's winged sandals are evident in this Getty Villa copy of a Roman bronze recovered from the Villa of the Papyri, Herculaneum, Naples

At all times, however, through the Hellenistic periods, Roman, and throughout Western history into the present day, several of his characteristic objects are present as identification, but not always all together. Among these objects is a wide-brimmed hat, the petasos, widely used by rural people of antiquity to protect themselves from the sun, and that in later times was adorned with a pair of small wings; sometimes this hat is not present, and may have been replaced with wings rising from the hair.

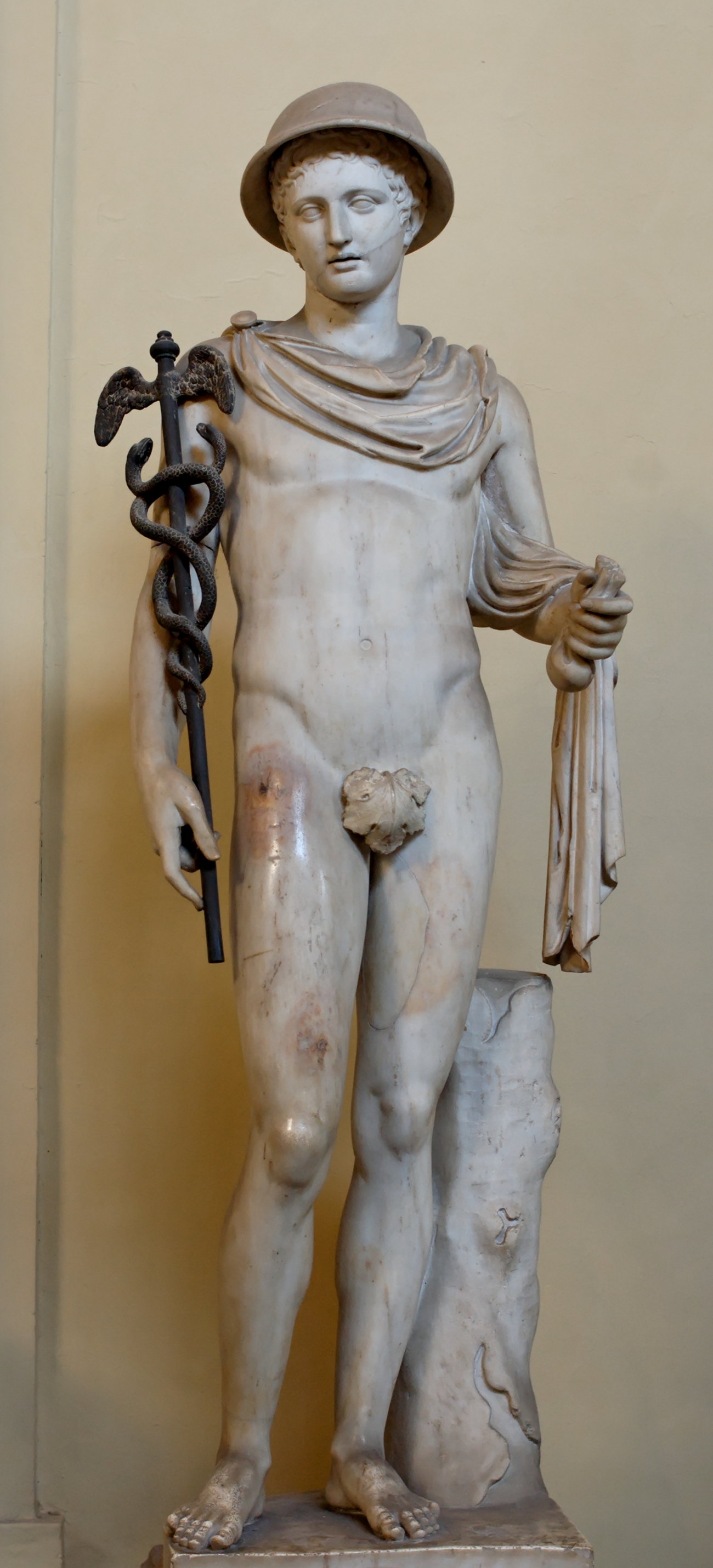
Statue of Hermes wearing the petasos and a voyager's cloak, and carrying the caduceus and a purse; Roman copy after a Greek original (Vatican Museums)

Another object is the caduceus, a staff with two intertwined snakes, sometimes crowned with a pair of wings and a sphere. The caduceus, historically, appeared with Hermes, and is documented among the Babylonians from about 3500 BC. Two snakes coiled around a staff was also a symbol of the god Ningishzida, who, like Hermes, served as a mediator between humans and the divine (specifically, the goddess Ishtar or the supreme Ningirsu). In Greece, other gods have been depicted holding a caduceus, but it was mainly associated with Hermes. It was said to have the power to make people fall asleep or wake up, and also made peace between litigants, and is a visible sign of his authority, being used as a sceptre. A similar-appearing but distinct symbol is the Rod of Asclepius, associated with the patron of medicine and son of Apollo, Asclepius, which bears only one snake. The Rod of Asclepius, occasionally conflated with the caduceus in modern times, is used by most Western physicians as a badge of their profession. After the Renaissance, the caduceus also appeared in the heraldic crests of several, and currently is a symbol of commerce.

Hermes's sandals, called pédila by the Greeks and talaria by the Romans, were made of palm and myrtle branches but were described as beautiful, golden and immortal, made by sublime art, able to take the roads with the speed of wind. Originally, they had no wings, but late in the artistic representations, they are depicted. In certain images, the wings spring directly from the ankles. Hermes has also been depicted with a purse or a bag in his hands, wearing a robe or cloak, which had the power to confer invisibility. His weapon was a harpe, which killed Argos; it was also lent to Perseus to kill Medusa and Cetus.

== Functions ==
Hermes began as a god with strong chthonic, or underworld, associations. He was a psychopomp, leader of souls along the road between "the Under and the Upper world". This function gradually expanded to encompass roads in general, and from there to boundaries, travelers, sailors, commerce, and travel itself. Hermes also in time became a figure associated with literary creation, rhetoric and story-telling.

=== As a chthonic and fertility god ===
Beginning with the earliest records of his worship, Hermes has been understood as a chthonic deity (heavily associated with the earth or underworld). As a chthonic deity, the worship of Hermes also included an aspect relating to fertility, with the phallus being included among his major symbols. The inclusion of phallic imagery associated with Hermes and placed, in the form of herma, at the entrances to households may reflect a belief in ancient times that Hermes was a symbol of the household's fertility, specifically the potency of the male head of the household in producing children.

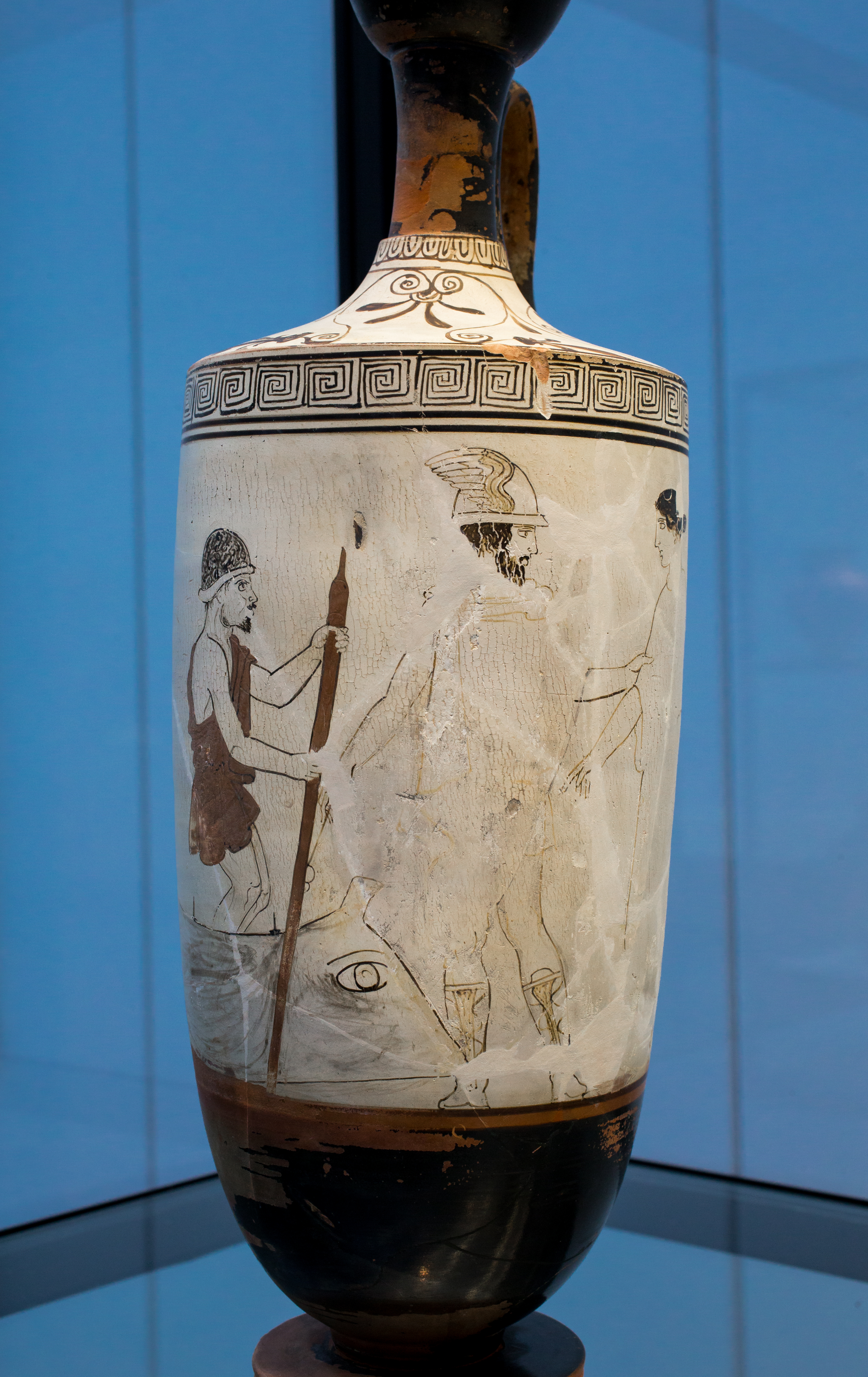
Charon with punt pole standing in his boat, receiving Hermes psychopompos who leads a deceased woman. Thanatos Painter, ca. 430 BC

The association between Hermes and the underworld is related to his function as a god of boundaries (the boundary between life and death), but he is considered a psychopomp, a deity who helps guide souls of the deceased to the afterlife, and his image was commonly depicted on gravestones in classical Greece.

=== As a god of boundaries ===
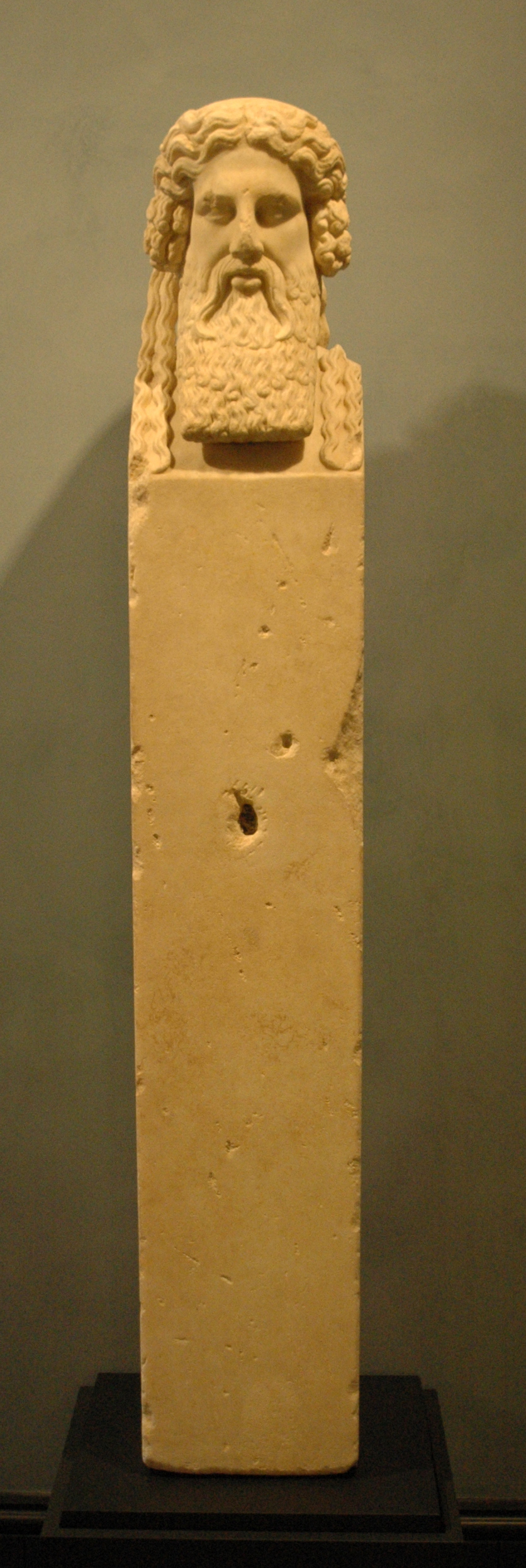
Herm of Hermes; Roman copy from the Hermes Propyleia of Alcamenes, 50–100 AD

In Ancient Greece, Hermes was a phallic god of boundaries. His name, in the form herma, was applied to a wayside marker pile of stones, and each traveler added a stone to the pile. In the 6th century BC, Hipparchus, the son of Pisistratus, replaced the cairns that marked the midway point between each village deme at the central agora of Athens with a square or rectangular pillar of stone or bronze topped by a bust of a bearded Hermes. An erect phallus rose from the base. In the more primitive Mount Kyllini or Cyllenian herms, the standing stone or wooden pillar was simply a carved phallus. "That a monument of this kind could be transformed into an Olympian god is astounding," Walter Burkert remarked. In Athens, herms were placed outside houses, both as a form of protection for the home, a symbol of male fertility, and as a link between the household and its gods with the gods of the wider community.

In 415 BC, on the night when the Athenian fleet was about to set sail for Syracuse during the Peloponnesian War, all of the Athenian hermai were vandalized. The Athenians at the time believed it was the work of saboteurs, either from Syracuse or from the anti-war faction within Athens itself. Socrates's pupil Alcibiades was suspected of involvement, and one of the charges eventually made against Socrates, which led to his execution 16 years later, was that he had either corrupted Alcibiades or failed to guide him away from his moral corruption.

=== As a messenger god ===
In association with his role as a psychopomp and god who is able to cross boundaries easily, Hermes is predominantly worshipped as a messenger, and often described as the messenger of the gods (since he can convey messages between the divine realms, the underworld, and the world of mortals). As a messenger and divine herald, he wears winged sandals (or, in Roman art influenced by Etruscan depictions of Turms, a winged cap).

=== As a shepherd god ===
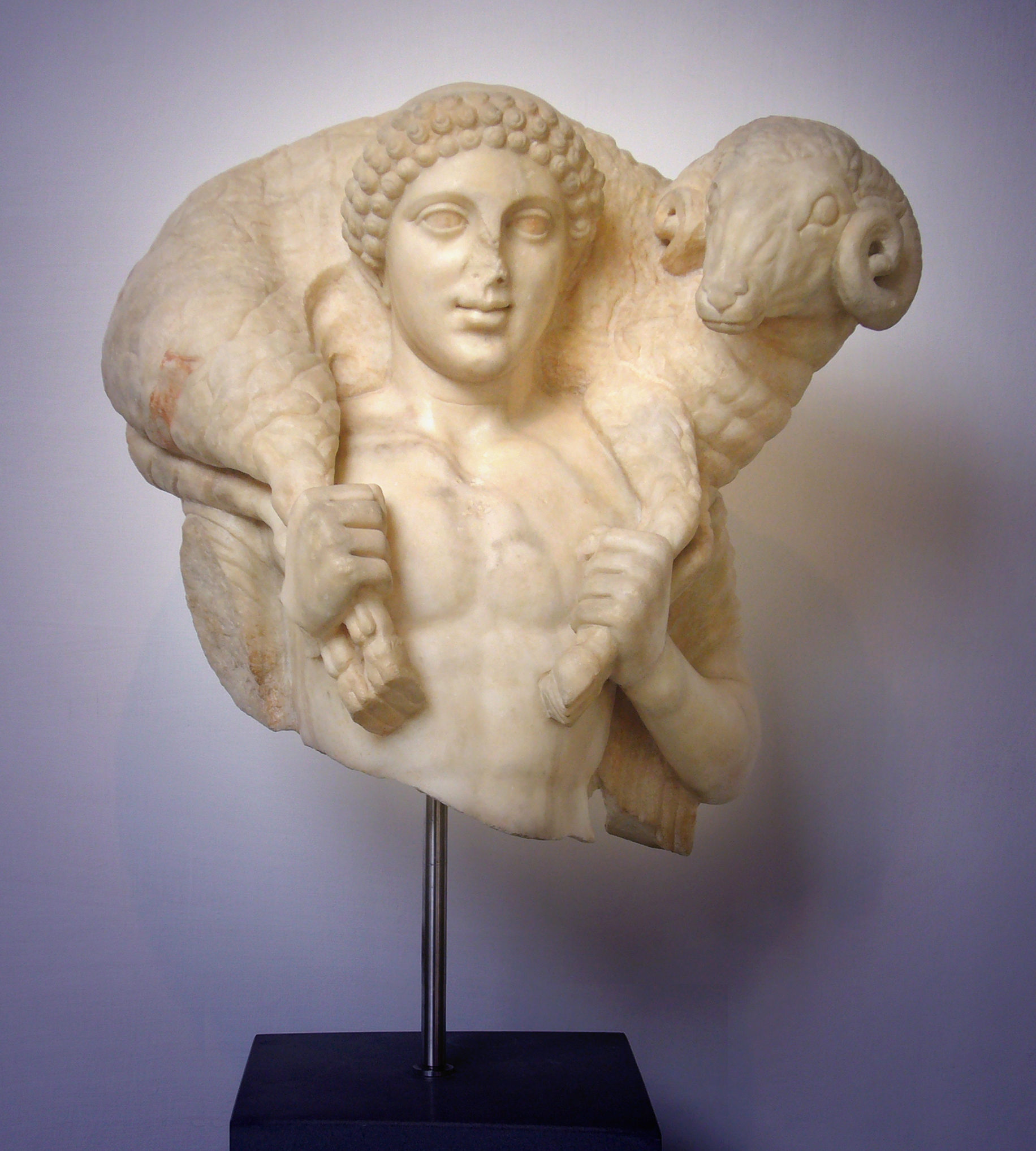
Kriophoros Hermes (which takes the lamb), late-Roman copy of Greek original from the 5th century BC. Barracco Museum, Rome

Hermes was known as the patron god of flocks, herds, and shepherds, an attribute possibly tied to his early origin as an aspect of Pan. In Boeotia, Hermes was worshiped for saving the town from a plague by carrying a ram or calf around the city walls. A yearly festival commemorated this event, during which a lamb would be carried around the city by "the most handsome boy" and then sacrificed to purify and protect the city from disease, drought, and famine. Numerous depictions of Hermes as a shepherd god carrying a lamb on his shoulders (Hermes kriophoros) have been found throughout the Mediterranean world, and it is possible that the iconography of Hermes as "The Good Shepherd" had an influence on early Christianity, specifically in the description of Christ as "the Good Shepherd" in the Gospel of John.

== Historical and literary sources ==
=== In the Mycenaean period ===
The earliest written record of Hermes comes from Linear B inscriptions from Pylos, Thebes, and Knossos dating to the Bronze Age Mycenaean period. Here, Hermes's name is rendered as e-ma-a (Ἑρμάhας). This name is always recorded alongside those of several goddesses, including Potnija, Posidaeja, Diwja, Hera, Pere, and Ipemedeja, indicating that his worship was strongly connected to theirs. This is a pattern that would continue in later periods, as worship of Hermes almost always took place within temples and sanctuaries primarily dedicated to goddesses, including Hera, Demeter, Hecate, and Despoina.

=== In the Archaic period ===
In literary works of Archaic Greece, Hermes is depicted both as a protector and a trickster. In Homer's Iliad, Hermes is called "the bringer of good luck", "guide and guardian", and "excellent in all the tricks". In Hesiod's Works and Days, Hermes is depicted giving Pandora the gifts of lies, seductive words, and a dubious character.

The earliest known theological or spiritual documents concerning Hermes are found in the Homeric Hymns composed c. the 7th century BC. In Homeric Hymn 4 to Hermes describes the god's birth and his theft of Apollo's sacred cattle. In this hymn, Hermes is invoked as a god "of many shifts" (polytropos), associated with cunning and thievery, but also a bringer of dreams and a night guardian. He is said to have invented the chelys lyre, as well as racing and the sport of wrestling.

=== In the Classical period ===
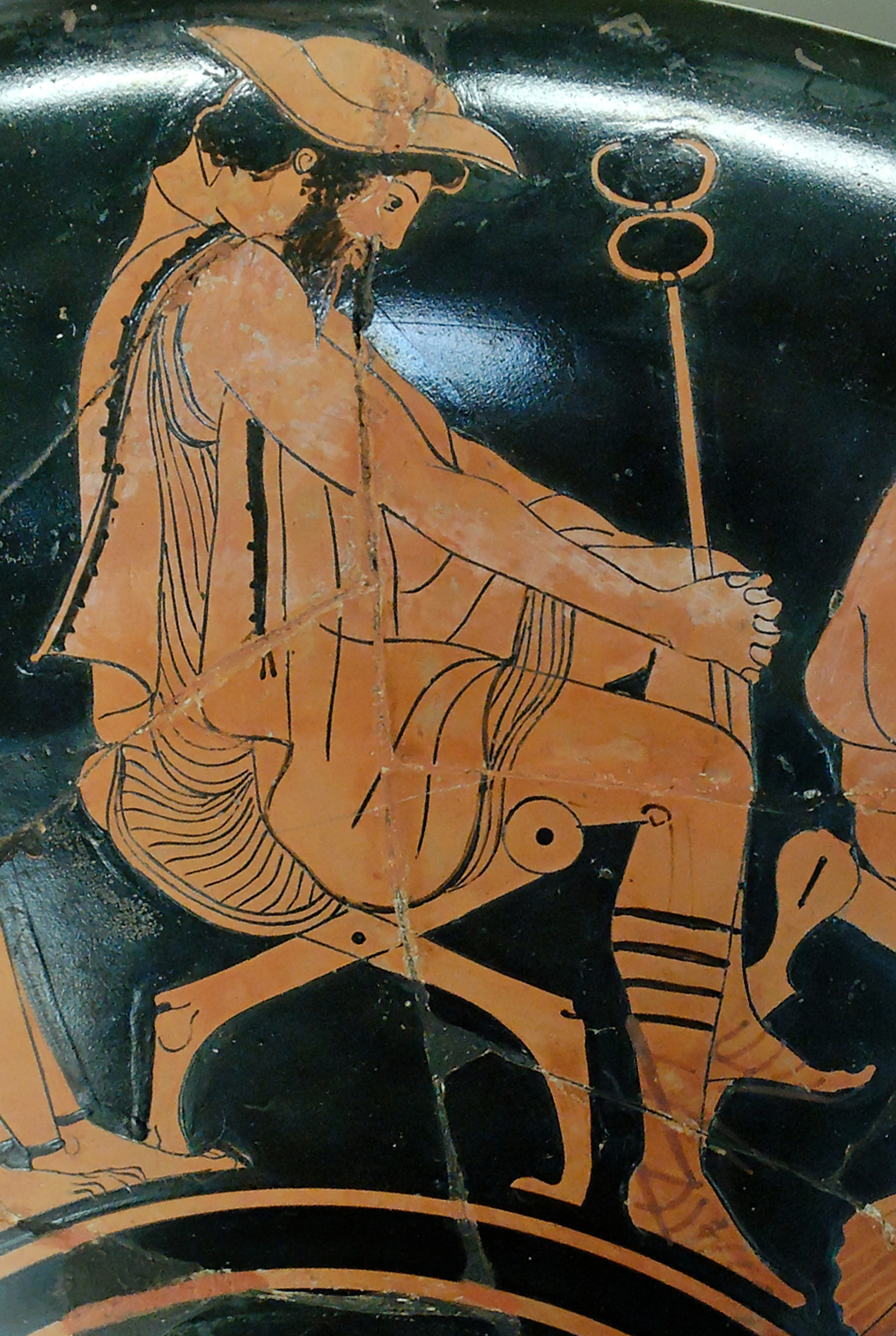
Hermes wearing a petasos. Attic red-figure cup, c. 480–470 BC; from Vulci

The cult of Hermes flourished in Attica, and many scholars writing before the discovery of the Linear B evidence considered Hermes to be a uniquely Athenian god. This region had numerous Hermai, or pillar-like icons, dedicated to the god marking boundaries, crossroads, and entryways. These were initially stone piles, later pillars made of wood, stone, or bronze, with carved images of Hermes, a phallus, or both. In the context of these herms, by the Classical period Hermes had come to be worshiped as the patron god of travelers and sailors. By the 5th century BC, Hermai were also in common use as grave monuments, emphasizing Hermes's role as a chthonic deity and psychopomp. This was probably his original function, and he may have been a late inclusion in the Olympic pantheon; Hermes is described as the "youngest" Olympian, and some myths, including his theft of Apollo's cows, describe his initial coming into contact with celestial deities. Hermes therefore came to be worshiped as a mediator between celestial and chthonic realms, as well as the one who facilitates interactions between mortals and the divine, often being depicted on libation vessels.

Due to his mobility and his liminal nature, mediating between opposites (such as merchant/customer), he was considered the god of commerce and social intercourse, the wealth brought in business, especially sudden or unexpected enrichment, travel, roads and crossroads, borders and boundary conditions or transient, the changes from the threshold, agreements and contracts, friendship, hospitality, sexual intercourse, games, data, the draw, good luck, the sacrifices and the sacrificial animals, flocks and shepherds and the fertility of land and cattle.

In Athens, Hermes Eion came to represent the Athenian naval superiority in their defeat of the Persians, under the command of Cimon, in 475 BC. In this context, Hermes became a god associated with the Athenian empire and its expansion, and of democracy itself, as well as all of those closely associated with it, from the sailors in the navy, to the merchants who drove the economy. A section of the agora in Athens became known as the Hermai, because it was filled with a large number of herms, placed there as votive offerings by merchants and others who wished to commemorate a personal success in commerce or other public affair. The Hermai was probably destroyed in the Siege of Athens and Piraeus (87–86 BC).

There was a popular, now lost play by the tragedian Astydamas with Hermes as the primary subject.

=== In the Hellenistic period ===
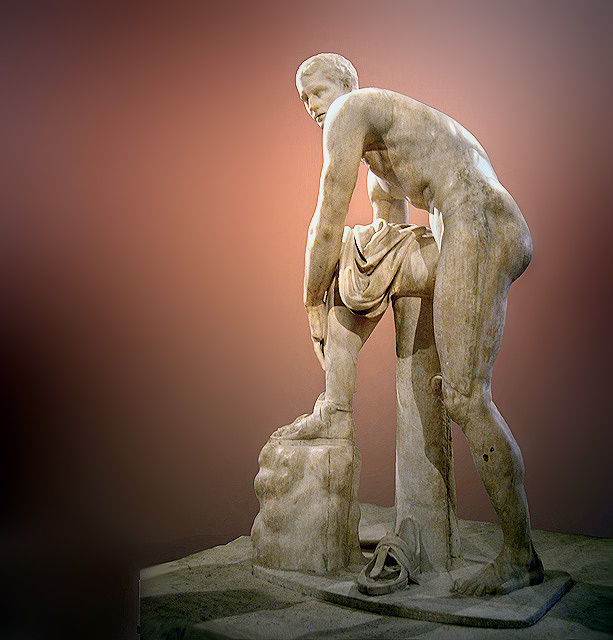
Hermes Fastening his Sandal, early Imperial Roman marble copy of a Lysippan bronze (Louvre Museum)

As Greek culture and influence spread following the conquests of Alexander the Great, a period of syncretism or interpretatio graeca saw many traditional Greek deities identified with foreign counterparts. In Ptolemaic Egypt, for example, the Egyptian god Thoth was identified by Greek speakers as the Egyptian form of Hermes. The two gods were worshiped as one at the Temple of Thoth in Khemenu, a city which became known in Greek as Hermopolis. This led to Hermes gaining the attributes of a god of translation and interpretation, or more generally, a god of knowledge and learning. This is illustrated by a 3rd-century BC example of a letter sent by the priest Petosiris to King Nechopso, probably written in Alexandria c. 150 BC, stating that Hermes is the teacher of all secret wisdoms, which are accessible by the experience of religious ecstasy.

An epithet of Thoth found in the temple at Esna, "Thoth the great, the great, the great", became applied to Hermes beginning in at least 172 BC. This lent Hermes one of his most famous later titles, Hermes Trismegistus (Ἑρμῆς ὁ Τρισμέγιστος), 'thrice-greatest Hermes'. The figure of Hermes Trismegistus would later absorb a variety of other esoteric wisdom traditions and become a major component of Hermeticism, alchemy, and related traditions.

=== In the Roman period ===
As early as the 4th century BC, Romans had adopted Hermes into their own religion, combining his attributes and worship with the earlier Etruscan god Turms under the name Mercury. According to St. Augustin, the Latin name "Mercury" may be a title derived from "medio currens", in reference to Hermes's role as a mediator and messenger who moves between worlds. Mercury became one of the most popular Roman gods, as attested by the numerous shrines and depictions in artwork found in Pompeii. In art, the Roman Mercury continued the style of depictions found in earlier representations of both Hermes and Turms, a young, beardless god with winged shoes or hat, carrying the caduceus. His role as a god of boundaries, a messenger, and a psychopomp also remained unchanged following his adoption into the Roman religion (these attributes were also similar to those in the Etruscan's worship of Turms).

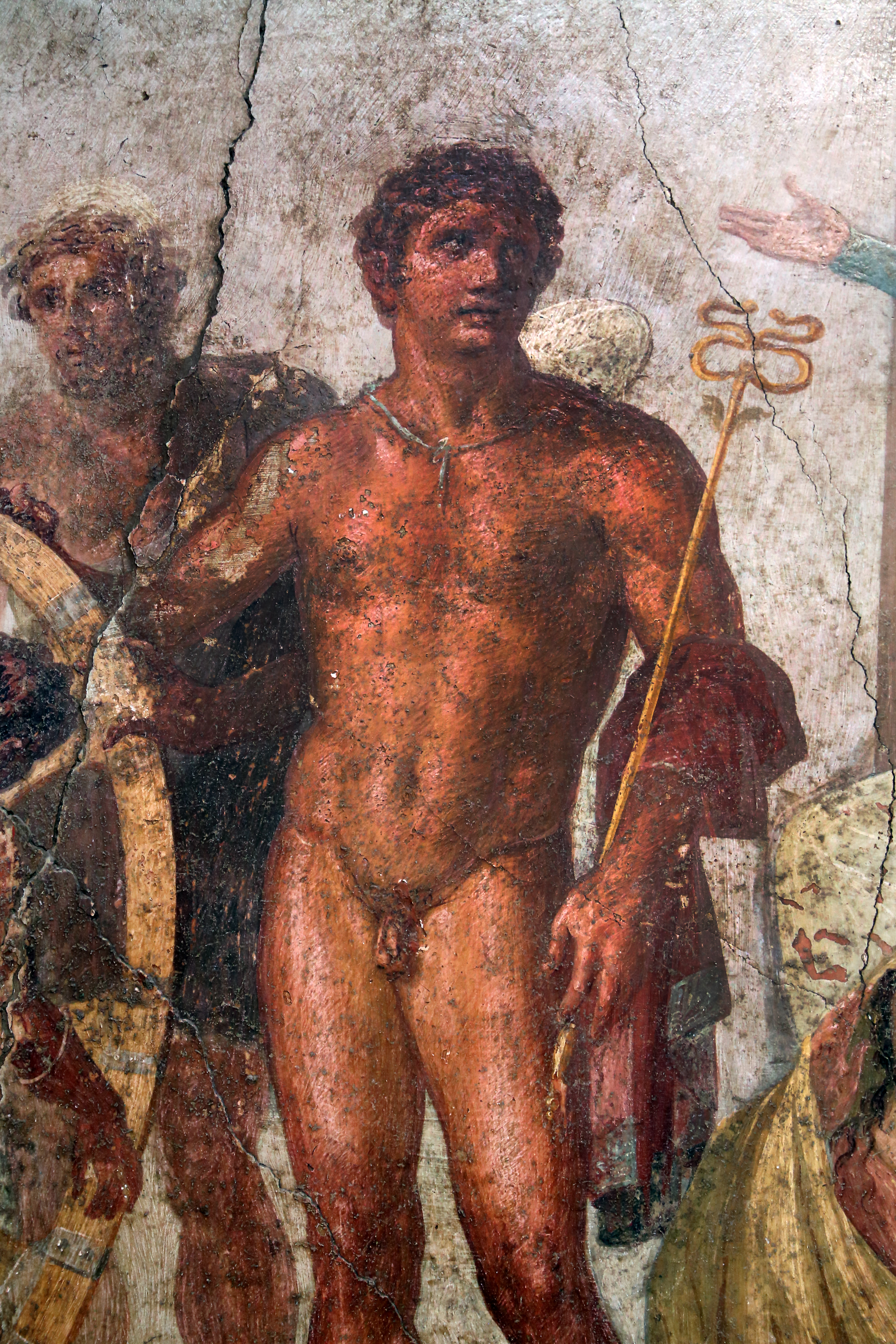
Hermes on an antique fresco from Pompeii

The Romans identified the Germanic god Odin with Mercury, and there is evidence that Germanic peoples who had contact with Roman culture also accepted this identification. Odin and Mercury/Hermes share several attributes in common. For example, both are depicted carrying a staff and wearing a wide-brimmed hat, and both are travelers or wanderers. However, the reasons for this interpretation appear to go beyond superficial similarities: Both gods are connected to the dead (Mercury as psychopomp and Odin as lord of the dead in Valhalla), both were connected to eloquent speech, and both were associated with secret knowledge. The identification of Odin as Mercury was probably also influenced by a previous association of a more Odin-like Celtic god as the "Celtic Mercurius".

A further Roman Imperial-era syncretism came in the form of Hermanubis, the result of the identification of Hermes with the Egyptian god of the dead, Anubis. Hermes and Anubis were both psychopomps the primary attribute leading to their conflation as the same god. Hermanubis depicted with a human body and a jackal head, holding the caduceus. In addition to his function of guiding souls to the afterlife, Hermanubis represented the Egyptian priesthood the investigation of truth.

Beginning around the turn of the 1st century AD, a process began by which, in certain traditions Hermes became euhemerised – that is, interpreted as a historical, mortal figure who had become divine or elevated to godlike status in legend. Numerous books of wisdom and magic (including astrology, theosophy, and alchemy) were attributed to this "historical" Hermes, usually identified in his Alexandrian form of Hermes Trismegistus. As a collection, these works are referred to as the Hermetica.

=== In the Middle Ages ===
Though worship of Hermes had been almost fully suppressed in the Roman Empire following the Christian persecution of paganism under Theodosius I in the 4th century AD, Hermes continued to be recognized as a mystical or prophetic figure, though a mortal one, by Christian scholars. Early medieval Christians such as Augustine believed that a euhemerised Hermes Trismegistus had been an ancient pagan prophet who predicted the emergence of Christianity in his writings. Some Christian philosophers in the medieval and Renaissance periods believed in the existence of a "prisca theologia", a single thread of true theology that could be found uniting all religions. Christian philosophers used Hermetic writings and other ancient philosophical literature to support their belief in the prisca theologia, arguing that Hermes Trismegistus was a contemporary of Moses, or that he was the third in a line of important prophets after Enoch and Noah.

The 10th-century Suda attempted to further Christianize the figure of Hermes, claiming that "He was called Trismegistus on account of his praise of the trinity, saying there is one divine nature in the trinity."

=== Temples and sacred places ===
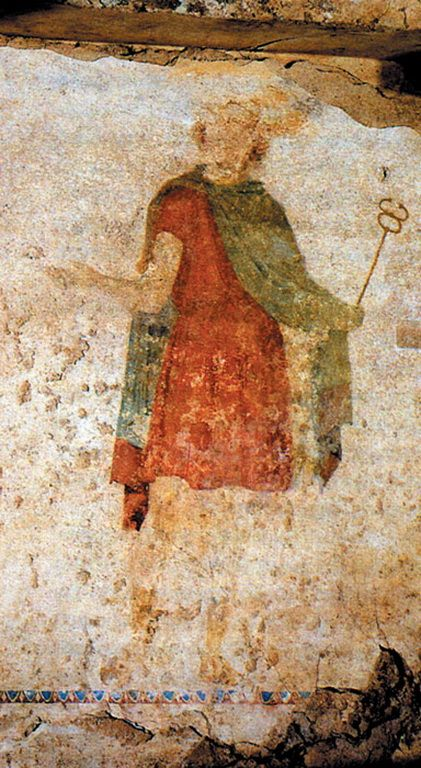
Hermes fresco from the Macedonian Tomb of Judgement, 4th century BC

There are only three temples known to have been specifically dedicated to Hermes during the Classical Greek period, all of them in Arcadia. Though there are a few references in ancient literature to "numerous" temples of Hermes, this may be poetic license describing the ubiquitous herms, or other, smaller shrines to Hermes located in the temples of other deities. One of the oldest places of worship for Hermes was Mount Cyllene in Arcadia, where some myths say he was born. Tradition holds that his first temple was built by Lycaon. From there, the Hermes cult would have been taken to Athens, from which it radiated to the whole of Greece. In the Roman period, additional temples to Hermes (Mercury) were constructed across the Empire, including several in modern-day Tunisia. Mercury's temple in Rome was situated in the Circus Maximus, between the Aventine and Palatine hills, and was built in 495 BC.

In most places, temples were consecrated to Hermes in conjunction with Aphrodite, as in Attica, Arcadia, Crete, Samos and in Magna Graecia. Several ex-votos found in his temples revealed his role as initiator of young adulthood, among them soldiers and hunters, since war and certain forms of hunting were seen as ceremonial initiatory ordeals. This function of Hermes explains why some images in temples and other vessels show him as a teenager.

As a patron of the gym and fighting, Hermes had statues in gyms and he was also worshiped in the sanctuary of the Twelve Gods in Olympia where Greeks celebrated the Olympic Games. His statue was held there on an altar dedicated to him and Apollo together. A temple within the Aventine was consecrated in 495 BC.

Pausanias wrote that during his time, at Megalopolis people could see the ruins of the temple of Hermes Acacesius. In addition, the Tricrena (Τρίκρηνα, meaning Three Springs) mountains at Pheneus were sacred to Hermes, because three springs were there and according to the legend, Hermes was washed in them, after birth, by the nymphs of the mountain. Furthermore, at Pharae there was a water sacred to Hermes. The name of the spring was Hermes's stream and the fish in it were not caught, being considered sacred to the god.

Sacrifices to Hermes involved honey, cakes, pigs, goats, and lambs. In the city of Tanagra, it was believed that Hermes had been nursed under a wild strawberry tree, the remains of which were held there in the shrine of Hermes Promachus, and in the hills Phene ran three waterways that were sacred to him, because he was believed to have been bathed there at birth.

=== Festivals ===
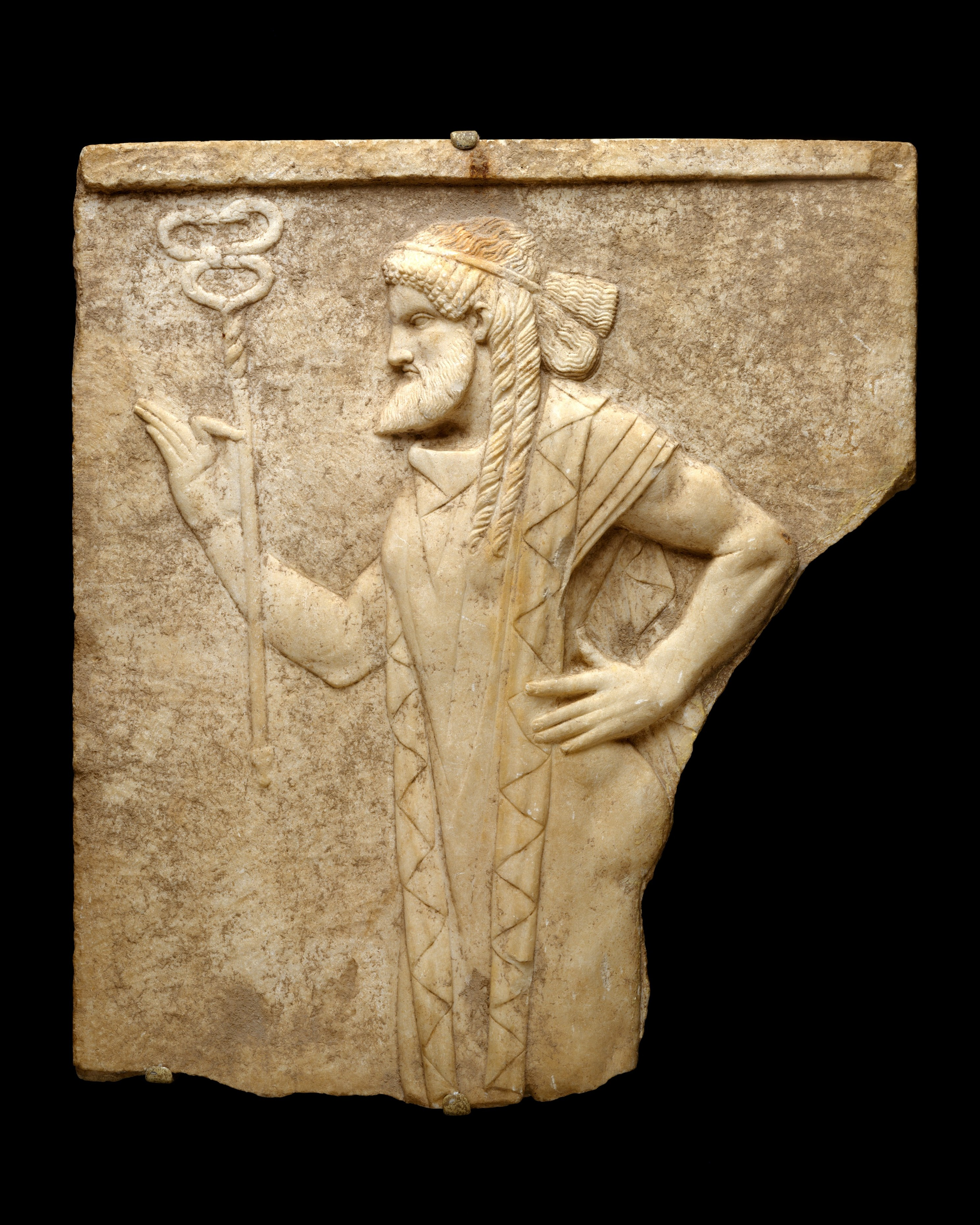
Marble relief with Hermes. Roman, 27 BCE – 68 CE. Metropolitan Museum of Art.

Hermes's feast was the Hermaia, which was celebrated with sacrifices to the god and with athletics and gymnastics, possibly having been established in the 6th century BC, but no documentation on the festival before the 4th century BC survives. However, Plato said that Socrates attended a Hermaea. Of all the festivals involving Greek games, these were the most like initiations because participation in them was restricted to young boys and excluded adults.

In Boeotia there was a fest at Tanagra, and two temples. The first of Hermes kriophoros (ram-bearer) who was related to the festival and the second of Hermes promachos (champion) At Coroneia there was a sanctuary of Hermes epimelios(keeper of the flocks) and at Corseia a grove with a statue of Hermes. In Attica Hermes was worshiped together with other gods, especially with the nymphs. Inscriptions from the islands indicate that there were festivals of Hermes at Chios and Crete, where he had the epithet dromios (of the race-course). In Corinth he had a temple and two bronze statues and at Pherai an oracular shrine and a spring of Hermes agoraios (of the market) Hermes was specially worshiped at Pheneos where he had a temple and the games "Hermaia" were celebrated.

At Pellene there was a statue of Hermes dolios and an old established race. At Kyllene the statue of Hermes was a phallos. Near Tegea there was the temple of Hermes, Aepytus. At Megalopolis there was a temple of Hermes Akakesios, and a second near a stadium for athletic games. The myth of the birth of Hermes is related to the mountain Kyllene near Pheneos and the god had the surname Kyllenios. Pindar refers to games of Hermes at Kyllene that seem to be similar to the games of Pheneos.

== Epithets ==
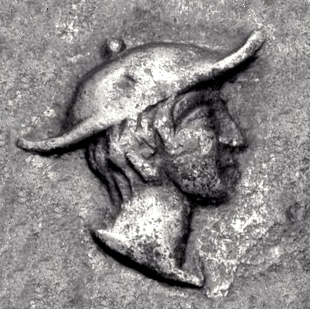
Hermes wearing a petasos. Coinage of Kapsa, Macedon, c. 400 BC.

=== Argeïphontes ===
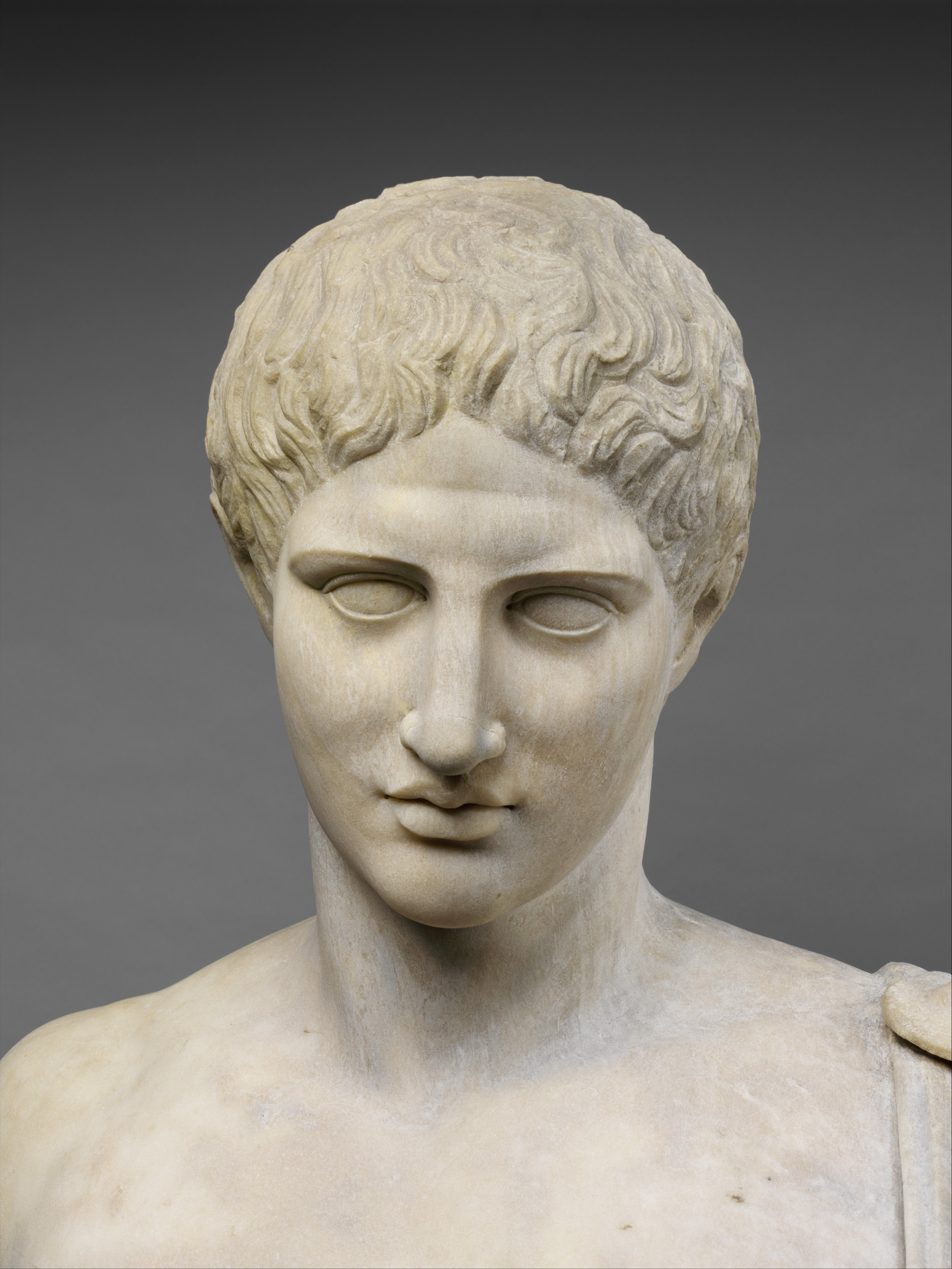
Marble statue of Hermes. 1st or 2nd century A.D.

Hermes's epithet Argeïphontes (Ancient Greek: Ἀργειφόντης; Latin: Argicida), meaning "slayer of Argus", recalls the slaying of the hundred-eyed giant Argus Panoptes by the messenger god. Argus was watching over the heifer-nymph Io in the sanctuary of Hera in Argos. Hermes, disguised as a shepherd, placed a charm on Argus's eyes with the caduceus to cause the giant to sleep, after which he slew the giant with a harpe. The eyes were then put into the tail of the peacock, a symbol of Hera.

An Homeric form is Diaktoros Argeïphontes.(Ancient Greek: διάκτορος ἀργειφόντης). Frisk derives "argophontes" from "argos" (argipous), "fast" frequently for dogs. Sanskrit rirẚ, rji-pya, "fast flying", Armenian arevi. The meaning seems similar to the epithet of Hermes kynagches, dog-throttler. "Diaktor" (from -kter, kill) indicates a god of death.

=== Local cults ===
- Aipytos, with a temple at Tegea in Arcadia.
- Acacesius, with a temple at Megalopolis
- Cranaios, on the mountain Ida in Crete.
- Cyllenian (Greek: Κυλλήνιος), because according to some myths he was born at the Mount Cyllene, and nursed by the Oread nymph Cyllene.
- Dromios, god of the race-course in Crete
- Perpheraios, Hyperborean in Thrace.

=== Related to animals ===
- Epimelios, taking care of animals.
- Kriophoros.In ancient Greek culture, kriophoros (Greek: κριοφόρος) or criophorus, the "ram-bearer", is a figure that commemorates the solemn sacrifice of a ram. It becomes an epithet of Hermes.
- Ktenites, taking care of horses, lions, dogs, etc.
- Molossos, nursing small animals.
- Nomios, nursing small animals.
- Kynagches, dog throttler

=== Messenger and guide ===
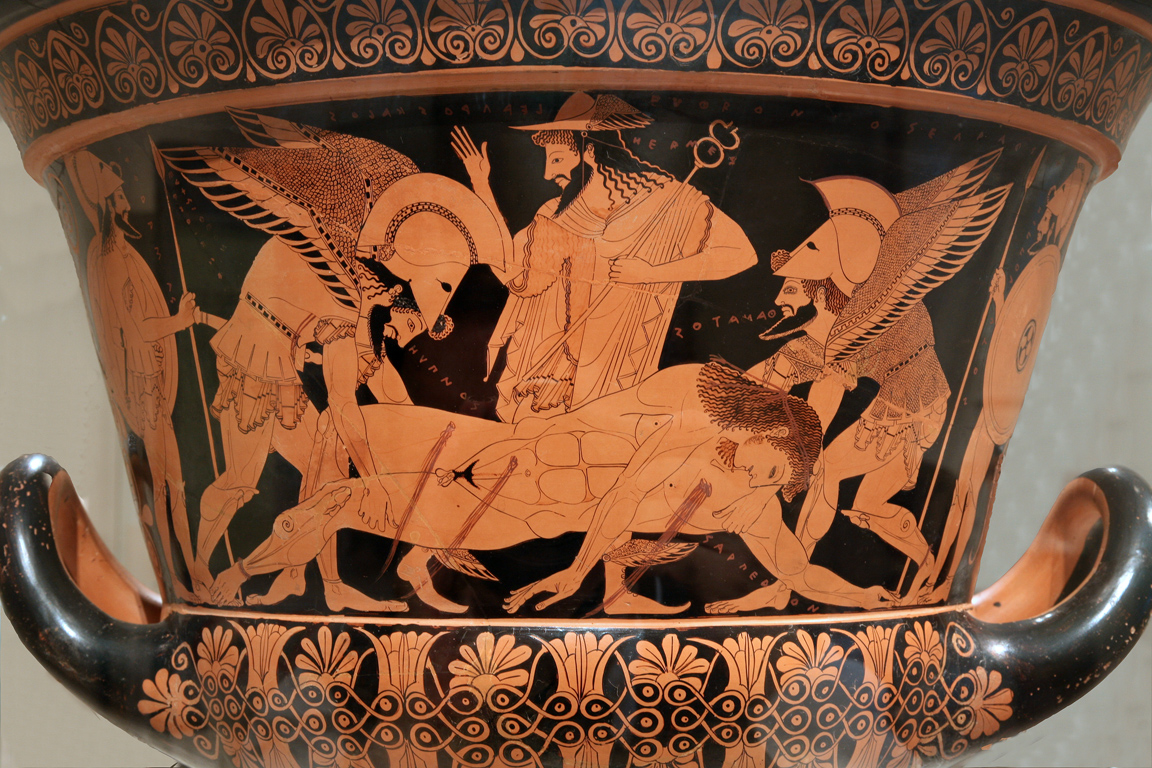
Sarpedon's body carried by Hypnos and Thanatos (Sleep and Death), while Hermes watches. Side A of the so-called "Euphronios krater", Attic red-figured calyx-krater signed by Euxitheos (potter) and Euphronios (painter), c. 515 BC.

The chief office of the god was as messenger. Explicitly, at least in sources of classical writings, of Euripides's Electra and Iphigenia in Aulis and in Epictetus's Discourses. Hermes (Diactorus, Angelos) the messenger, is in fact only seen in this role, for Zeus, from within the pages of the Odyssey. The messenger divine and herald of the Gods, he wears the gifts from his father, the petasos and talaria.

Oh mighty messenger of the gods of the upper and lower worlds... (Aeschylus).

- Angelos, messenger.
- Agetor, god of travellers.
- Chrysorappis, "with golden wand", an Homeric epithet.
- Diaktoros, an Homeric epithet. Messenger of the gods and conductor of the shades of the dead.
- Enodios, "of the road" or "of the roadside", a cult epithet of Hermes associated with roads, travelers, and crossroads.
- Eriounios, an Homeric epithet with uncertain meaning. According to Hesychius: oùnei, deṹro, dràme. The Arcadians also oùnon, the Cypriots drómon. This intepretetion relates the epithet to "move quickly".
- Hegemonios, protector of the wayfarers.
- Hodios, patron of travelers and wayfarers.
- Keryx, messenger.
- Oneiropompus, conductor of dreams.
- Poimandres, shepherd of men.
- Pompos, conveyor related to the underworld.
- Pompaios, conductor.
- Psychopompos, conveyor or conductor of souls, and psychogogue, conductor or leader of souls in (or through) the underworld.
- Sokos Eriounios, a Homeric epithet with a much-debated meaning – probably "swift, good-running". But in the Hymn to Hermes Eriounios is etymologized as "very beneficial".

=== Trade ===
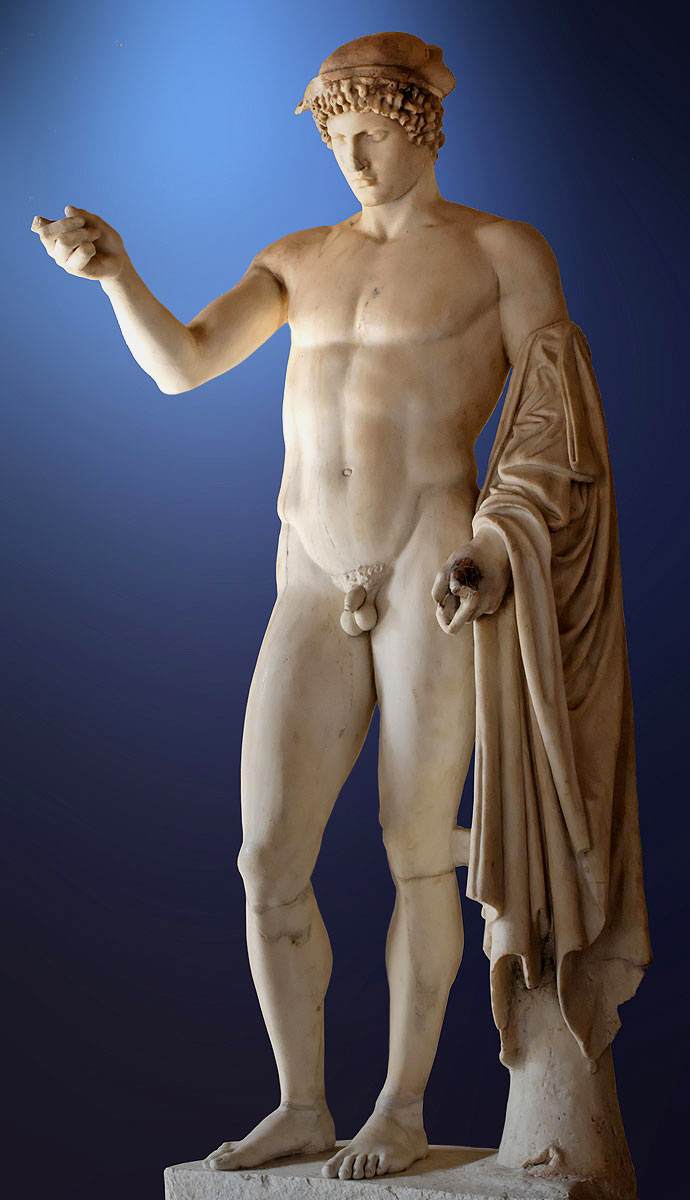
So-called "Logios Hermes" (Hermes Orator). Marble, Roman copy from the late 1st century BC – early 2nd century AD after a Greek original of the 5th century BC.

- Agoraeus, of the agora; belonging to the market (Aristophanes)
- Empolaios, "engaged in traffic and commerce"

Hermes is sometimes depicted in art works holding a purse.

=== Dolios ("tricky") ===
No cult to Hermes Dolios existed in Attica, and so "this form of Hermes seems to have existed in speech only, but he was surely still a real power"

Hermes Dolio is ambiguous. According to prominent folklorist Yeleazar Meletinsky, Hermes is a deified trickster and master of thieves ("a plunderer, a cattle-raider, a night-watching" in the Homeric Hymn to Hermes) and deception (Euripides) and (possibly evil) tricks and trickeries, crafty (from lit. god of craft), the cheat, the god of stealth. He is also known as the friendliest to man, cunning, treacherous, and a schemer.

Hermes Dolios was worshipped at Pellene and invoked through Odysseus.

(As the ways of gain are not always the ways of honesty and straightforwardness, Hermes obtains a bad character and an in-moral (amoral [ed.]) cult as Dolios)

Hermes is amoral like a baby. Zeus sent Hermes as a teacher to humanity to teach them knowledge of and value of justice and to improve inter-personal relationships ("bonding between mortals").

Considered to have a mastery of rhetorical persuasion and special pleading, the god typically has nocturnal modus operandi. Hermes knows the boundaries and crosses the borders of them to confuse their definition.

=== Thief ===
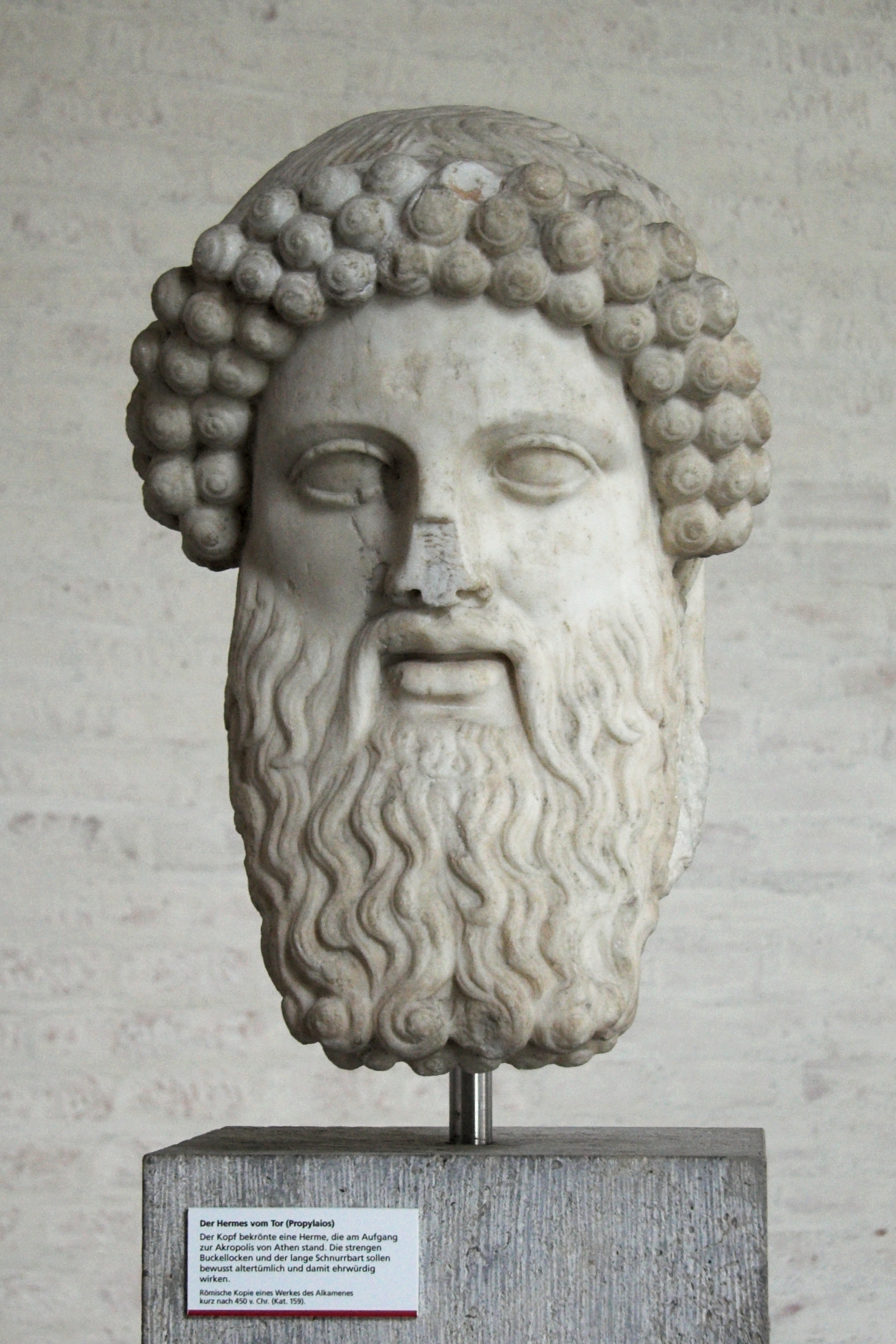
Hermes Propylaeus. Roman copy of the Alcamenes statue from the entrance of the Athenian Acropolis, original shortly after the 450 BC.

- In the Lang translation of the Homeric Hymn to Hermes, the god after being born is described as a robber, a captain of raiders and a thief of the gates.
- Klepsiphron (κλεψίφρων), with the mind of a thief.
- Pheletes (φηλητής), thief.
- Phelos (φήλος), deceitful.

According to the late Jungian psychotherapist López-Pedraza, everything Hermes thieves, he later sacrifices to the gods.

==== Patron of thieves ====
Autolycus received his skills as the greatest of thieves due to sacrificing to Hermes as his patron.

=== Additional ===
Other epithets included:

- Agonios, as president of games.
- Akaketos "without guile", "gracious", an Homeric epithet.
- Chthonius – at the festival Athenia Chytri sacrifices are made to this visage of the god only.
- Dotor Eaon (δώτωρ εάων), giver of good things," an Homeric epithet.
- Eriboas, loud shouting
- Enagonios, presiding over the games.
- Eriounis, an Homeric epithet with uncertain meaning. Probably helper or bringer of good luck.
- Eriounios, an Homeric epithet with uncertain meaning. According to Hesychius: oùnei, deṹro, dràme. The Arcadians also oùnon, the Cypriots drómon. This intepretetion relates the epithet to "move quickly".
- Koinos, fellowship, communion, partnership
- Ploutodotes, giver of wealth (as inventor of fire)
- Promachos, champion.
- Proopylaios, "before the gate", "guardian of the gate"; Pylaios, "doorkeeper"
- Sokos (σώκος), the strong one, an Homeric epithet.
- Stropheus, "the socket in which the pivot of the door moves" (Kerényi in Edwardson) or "door-hinge". Protector of the door (that is the boundary), to the temple

== Mythology ==
=== Early Greek sources ===
==== Homer and Hesiod ====
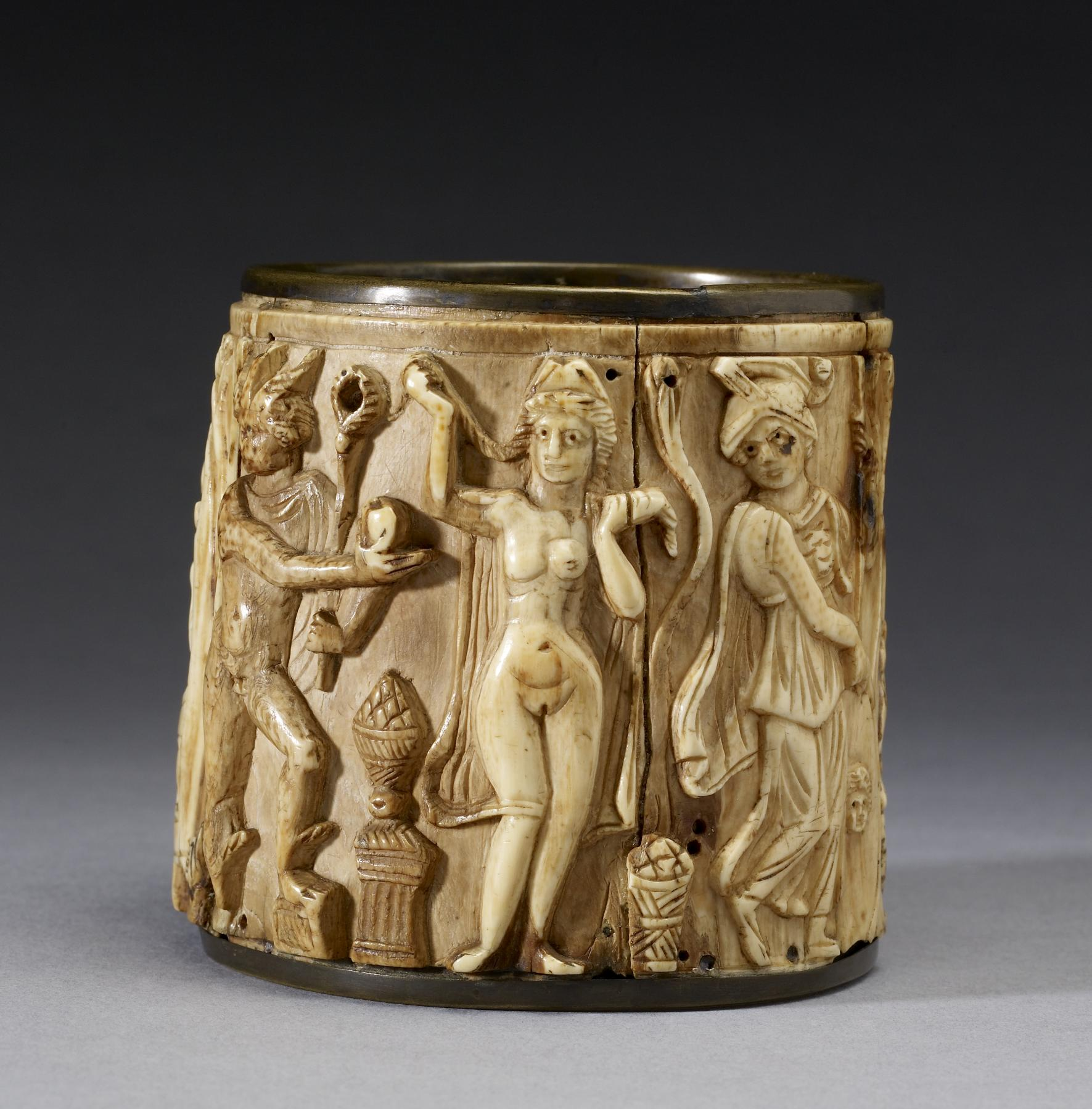
This circular Pyxis or box depicts two scenes. The one shown presents Hermes awarding the golden apple of the Hesperides to Aphrodite, whom Paris has selected as the most beautiful of the goddesses. The Walters Art Museum.

According to the Homeric Hymn to Hermes, Zeus, in the dead of night, secretly had sex with Maia, who avoided the company of the gods, in a cave of Cyllene. She became pregnant with Hermes. After giving birth to the baby, Maia wrapped him in blankets and went to sleep. The rapidly maturing infant Hermes crawled away to Thessaly, where, by nightfall of his first day, he stole some of his half-brother Apollo's cattle and invented the lyre from a tortoise shell. Maia refused to believe Apollo when he claimed that Hermes was the thief, and Zeus then sided with Apollo. Finally, Apollo exchanged the cattle for the lyre, which became one of his identifying attributes.

The Homeric Hymn to Hermes invokes him as the one "of many shifts (polytropos), blandly cunning, a robber, a cattle driver, a bringer of dreams, a watcher by night, a thief at the gates, one who was soon to show forth wonderful deeds among the deathless gods." The word polutropos ("of many shifts, turning many ways, of many devices, ingenious, or much wandering") is also used to describe his mortal descendant Odysseus in the first line of the Odyssey. In addition to the chelys lyre, Hermes was believed to have invented many types of racing and the sport of wrestling, and therefore was a patron of athletes.

Homer and Hesiod portrayed Hermes as the author of skilled or deceptive acts and also as a benefactor of gods and mortals alike. In Works and Days, when Zeus ordered Hephaestus to create Pandora to disgrace humanity by punishing Prometheus's act of giving fire to man, every god gave her a gift, and Hermes's gifts were crafty words and a dubious character. Hermes was then instructed to take her as wife to the Titan Epimetheus. With the help of Artemis, Hermes rescued Ares from a brazen vessel where he had been imprisoned by Otus and Ephialtes. In the Iliad, Hermes is called "the bringer of good luck", "guide and guardian", and "excellent in all the tricks". He was a divine ally of the Greeks against the Trojans, but he also protected Priam when he went to the Greek camp to retrieve the body of his son Hector and accompanied them back to Troy. In the Odyssey, Hermes helps the protagonist Odysseus by informing him about the fate of his companions, who were turned into animals by the power of Circe. Hermes instructed Odysseus to protect himself by chewing a magic herb; he also told Calypso of Zeus's order to free Odysseus from her island to allow him to continue his journey back home. When Odysseus killed the suitors of his wife, Hermes led their souls to Hades.

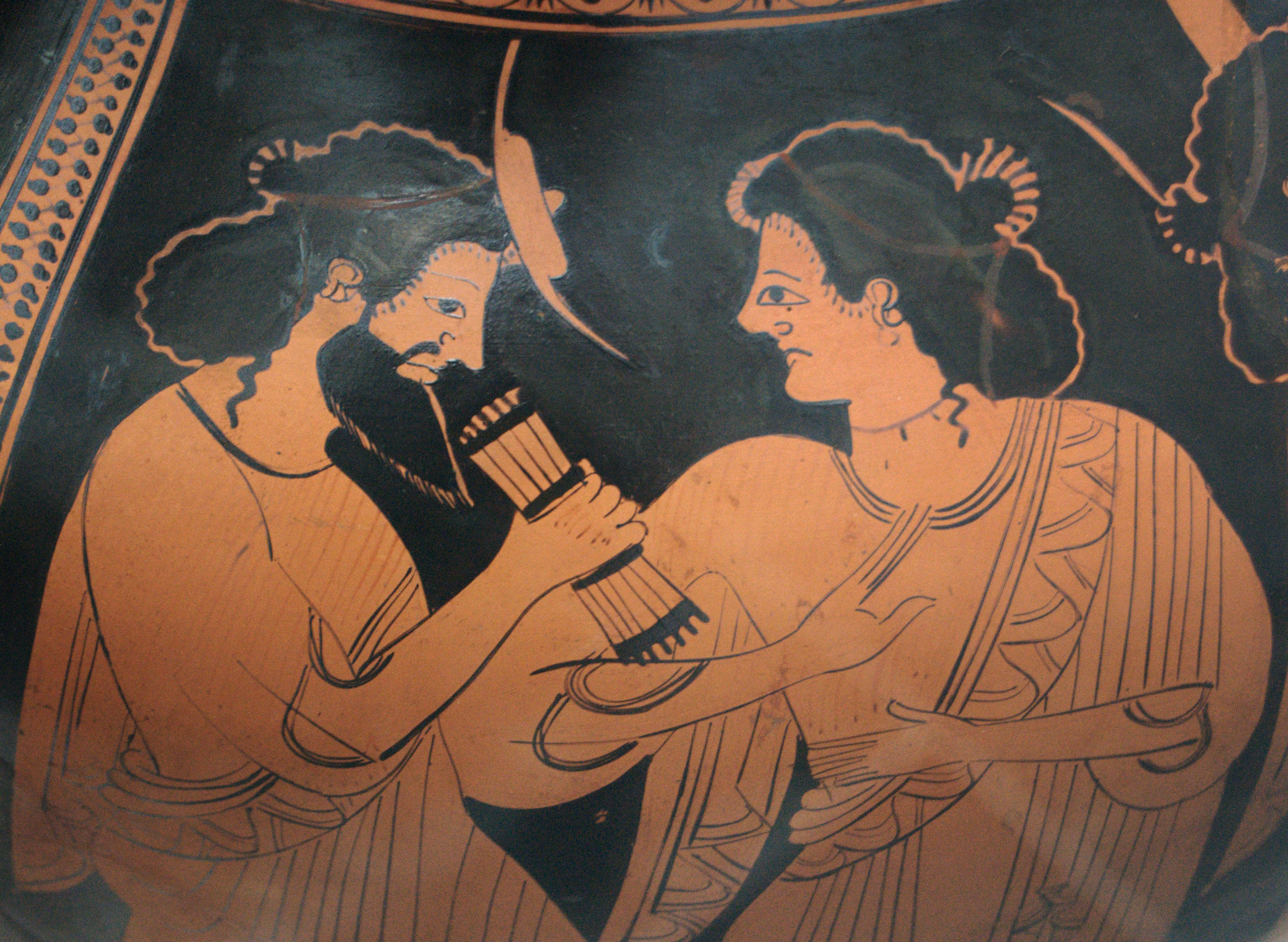
Hermes with his mother Maia. Detail of the side B of an Attic red-figure belly-amphora, c. 500 BC.

==== Athenian tragic playwrights ====
Aeschylus wrote in The Eumenides that Hermes helped Orestes kill Clytemnestra under a false identity and other stratagems, and also said that he was the god of searches, and those who seek things lost or stolen. In Philoctetes, Sophocles invokes Hermes when Odysseus needs to convince Philoctetes to join the Trojan War on the side of the Greeks, and in Euripides's Rhesus Hermes helps Dolon spy on the Greek navy.

==== Aesop ====
Aesop featured him in several of his fables, as ruler of the gate of prophetic dreams, as the god of athletes, of edible roots, and of hospitality. He also said that Hermes had assigned each person his share of intelligence. One of the most notable fables in which Hermes appears is the Honest Woodcutter.

=== Hellenistic Greek sources ===
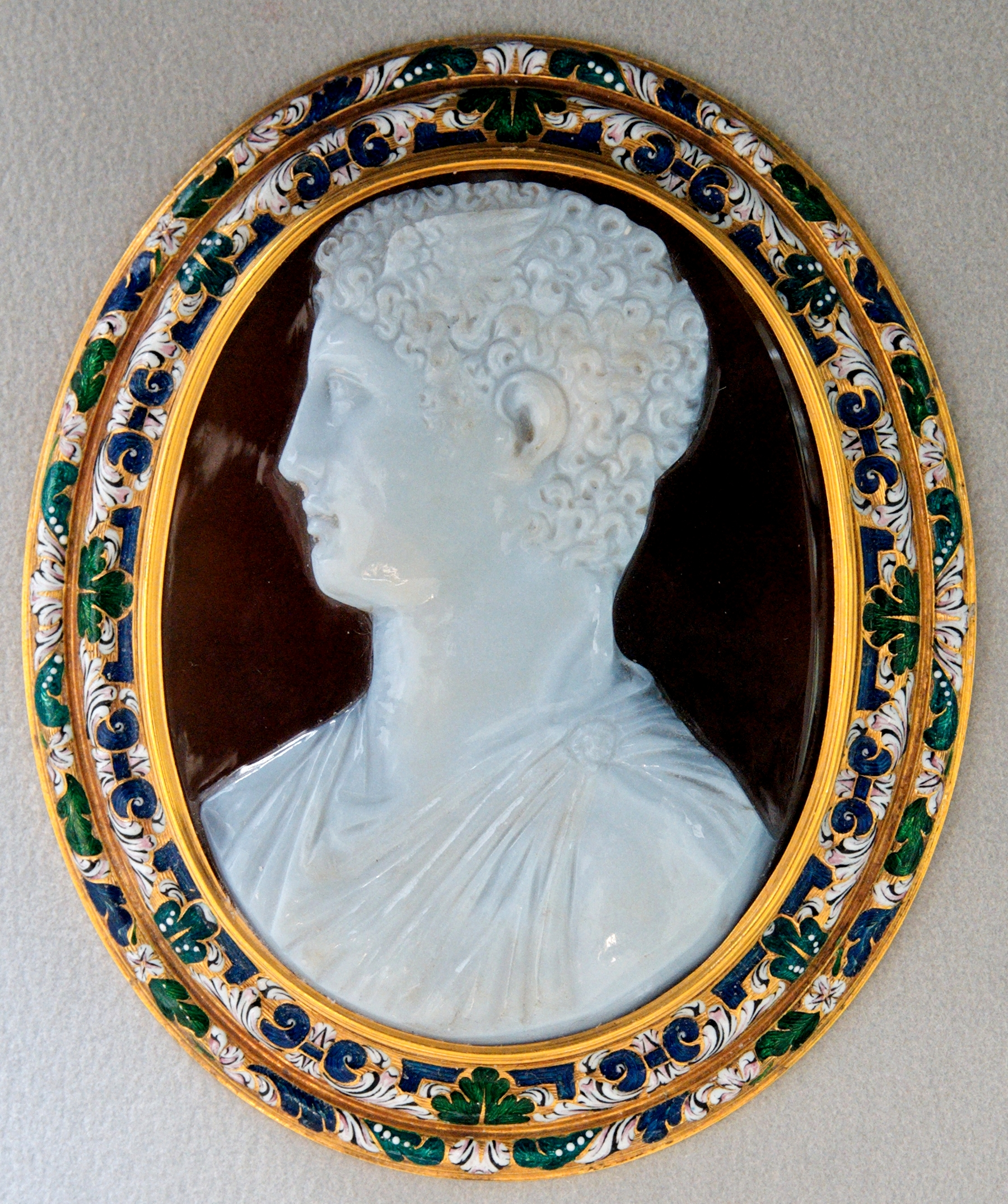
Sardonyx cameo of a Ptolemaic prince as Hermes, Cabinet des médailles, Paris

One of the Orphic Hymns Khthonios is dedicated to Hermes, indicating that he was also a god of the underworld. Aeschylus had called him by this epithet several times. Another is the Orphic Hymn to Hermes, where his association with the athletic games held is mystic in tone.

Phlegon of Tralles said Hermes was invoked to ward off ghosts, and Apollodorus reports several events involving Hermes. According to Apollodorus, Hermes participated in the Gigantomachy in defense of Olympus; was given the task of bringing baby Dionysus to be cared for by Ino and Athamas and later took him to be cared for by the Nysan nymphs, later called the Hyades; aided Perseus in fetching the head of the Gorgon Medusa, favored the young Heracles by giving him a sword when he finished his education; and lead Hera, Athena and Aphrodite to Paris to be judged by him in a beauty contest.

Anyte of Tegea of the 3rd century BC, in the translation by Richard Aldington, wrote, "I Hermes stand here at the crossroads by the wind beaten orchard, near the hoary grey coast; and I keep a resting place for weary men. And the cool stainless spring gushes out."

=== Lovers, victims and children ===
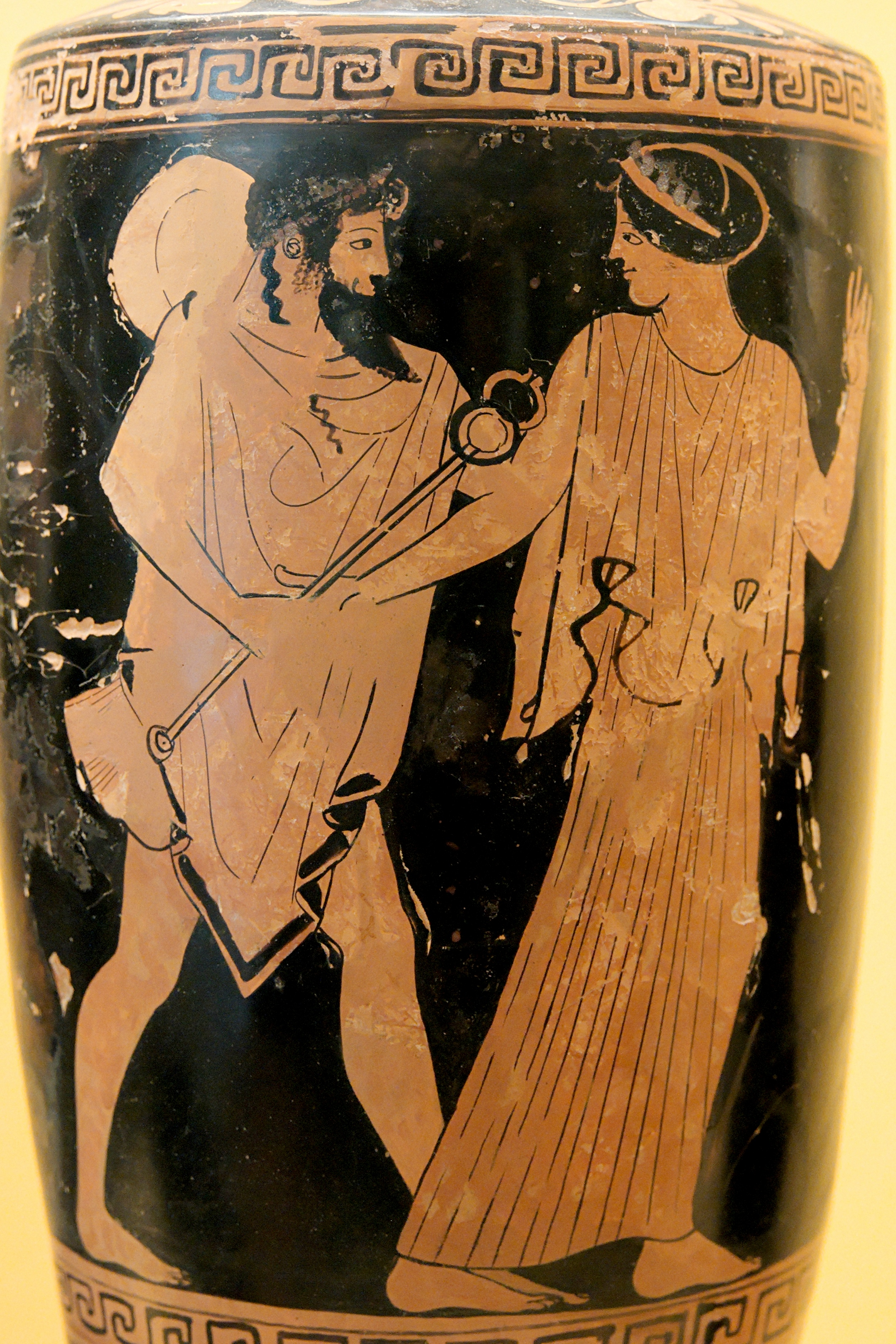
Hermes pursuing a woman, probably Herse. Attic red-figure amphora, c. 470 BC.

- Peitho, the goddess of seduction and persuasion, was said by Nonnus to be the wife of Hermes.
- Aphrodite, the goddess of love and beauty, was wooed by Hermes. After she had rejected him, Hermes sought the help of Zeus to seduce her. Zeus, out of pity, sent his eagle to take away Aphrodite's sandal when she was bathing, and gave it to Hermes. When Aphrodite came looking for the sandal, Hermes seduced her. They had a child, Hermaphroditus.
- Daeira, an Oceanid and an underworld goddess, mated with Hermes and gave birth to a son named Eleusis.
- Apemosyne, a princess of Crete, was travelling to Rhodes one day with her brother Althaemenes. Hermes saw her and fell in love with her, but Apemosyne fled from him. Hermes could not catch her because she ran faster than him. The god then devised a plan and laid some freshly skinned hides across her path. Later, on her way back from a spring, Apemosyne slipped on those hides and fell. At that moment, Hermes caught her and raped her. When Apemosyne told her brother what had happened, he became angry, thinking that she was lying about being molested by the god. In his anger, he kicked her to death.
- Chione, a princess of Phokis, attracted the attention of Hermes. He used his wand to put her to sleep and raped her. To Hermes she bore a son, Autolycus.
- Herse, an Athenian princess, was loved by Hermes and bore a son named Cephalus to him.
- Iphthime, a princess of Doros, was loved by Hermes. They had three Satyroi – named Pherespondos, Lykos and Pronomos.
- Penelopeia, an Arcadian nymph, was loved by Hermes. It is said that Hermes had sex with her in the form of a goat, which resulted in their son, the god Pan, having goat legs. She has been confused or conflated with Penelope, the wife of Odysseus.
- The Oreads, the nymphs of the mountains were said to mate with Hermes in the highlands, breeding more of their kind.
- Tanagra was a nymph for whom the gods Ares and Hermes competed in a boxing match. Hermes won and carried her off to Tanagra in Boeotia.

According to Hyginus's Fabula, Pan, the Greek god of nature, shepherds and flocks, is the son of Hermes through the nymph Dryope. It is likely that the worship of Hermes himself actually originated as an aspect of Pan as the god of boundaries, which could explain their association as parent and child in Hyginus. In other sources, the god Priapus is understood as a son of Hermes.

According to the mythographer Apollodorus, Autolycus, the Prince of Thieves, was a son of Hermes and Chione, making Hermes a great-grandfather of Odysseus.

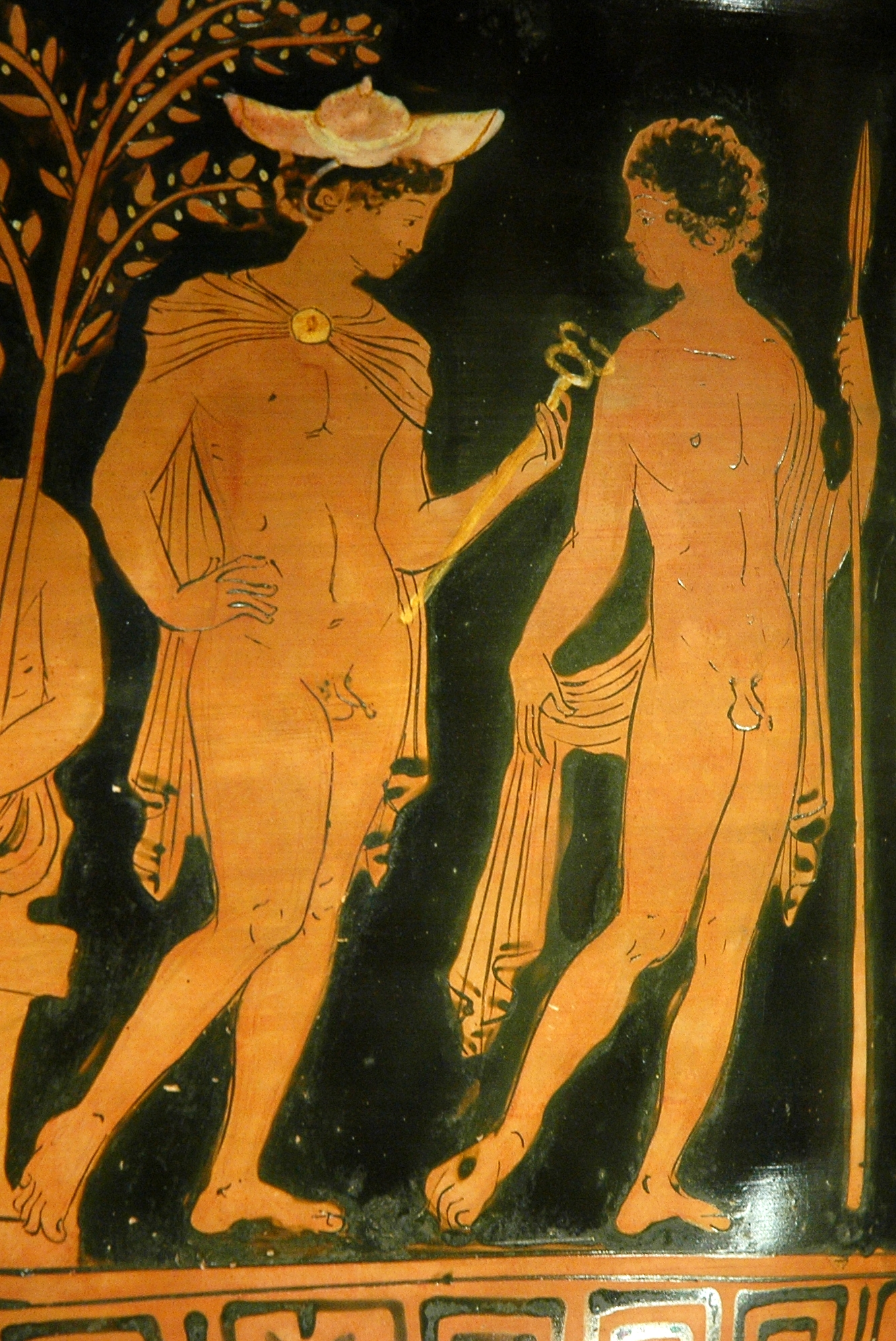
Hermes and a young warrior. Bendis Painter, c. 370 BC.

Once, Hermes chased either Persephone or Hecate with the aim to rape her; but the goddess snored or roared in anger, frightening him off so that he desisted, hence her earning the name "Brimo" ("angry").

Hermes also loved young men in pederastic relationships where he bestowed or taught something related to combat, athletics, herding, poetry and music. Photius wrote that Polydeuces (Pollux), one of the Dioscuri, was a lover of Hermes, to whom he gifted the Thessalian horse Dotor. Amphion became a great singer and musician after his lover Hermes taught him to play and gave him a golden lyre. Crocus was said to be a beloved of Hermes and was accidentally killed by the god in a game of discus when he unexpectedly stood up; as the unfortunate youth's blood dripped on the soil, the saffron flower came to be. Perseus received the divine items (talaria, petasos, and the helm of darkness) from Hermes because he loved him. And Daphnis, a Sicilian shepherd who was said to be the inventor of pastoral poetry, is said to be a son or sometimes eromenos of Hermes.

==== List of offspring ====
The following is a list of Hermes's offspring, by various mothers. Beside each offspring, the earliest source to record the parentage is given, along with the century to which the source (in some cases approximately) dates.

Offspring	Mother	Source	Date
Cydon	Acacallis	Paus.	2nd cent. AD
Ceryx	Aglaurus	Paus.	2nd cent. AD
Ceryx	Herse		
Ceryx	Pandrosus		
Bounos	Alcidameia	Paus.	2nd cent. AD
Echion	Antianeira		
Echion	Laothoe	Orph. Arg.	4th cent. AD
Eurytus	Antianeira		
Hermaphroditus	Aphrodite	Diod. Sic.	1st cent. BC
Astacus	Astabe		
Autolycus	Philonis	Hes. Cat.	6th cent. BC
Autolycus	Chione	Hyg. Fab.	1st cent. AD
Autolycus	Stilbe	Schol. Il.	
Autolycus	Telauge	Eustathius	12th cent. AD
Myrtilus	Cleobule		
Myrtilus	Clymene	Pherecydes	5th cent. BC
Myrtilus	Clytie	Hyg. De astr.	1st cent. BC/AD
Myrtilus	Myrto	Pherecydes	5th cent. BC
Myrtilus	Phaethusa	Pherecydes	5th cent. BC
Myrtilus	Theobule	Hyg. Fab.	1st cent. AD
Polybus	Chthonophyle	Paus.	2nd cent. AD
Eleusis	Daeira	Paus.	2nd cent. AD
Pan	Daughter of Dryope	HH 19	
Pan	Penelope	Hdt.	5th cent. BC
Norax	Erytheia	Paus.	2nd cent. AD
Aethalides	Eupolemeia	Hyg. Fab.	1st cent. AD
The Cephalonians	Calypso	Hes. Cat.	6th cent. BC
Daphnis	Unnamed nymph	Diod. Sic.	1st cent. BC
Cephalus	Herse	Apollod.	1st/2nd cent. AD
Gigas	Hiereia	Tzetzes	12th cent. AD
Evander	Themis	Dion. Hal.	1st cent. BC
Prylis	Issa	Schol. Lyc.	
Lycus, Pherespondus, Pronomus	Iphthime	Nonnus	5th cent. AD
Libys	Libye	Hyg. Fab.	1st cent. AD
Caicus	Ocyrhoe	Ps.-Plut. Fluv.	2nd cent. AD
Nomios	Penelope (dryad)		
Pharis	Phylodameia	Paus.	2nd cent. AD
Eudoros	Polymele	Hom. Il.	8th cent. BC
Saon	Rhene	Diod. Sic.	1st cent. BC
Linus	Urania	Suda	10th cent. AD
Agreus	Sose		
Abderus	Unnamed mortal woman	Apollod.	1st/2nd cent. AD
Arabus	Thronia	Hes. Cat.	6th cent. BC
Damaskos	Halimede	Steph. Byz.	6th cent. AD
Dolops	No mother mentioned		
Eurymachus	No mother mentioned	Schol. Il.	
Palaestra	No mother mentioned	Philostr.	3rd cent. AD
Angelia	No mother mentioned	Pindar	5th cent. BC

=== Genealogy ===
Hermes's family tree

Uranus	Gaia
Uranus's genitals	Iapetus	Oceanus	Tethys	Cronus	Rhea
Clymene	Pleione	Zeus	Hera	Poseidon	Hades	Demeter	Hestia
Atlas	a
b
Maia
Ares	Hephaestus
Hermes	Metis
Athena
Leto
Apollo	Artemis
Semele
Dionysus
Dione
a	b
Aphrodite

== In Jungian psychology ==
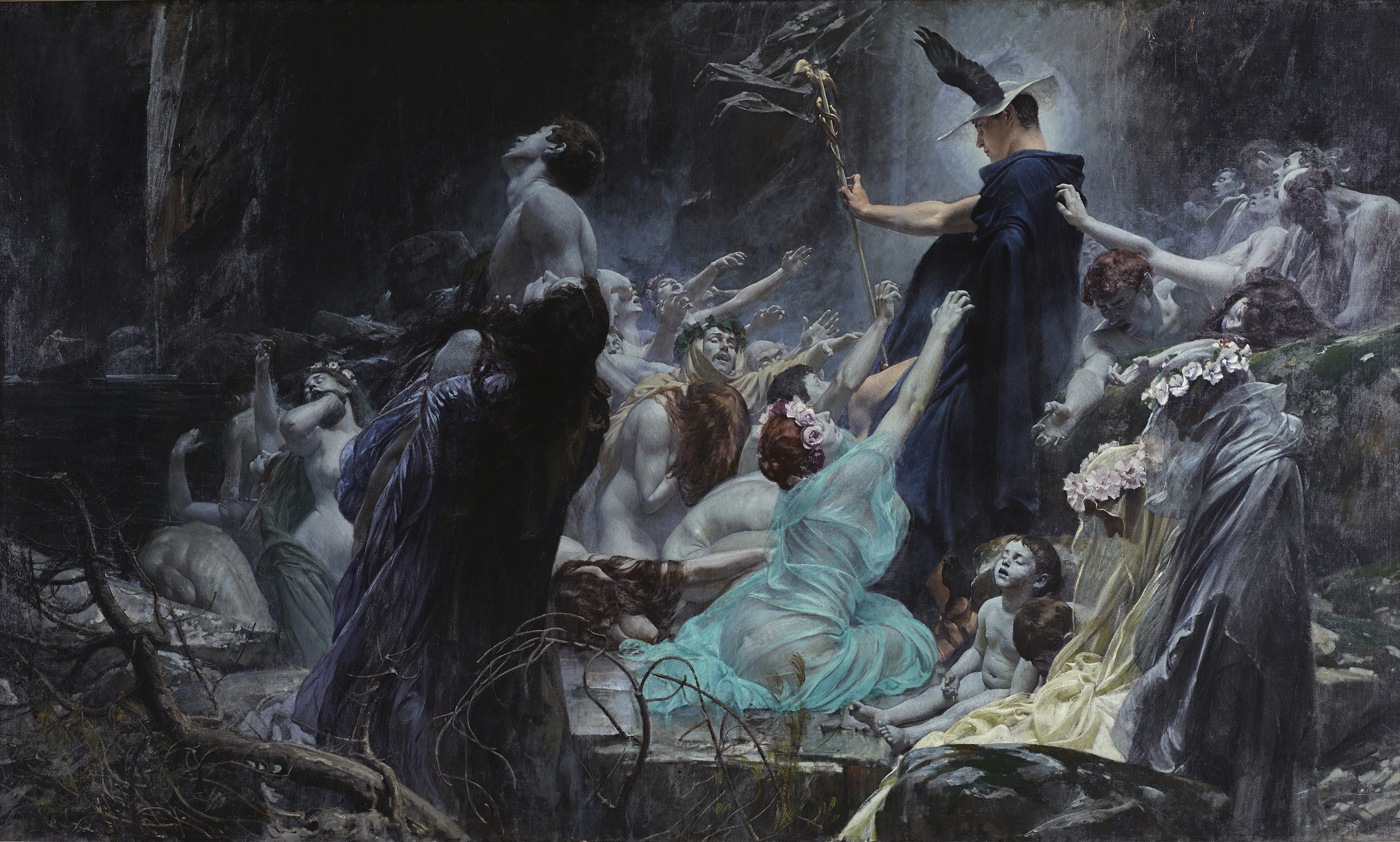
Souls on the Banks of the Acheron, oil painting depicting Hermes in the underworld. Adolf Hirémy-Hirschl, 1898

For Carl Jung, Hermes's role as messenger between realms and as guide to the underworld made him the god of the unconscious, the mediator between the conscious and unconscious parts of the mind, and the guide for inner journeys. Jung considered the gods Thoth and Hermes to be counterparts. He emphasized Hermes's central role in the practice of medieval alchemy, which Jung believed to be symbolic of the psychological process he called individuation. In Jungian psychology especially, Hermes is seen as relevant to study of the phenomenon of synchronicity (together with Pan and Dionysus):

Hermes is an archetypal figure, a potential in every human psyche ...

— D. L. Merritt

He is identified by some with the archetype of healer, as the ancient Greeks ascribed healing magic to him.

In the context of abnormal psychology Samuels (1986) states that Jung considers Hermes the archetype for narcissistic disorder; however, he lends the disorder a "positive" (beneficious) aspect, and represents both the good and bad of narcissism.

For López-Pedraza, Hermes is the protector of psychotherapy. For McNeely, Hermes is a god of the healing arts.

According to Christopher Booker, all the roles that Hermes held in ancient Greek thought, all considered, reveal Hermes to be a guide or observer of transition.

For Jung, Hermes's role as trickster made him a guide through the psychotherapeutic process.

== Hermes in popular culture ==
See Greek mythology in popular culture

== See also ==
- Hermes Trismegistus
- Family tree of the Greek gods
