= Zaraka Monastery =

Frankish abbey in the Peloponnese, Greece

- Μονή Ζάρακα (Greek)
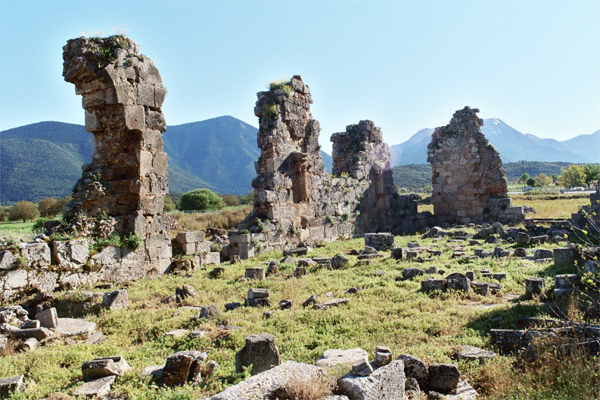
- The ruins of the monastery

- Location within Greece
- 37°52′01″N 22°27′29″E
- Type: Monastery
- Periods: Medieval Greece
- Location: Stymfalia, Corinthia, Peloponnese, Greece

History
- Built: Approximately 1225
- Built by: Cistercian Order
- Abandoned: 1276

Site notes
- Management: 25th Ephorate of Byzantine Antiquities
- Public access: Yes
- Website: Monastery of Zaraka

Zaraka Monastery is a ruined Frankish abbey near Stymfalia, in the Peloponnese, in Greece. It was built about a kilometre from the shores of Lake Stymphalia, the site of the ancient city of Stymphalus, during the "Frankokratia", i.e. the occupation of parts of the Byzantine Empire by Franks and Venetians, following the events of the Fourth Crusade in 1204, and the establishment of the Latin Empire of Constantinople and Greece.

== History ==
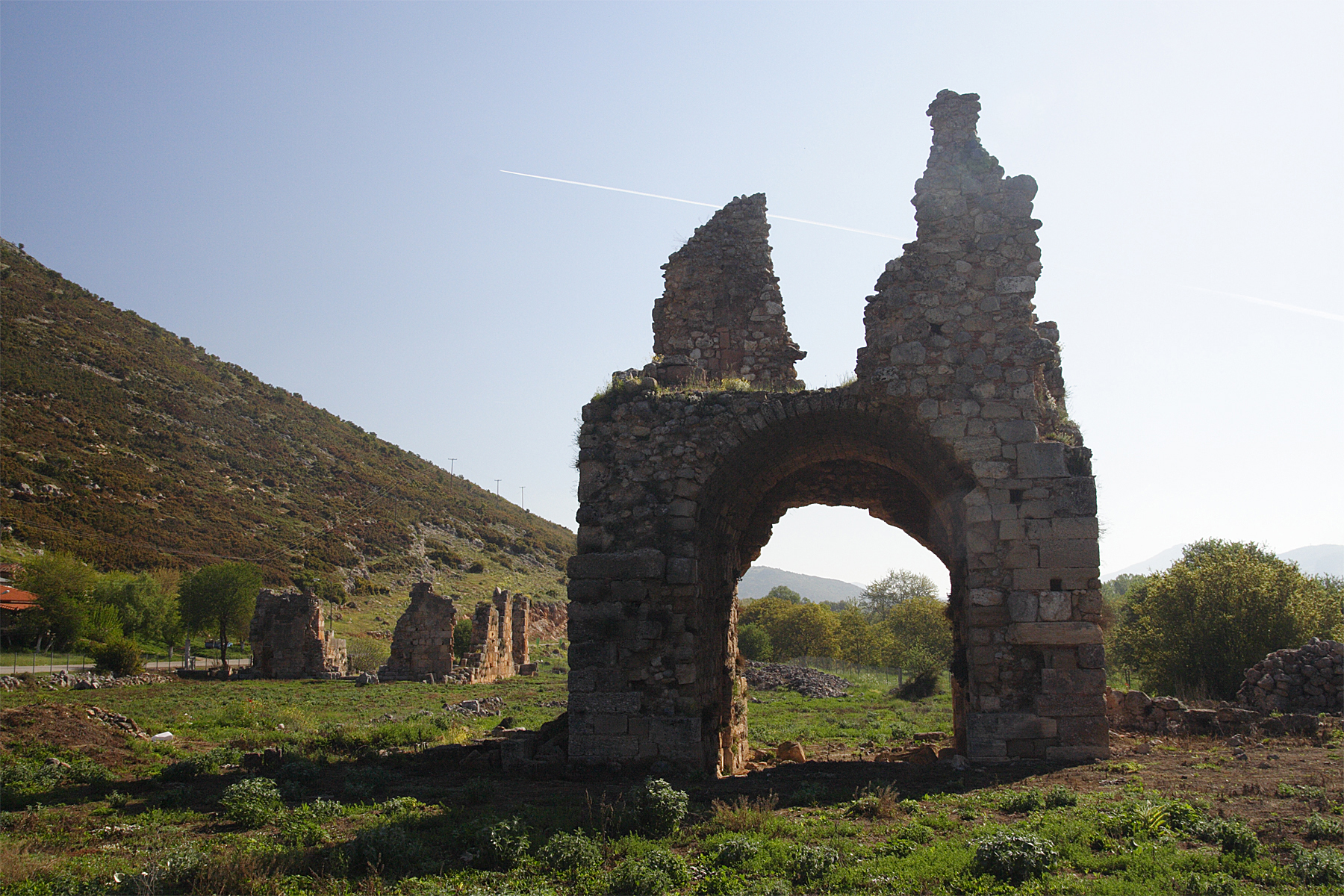
Ruins of the monastery

The monastery was founded by monks of the Cistercian Order in c. 1225. It is one of the few examples of western Gothic architecture in Greece, along with the monastery of Isova in the western Peloponnese (just north of the village of Trypiti) and the church of Saint Sophia at Andravida. It was initially excavated by Professor Anastasios Orlandos in the 1920s and then by Eustathios Stikas in the 1960s. A joint project by the Canadian Institute at Athens and the Archaeological Society of Athens prepared the first detailed state plan of the church in 1984. Excavations from 1993 to 1996 by the Pontifical Institute of Medieval Studies at the University of Toronto uncovered areas around the church, the gate house, and the now vanished cloister.

The monastery makes sporadic appearance in the Statutes of the Cistercian General Chapter and it was one of the houses granted special exemption from the compulsory annual attendance at the General Chapter, and along with the houses in Syria and the Crusader States it was only required to attend once every seven years. The monastery was abandoned in 1276.

The main surviving structures are the imposing vaulted gate house and the church, especially its western end as well as parts of the defensive wall around the monastery. Excavation to the NE of the east end of the church (possibly a narthex was originally planned but never completed) revealed an arched entrance probably to the refectory which had fallen in an earthquake. The PIMS excavations demonstrated that the abbey was resettled in the late 14th century and inhabited perhaps intermittently until the mid 16th century. A number of graves from this later reoccupation were excavated in and around the cloister, including a headless man and one with a German banker's token of the mid 16th century.

== Sources ==
- A. Bon, La Morée franque: Recherches historiques, topographiques, et archéologiques sur la principauté d'Achaïe (École française d'Athènes 1969).
- E. A. R. Brown "The Cistercians in the Latin Empire of Constantinople and Greece, 1204-1276", Traditio 14 (1958), pp. 63–120.
- S. Campbell, ed. The Cistercian Monastery of Zaraka, Greece (Western Michigan University, Medieval Institute Publications 2018).
- B. M. Kitsiki Panagopoulos, Cistercian and Mendicant Monasteries in Medieval Greece (University of Chicago Press, 1979).
- P. Lock, The Franks in the Aegean, 1204–1500 (Longman, 1995).
- M. Olympios and C. Schabel, "The Cistercian Abbeys of Zaraka and Isova in the Principality of Achaia", Frankokratia 1 (2020), pp. 165–179.
- K. E. Salzer, "Gatehouses and Mother Houses: A Study of the Cistercian Abbey of Zaraka", Mediaeval Studies 61 (1999), pp. 297–324.
- D. H. Williams, The Cistercians in the Early Middle Ages, 1098–1348 (Gracewing, 1998).
