= Hercules Killing the Stymphalian Birds =

1500 painting by Albrecht Dürer

- Ercole uccide gli uccelli di Stinfalo (Italian)
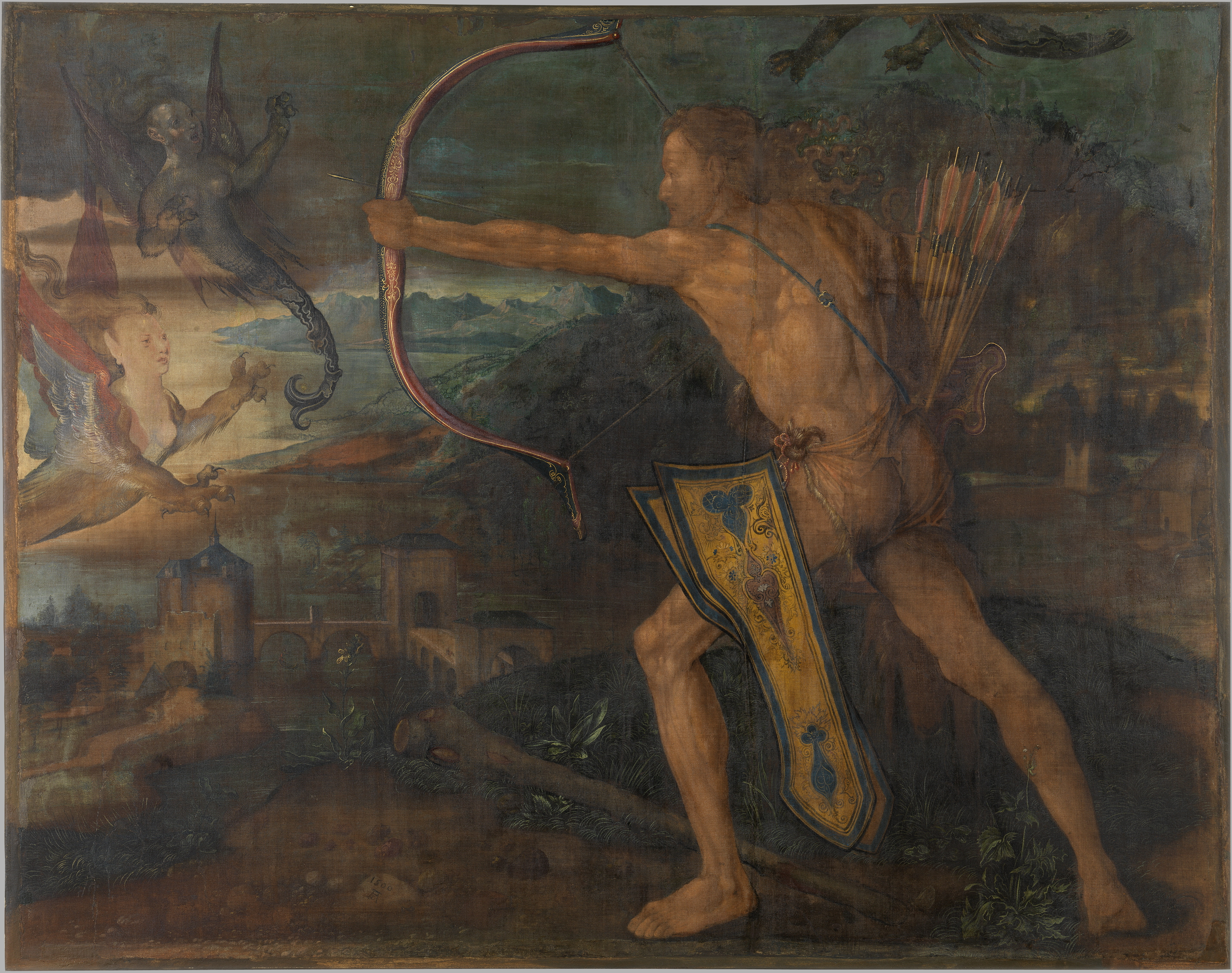
- Artist: Albrecht Dürer
- Year: 1500
- Dimensions: 87 cm × 110 cm (34 in × 43 in)
- Location: Germanisches Nationalmuseum; Nuremberg

Hercules Killing the Stymphalian Birds is a 1500 tempera on canvas painting by Albrecht Dürer, now kept in the Germanisches Nationalmuseum in Nuremberg.

== History ==
Dürer's only painting of a mythological subject, Hercules Killing the Stymphalian Birds was probably commissioned for Frederick the Wise for a room in the Schloss Wittenberg, which contains other paintings of the Labours of Hercules.

== Description and style ==
Hercules, armed with bow and arrow, is ready to shoot at two winged monsters that appear to his right. He occupies the center of the scene. His composition is probably derived from Italian prints, like Hercules and Deianira by Antonio del Pollaiuolo. Even the landscape in the background follows Italian examples, with its dark palette and brilliant reds representing the deadly swamps of Lake Stymphalia.

The monstrous birds, harpies, probably come from Dante's description of harpies as bizarre hybrid creatures.

== See also ==
- List of paintings by Albrecht Dürer
- Stymphalian birds

== Bibliography ==
- Costantino Porcu (edited by), Dürer, Rizzoli, Milan 2004.
