= Isova =

Ruined monastery in Elis, Greece

Coordinates: 37°34′29″N 21°46′48″E

Isova is the site of a ruined Frankish monastery near the modern village of Trypiti (formerly Bitzibardi) in the western Peloponnese, Greece. The church of Notre Dame at Isova, built in the first half of the 13th century, is among the best surviving examples of Gothic architecture in the Peloponnese, along with the church of Saint Sophia at Andravida and the monastery of Zaraka at Stymphalia.

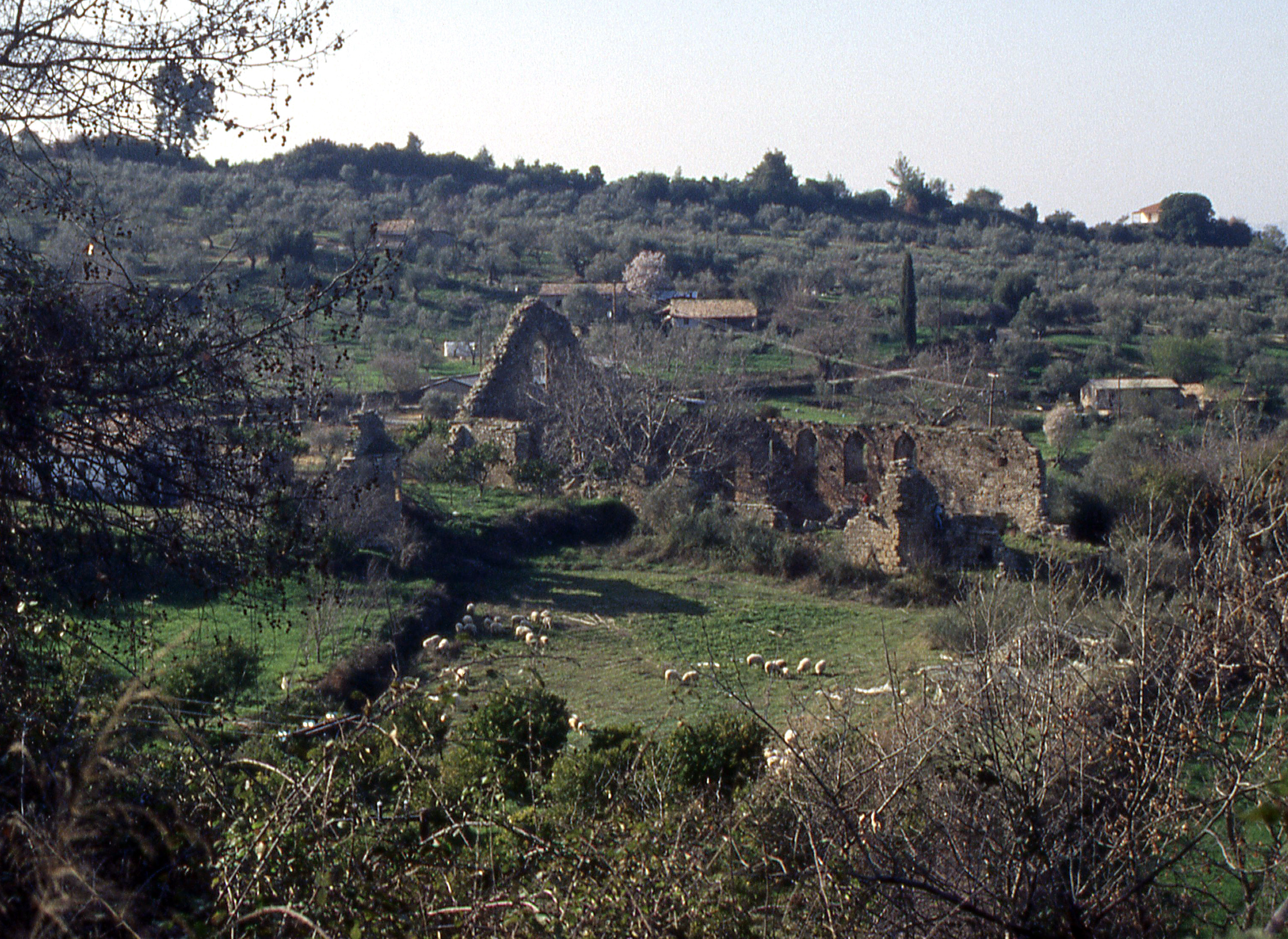
The ruins of the monastery at Isova in 1993

== Foundation ==
The Frankish monastery at Isova was founded some time after 1205, when the French Principality of Achaea was created in southern Greece in the wake of the Fourth Crusade, and before 1263, when the abbey was destroyed by fire (see below). Although the religious order responsible for the monastery is not recorded, it is now generally believed to have been a Cistercian foundation. The Cistercians were active in the Fourth Crusade and established at least a dozen abbeys in Byzantine territories captured by the Crusaders, and there is archival evidence that specifically suggests Cistercian involvement in two monastic foundations in the Peloponnese itself during the early 13th century. One of these two Cistercian abbeys in the Peloponnese can be identified with certainty as the monastery of Zaraka at Stymphalia, in the archdiocese of Corinth. For the other, the monastery at Isova, in the archdiocese of Patras, appears to be the only known candidate.

== Architectural remains ==
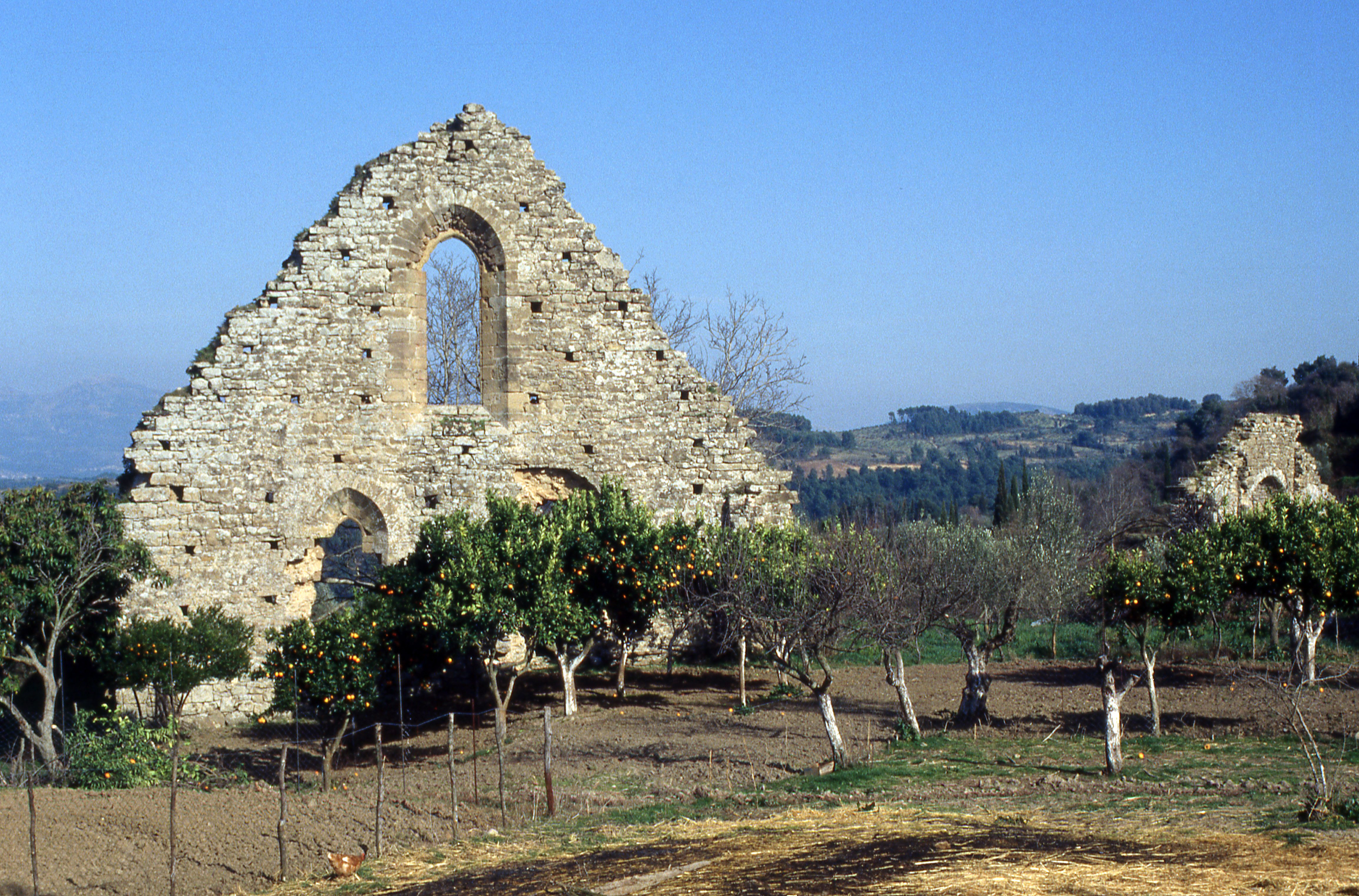
Remains of the churches of Notre Dame (left) and Saint Nicolas (right)

=== Notre Dame ===
The abbey church of Notre Dame consisted of single large rectangular hall, ca. 38.5 m long by 12.5 m wide (internal measurements), with a chancel at the eastern end projecting an additional ca. 8 m and ending in an octagonal apse supported by six external buttresses. The west and north walls are nearly intact; the south wall is partially destroyed and the east end is barely preserved above the foundations. There is no evidence of internal supports dividing the interior into nave and aisles, and no narthex or transept. The triangular gable of the west wall preserves the profile of the steeply pitched wooden roof, which apparently covered the entire width of the main hall in a single span, presumably with trusses, which were supported on simple corbels ca. 4 m apart in the side walls. A reused fragment of rib vaulting built into the wall of the later church of Saint Nicolas suggests that the chancel was roofed with a stone vault. The well-preserved windows in the north wall are single lancets (1.80 m high) topped by ogival arches. The west wall had two slightly larger windows (2.40 m high) below and a single much larger one (3.60 m high) in the gable. A small fragment of stone tracery found nearby may indicate that the windows in the chancel were larger and more elaborate, with two lights surmounted by a cinquefoil. Traces of abutting walls and supports for floor and roof beams in the exterior north wall of the church show that the cloister and other monastery buildings were located on that side, although no remains of these are visible today. In plan, architectural style, and construction technique the church belongs entirely to the western European Gothic tradition, without any sign of Byzantine influence, and it has been suggested that it was not merely designed but actually built by western craftsmen, if not by the monks themselves.

According to the 14th-century Chronicle of the Morea, the church was destroyed by fire in 1263, shortly before the battle of Prinitza, by a band of Turkish mercenaries fighting alongside Greek forces in an attempt to restore Byzantine control over the Peloponnese.

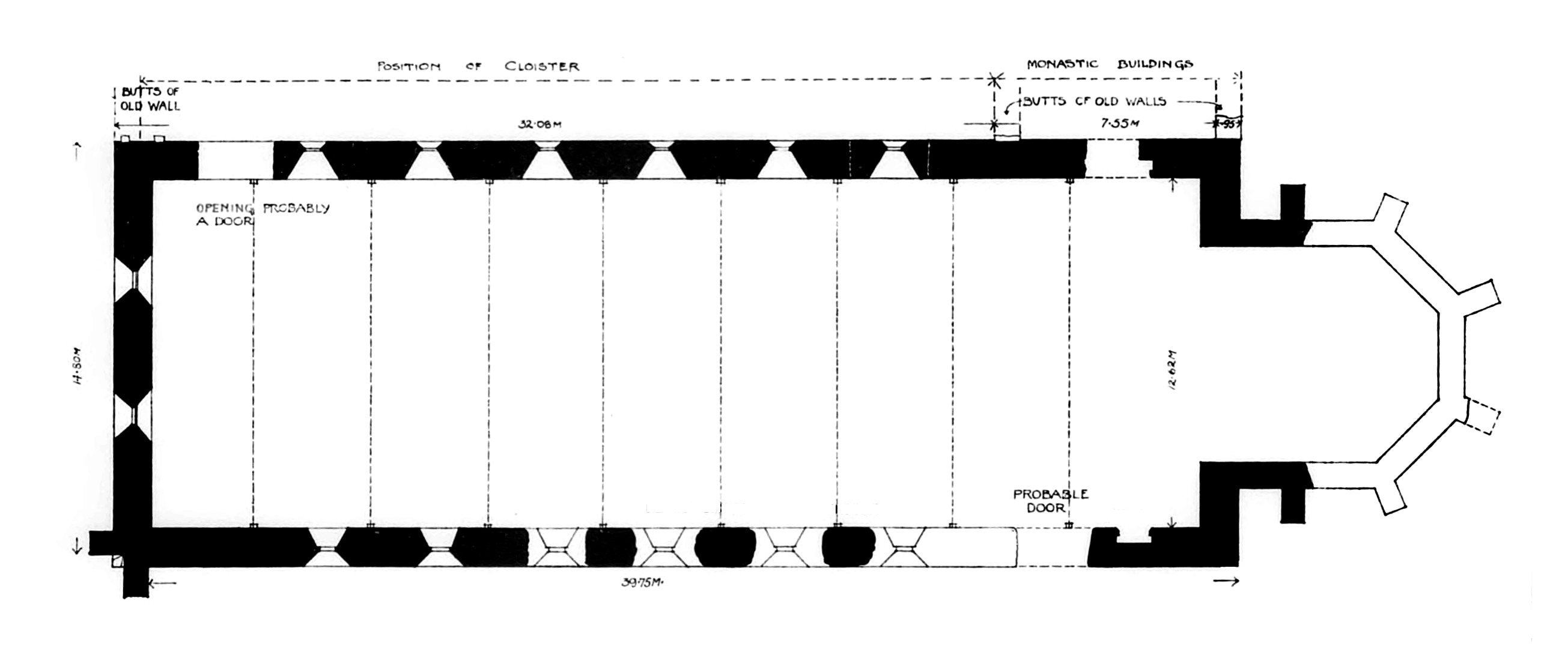
Plan

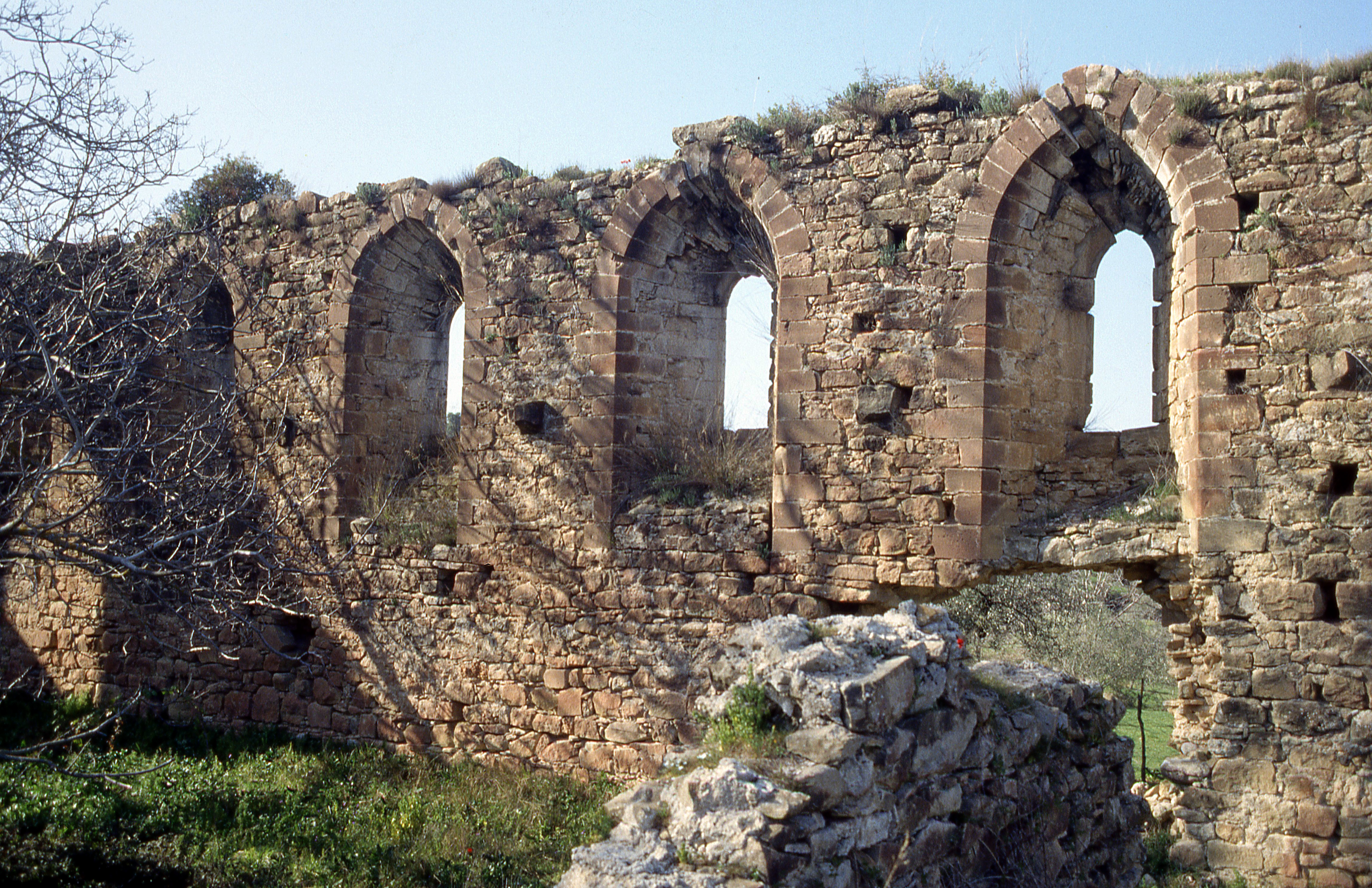
North wall, interior

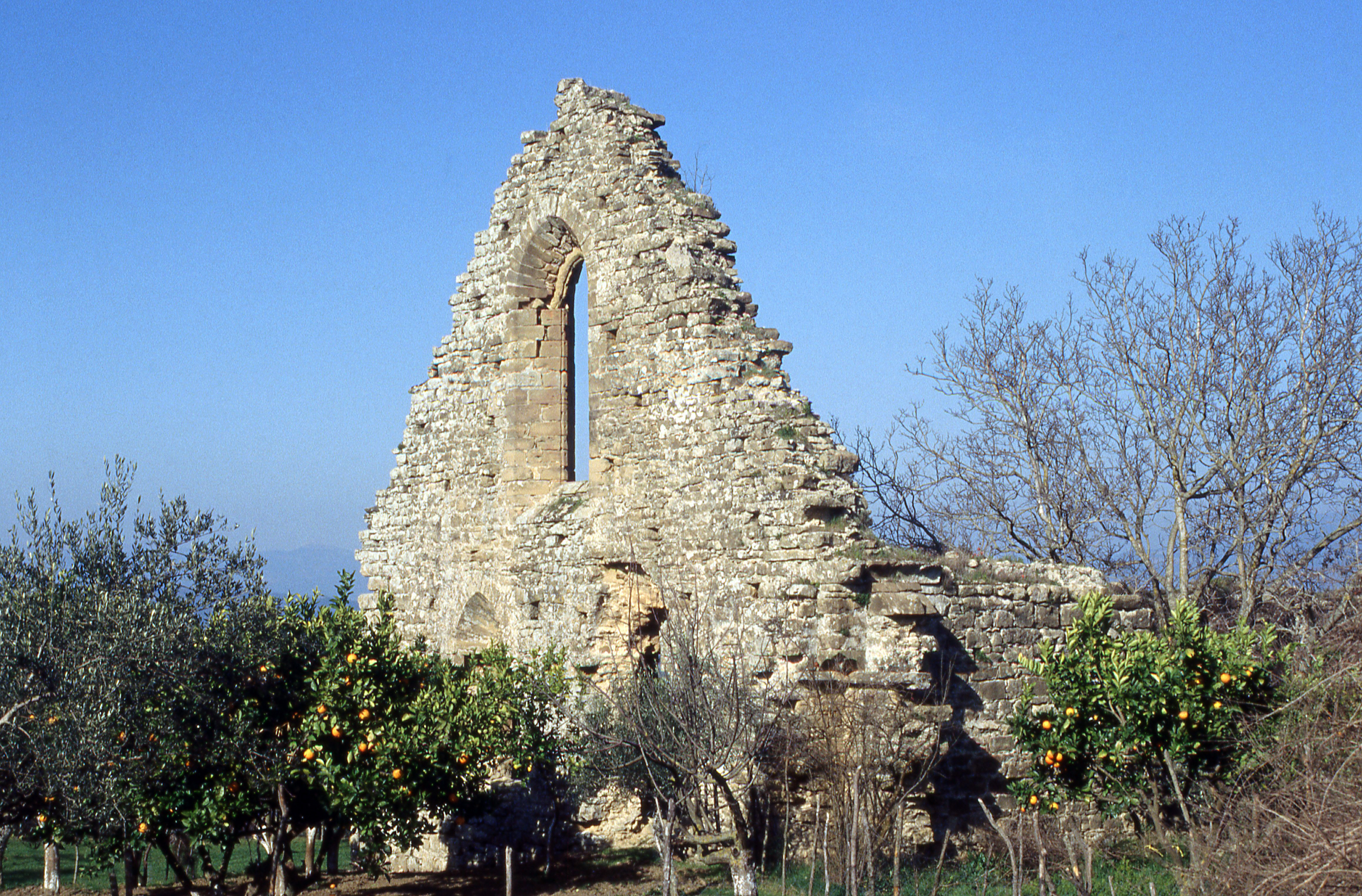
West wall, exterior

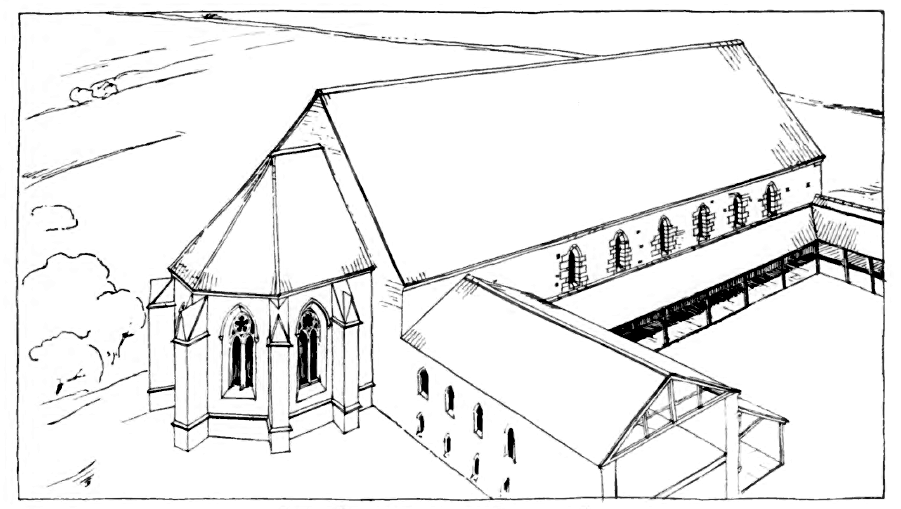
Reconstruction by R. Traquair

=== Saint Nicolas ===
The church of Notre Dame was not restored after the conflagration of 1263, but some time later a second, much smaller church, dedicated to Saint Nicolas (Ayios Nikolaos), was constructed ca. 20 m. south of the ruins of its predecessor. The church is nearly square in plan, ca. 10 m on a side. The interior was divided into a nave and two aisles by arcades supported on two pairs of piers or columns, the bases of which survive: one pair was located in the center of the church, the other at the eastern end on either side of the central apse. Three apses are visible in the well-preserved eastern wall: a larger central apse at the end of the nave (which is the only one that projects on the exterior of the building), flanked by two shallower apses at the ends of the side aisles. The windows in the two side apses are single lights topped by ogival arches; the window in the central apse, no longer preserved, was larger, with two lights. There was no narthex; three doors in the western wall provided entrance directly into the church. The roof was of wood, presumably with a clerestory over the central nave. Unlike the purely Gothic Notre Dame, the church of Saint Nicolas displays a mixture of Byzantine and Gothic features: the construction techniques, square plan, and triple apses suggest Byzantine architectural influence, but the tripartite basilical arrangement of the interior is a western feature and many of the architectural details, such as the pointed arches of the windows and the bases of the piers or columns separating the nave and aisles, are Gothic. Since there is no trace of an iconostasis dividing the nave from the sanctuary, it seems clear that this church too was constructed for Catholic rather than Orthodox worship. Its date is uncertain: the fact it incorporates at least one fragment from the ruined church of Notre Dame (see above) shows that it must be later than 1263, but dates from the late 13th to the 15th century have been suggested.

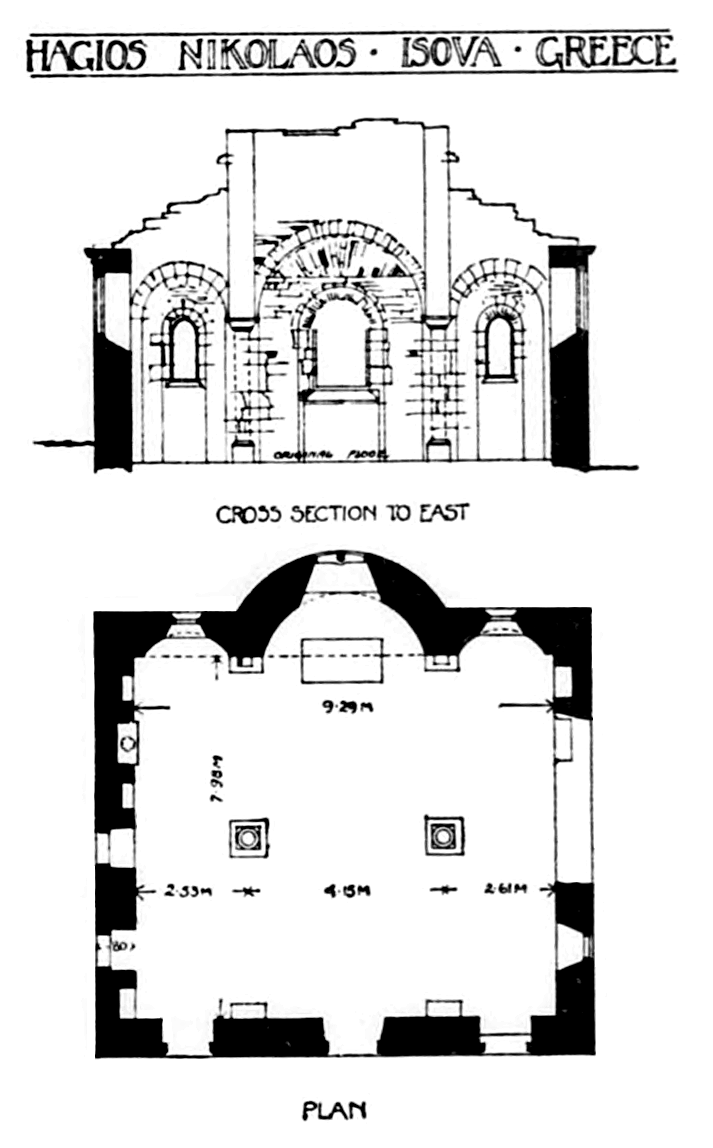
Plan and cross-section

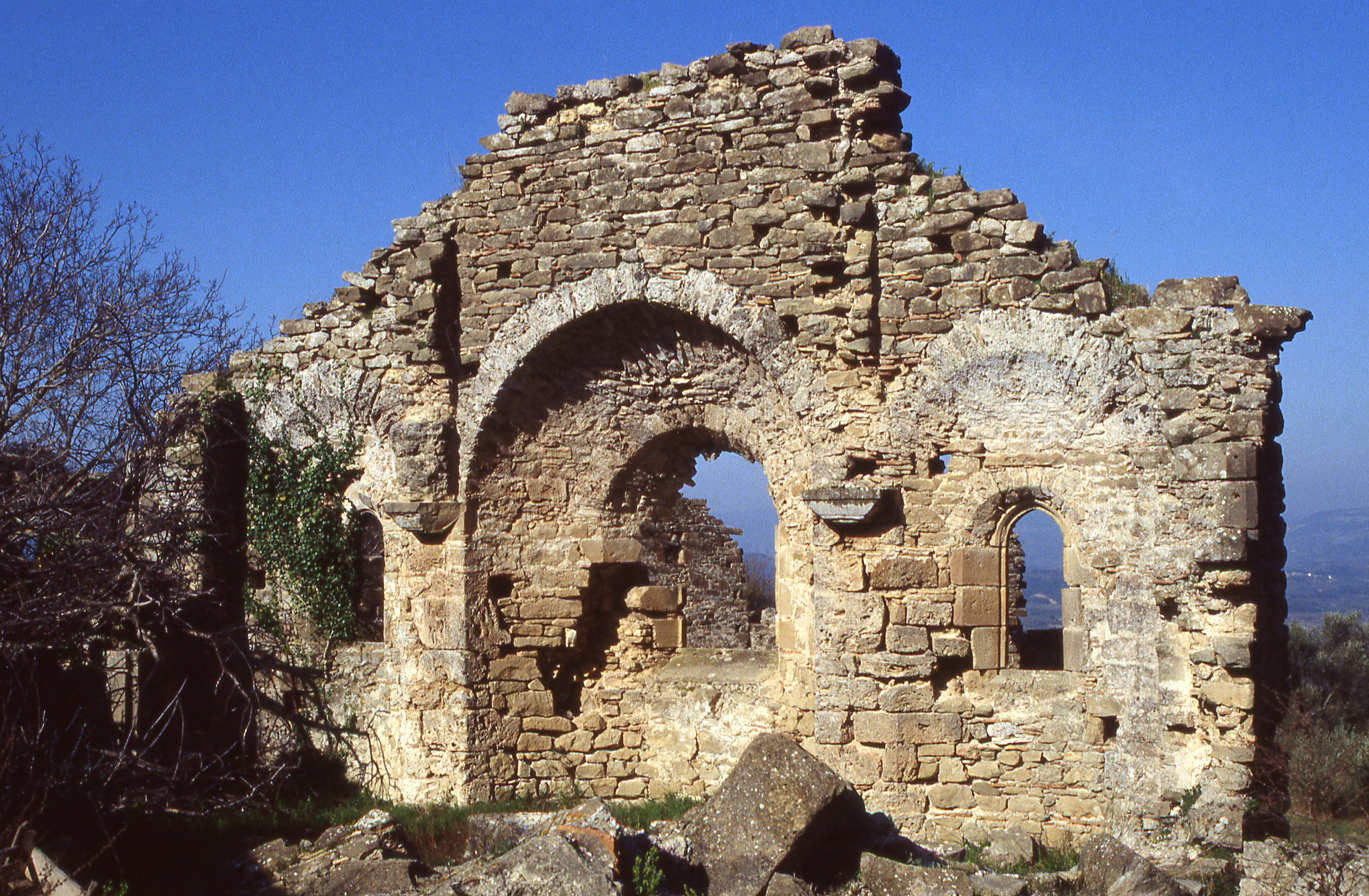
East wall, interior

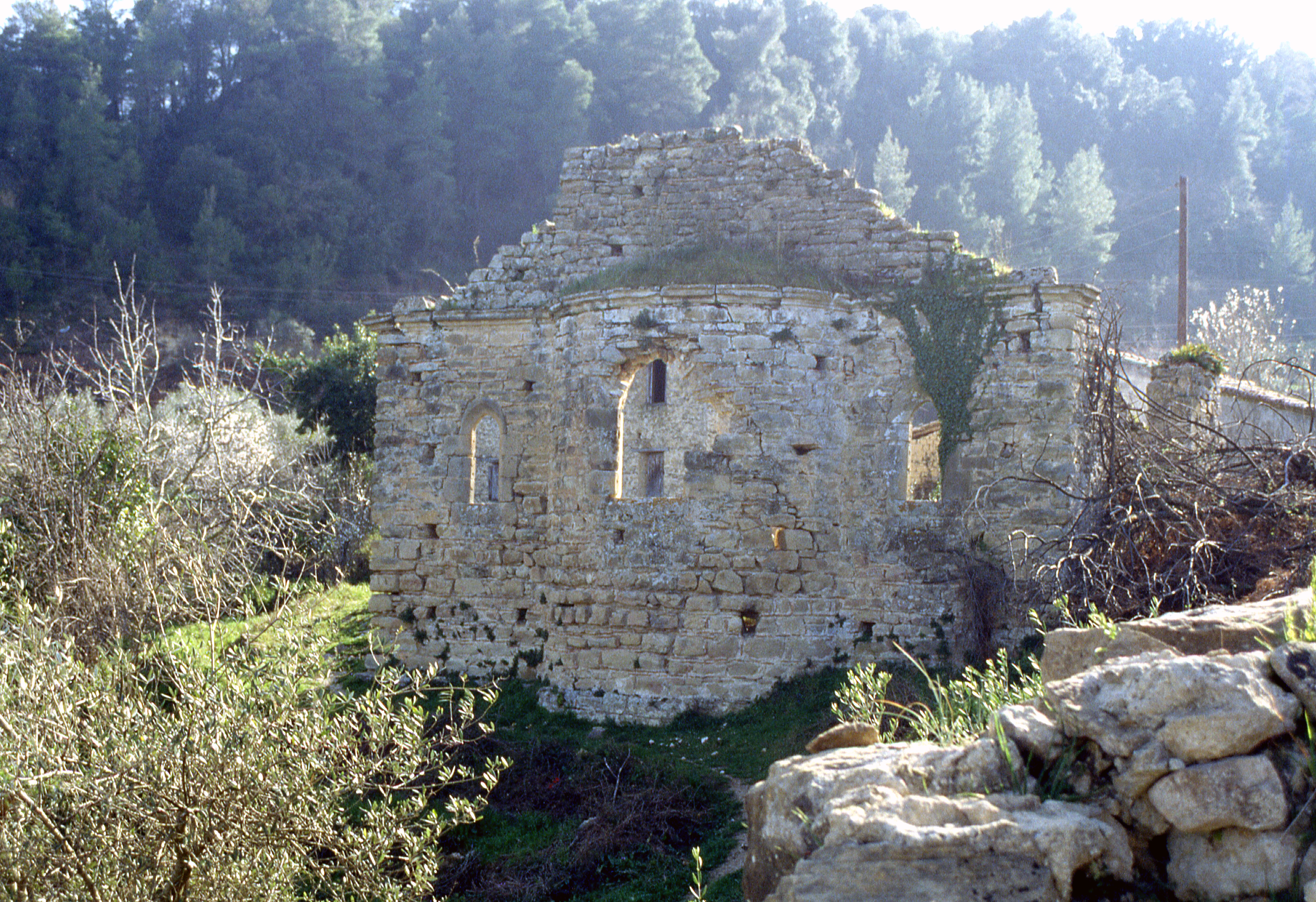
East wall, exterior

== List of references ==
- Bon, Antoine (1969). La Morée franque: Recherches historiques, topographiques, et archéologiques sur la principauté d'Achaïe. Paris: Ecole française d'Athènes.
- Brown, Elizabeth A. R. (1958). "The Cistercians in the Latin Empire of Constantinople and Greece, 1204–1276". Traditio. 14: 63–120. doi:10.1017/S0362152900010072. JSTOR 27830365.
- Campbell, Sheila, ed. (2018). The Cistercian Monastery of Zaraka, Greece. Kalamazoo: Western Michigan University, Medieval Institute Publications. ISBN 978-1-58044-244-2.
- Lock, Peter (1995). The Franks in the Aegean, 1204–1500. Harlow, Essex: Longman. ISBN 978-0582051393.
- Moutsopoulos, Nicholas (1956). "Le monastère franc de Notre-Dame d'Isova (Gortynie)". Bulletin de correspondance hellénique. 80: 76–94. doi:10.3406/bch.1956.2411.
- Olympios, Michalis; Schabel, Chris (2020). "The Cistercian Abbeys of Zaraka and Isova in the Principality of Achaia". Frankokratia. 1 (1–2): 165–179. doi:10.1163/25895931-12340001.
- Panagopoulos, Beata Maria (1979). Cistercian and Mendicant Monasteries in Medieval Greece. Chicago: University of Chicago Press. ISBN 978-0-226-64544-5.
- Salzer, Katherine E. (1999). "Gatehouses and Mother Houses: A Study of the Cistercian Abbey of Zaraka". Mediaeval Studies. 61: 297–324. doi:10.1484/J.MS.2.306465.
- Salzer, Katherine E. (2018). "The Political and Religious Context of the Frankish Morea". In Campbell, Sheila (ed.). The Cistercian Monastery of Zaraka, Greece. Kalamazoo: Western Michigan University, Medieval Institutue Publications. pp. 39–53. ISBN 978-1-58044-244-2.
- Traquair, Ramsay (1923). "Frankish Architecture in Greece". Journal of the Royal Institute of British Architects. 31 (2): 33–48.
