= Stymphalian Birds (Savva) =

Painting by Christoforos Savva

- Στυμφαλίδες Όρνιθες (Greek)
- Artist: Christoforos Savva
- Year: 1960
- Medium: oil on canvas
- Dimensions: 104 cm × 147 cm (41 in × 58 in)
- Location: State Gallery of Contemporary Cypriot Art; Nicosia

Stimfaliyski birds (Greek: Στυμφαλίδες Όρνιθες) is a 1960 painting by Cypriot artist and sculptor Christoforos Savva from 1960.

== Description ==
The image size is 104 x 147 cm.

It is part of the collection of the State Gallery of Contemporary Cypriot Art in Nicosia, Cyprus.

== Analysis ==
The painting is one of the most significant in the art of Cyprus.

Christoforos Savva played the role of a catalyst in the process of introducing and spreading abstract art in Cyprus and found common points between Cypriot and world art. The creation of "Stimfaliyski birds" drew the artist's inspiration from the Greek myth of the sixth labour of Hercules for Eurystheus. The destructive activity of the birds had been laying waste the shore of a Stymphalian swamp in Arcadia. With some help from a crotalum given to him by Athena, Hercules managed to kill some birds, and chase off the rest.

== See also ==
- Stymphalian birds
