= Stymphalus (Arcadia) =

Town in the northeast of ancient Arcadia

Coordinates: 37°51′34″N 22°27′34″E

Stymphalus or Stymphalos (Greek: Στύμφαλος) (Note: Or Stymphelus or Stymphelos (Στύμφηλος), or Stymphelum or Stymphelon (Στύμφηλον), or Stymphalum, or Stymphala) was a town in the northeast of ancient Arcadia.

== Location ==
The territory of Stymphalus is a plain, about six miles (9.7 km) in length, bounded by Achaea on the north, Sicyonia and Phliasia on the east, the territory of Mantineia on the south, and that of Orchomenus and Pheneus on the west. This plain is shut in on all sides by mountains. On the north rises the gigantic mass of Cyllene (possibly the mythical ‘rock of Scylla’), from which a projecting spur, called Mount Stymphalus (Στυμφαλος ὄρος), descends into the plain.

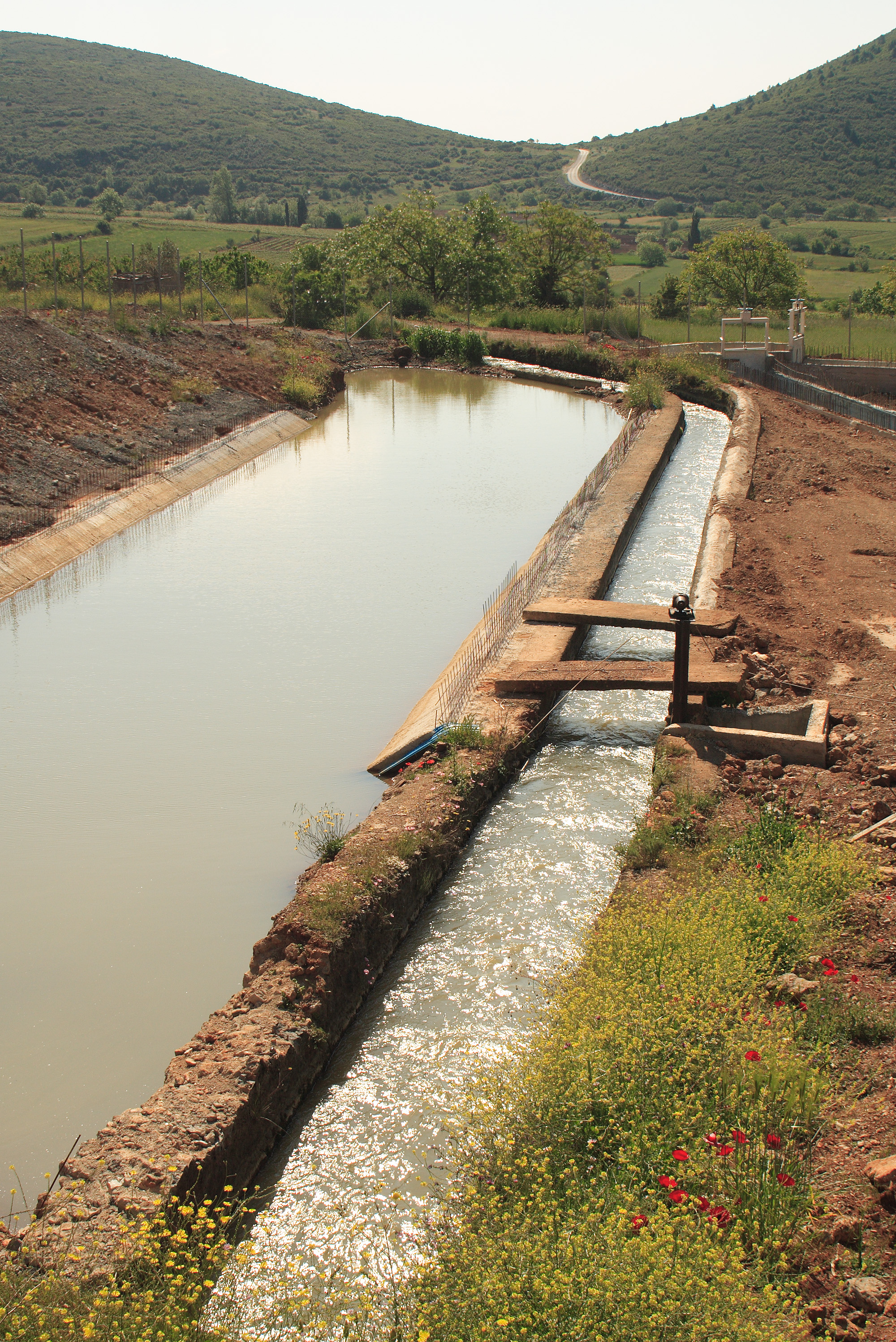
View of Hadrian's aqueduct

The mountain at the southern end of the plain, opposite Cyllene, was called Apelaurum (τὸ Ἀπέλαυρον), and at its foot is the subterranean outlet of the lake of Stymphalus (ἡ Στυμφαλὶς λίμνη or ἡ Στυμφηλίη λίμνη). This lake is formed partly by the rain-water descending from Cyllene and Apelaurum, and partly by three streams which flow into it from different parts of the plain. From the west descends a small stream, which rises in Mount Geronteium in the neighbourhood of Kastanía; and from the east comes another stream, which rises near Dusa. But the most important of the three streams is the one which rises on the northern side of the plain, from a copious subterranean outlet; this stream was called Stymphalus by the ancients; it was regarded by them as the principal source of the lake, and was universally believed to make its reappearance, after a subterranean course of 200 stadia, as the river Erasinus in Argolis.

The Stymphalii worshiped the Erasinus and Metope (Μετώπη), whence it has been concluded that Metope is only another name of the river Stymphalus. Metope is also mentioned by Callimachus, with the epithet πολύστενιος/πολύστειος ('pebbly'). The water, which formed the source of the Stymphalus, was conducted to Corinth by the emperor Hadrian, by means of an aqueduct, of which considerable remains may still be traced. Pausanias reported that the lake dried in summer; however, as there is no outlet for the waters of the lake except the subterranean outlet, a stoppage of this channel by stones, sand, or any other substance occasions an inundation. In the time of Pausanias (2nd century) there occurred such an inundation, which was ascribed to the anger of Artemis. The water was said to have covered the plain to the extent of 400 stadia; but this number is evidently corrupt, and we ought probably to read τεσσαράκοντα ('forty') instead of τετρακοσίους ('four hundred'). Strabo relates that Iphicrates, when besieging Stymphalus without success, attempted to obstruct the outlet, but was diverted from his purpose by a sign from heaven. Strabo also states that originally there was no subterranean outlet for the waters of the lake, so that the city, which was in his time 50 stadia from the lake, was originally situated upon its margin. But this is clearly an error, even if his statement refers to old Stymphalus, for the breadth of the whole lake is less than 20 stadia.

== History ==
The city derived its name from Stymphalus, a son of Elatus and grandson of Arcas; but the ancient city, in which Temenus, the son of Pelasgus, dwelt, had entirely disappeared in the time of Pausanias, and all that he could learn respecting it was, that Hera was formerly worshiped there in three different sanctuaries – as virgin, wife, and widow. The modern city lay upon the southern edge of the lake, about a mile and a half (2.5 km) from the outlet, and upon a rocky promontory connected with the mountains behind. Stymphalus is mentioned by Homer in the Catalogue of Ships in the Iliad as one of the places whose troops are led by Agapenor. It is also mentioned by Pindar, who calls it the mother of Arcadia. Its name does not often occur in the ancient historians, and it owes its chief importance to its being situated upon one of the most frequented routes leading to the westward from Argolis and Corinth. It was taken by Apollonides, a general of Cassander, and subsequently belonged to the Achaean League.

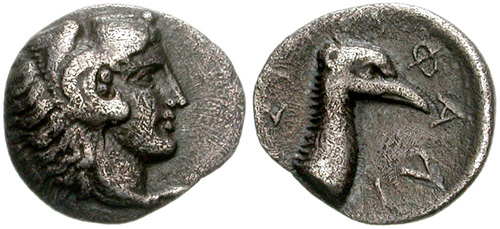
Silver obolus from Stymphalos depicting Heracles on the obverse and a Stymphalian bird and inscription ΣΤΥΜΦΑΛΙΑ on the reverse.

In the time of Pausanias it was included in Argolis. The only building of the city mentioned by Pausanias, was a temple of Artemis Stymphalia, under the roof of which were figures of the Stymphalian birds; while behind the temple stood statues of white marble, representing young women with the legs and thighs of birds. These birds, so celebrated in mythology, the destruction of which was one of the sixth labours of Heracles, are said by Pausanias to be as large as cranes. but resembling in form the ibis, only that they have stronger beaks, and not crooked like those of the ibis. On some of the coins of Stymphalus, they are represented exactly in accordance with the description of Pausanias.

Pindar mentions an Olympic victor in the mule-cart race (a man called Hagesias) in his sixth Olympian Ode, and urges the members of the choir to venerate their virginal Hera, who was apparently a survival of pre-Olympian religion. Pausanias mentions a statue of Dromeus, a long-distance runner from Stymphalus who won at twice at the Dolichos at the Panhellenic Games in 484 BCE and 480 BCE. The temple of Artemis seems still to have been in use in Roman times. One unusual aspect of the goddess is that her sanctuary is referred to in an inscription of the early 2nd century BCE as that of Brauronian Artemis, an Athenian cult. An inscription commemorating Stymphalian hospitality to the people of Elateia was to be set up in the agora of Elateia and in the sanctuary of Brauronian Artemis at Stymphalus. Cults of Demeter and Hermes are also epigraphically attested.

== Archaeology ==
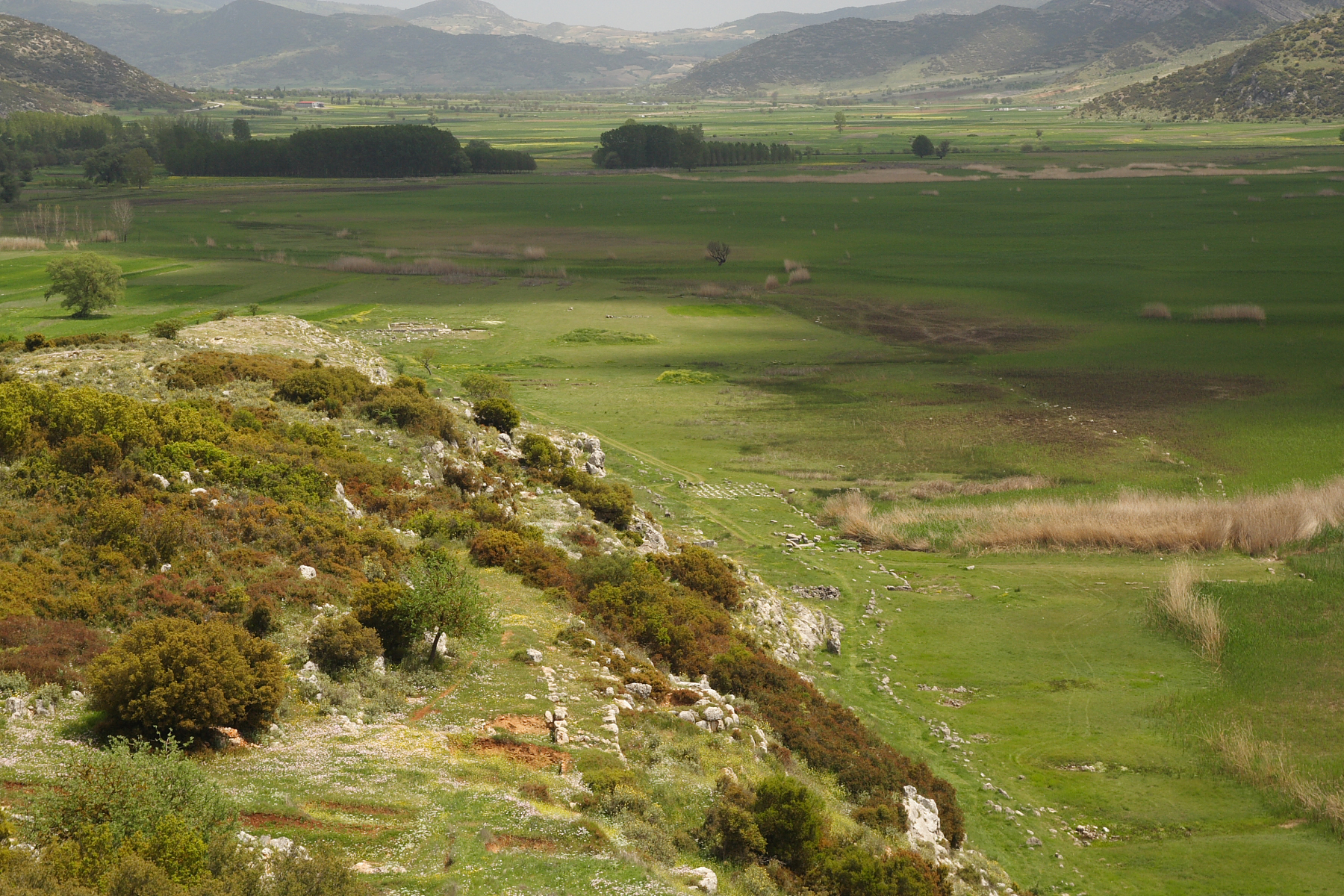
Archaeological site

Its site is located near the modern Stymfalia. Anastasios Orlandos excavated parts of the site for the Archaeological Society of Athens between 1924 and 1930. Since 1982, excavations of the site on the north shore of Lake Stymphalia have been under way, directed by Hector Williams for the University of British Columbia. Archaeological surveys and excavations have revealed a town refounded in the 4th century BCE; the Bronze Age and early classical Stymphalus has not been precisely located. The later city was laid out on a grid plan, with six-meter (19 ft) wide roads running north–south every thirty metres (98 feet), which intersected major east–west avenues at intervals over a hundred metres (300 ft). Houses have also been identified, as have a theatre, a palaestra, a fountain house, several temples, and the sanctuary, where an inscription preserving the letters POLIAD... ("of Athena Polias") – found by Orlandos in 1925, but now lost – seems to indicate Athena Polias as the divinity worshipped, though no further confirmation of this has been found. A graffito on a sherd from the site refers to the goddess of childbirth, Eilythyia. Large quantities of jewelry (mostly copper or bronze) suggest a sanctuary frequented by women; the partially preserved statue of a child supports the kourotrophic interpretation of the cult. In an annex to the temple, several dozen loom weights suggest the further presence of Athena in a weaving workshop. The sanctuary was destroyed, probably by the Romans in 146 BCE, but later seems to have been at least revisited to judge from early to mid-Roman pottery lamps from the area. Excavations in 14 other areas of the town have revealed modest remains of Hellenistic houses but a fine early Roman villa destroyed in an earthquake around 40 CE, perhaps occupied by descendants of Octavian's veterans who were settled in the northern Peloponnese after the battle of Actium. Marble furniture and fine painted wall plaster indicated a high standard of living. A cavalry sword and shield suggest the owner might have been a veteran officer of the Roman army. Elsewhere there is a substantial scene building from a theatre, a monumental propylon and a keyhole shaped building (perhaps an heroon to the city's legendary founder), and a still functioning fountain house of the 4th century BCE. Five small cemeteries of the late 4th to mid 6th centuries CE attest to small scale Late Roman and Early Byzantine settlement in the area although no architectural remains of houses or church have yet been found. Just north of the ancient city is the 13th c. Cistercian monastery of Zaraka, built by the Franks when they occupied much of Greece in the early 13th century. Excavations directed by Dr. Sheila Campbell of the University of Toronto revealed that although occupied by the monks for half a century (ca. 1225-1275 CE) and then abandoned it was resettled by unknown people in the late 14th c. CE and occupied into the 16th c.

== See also ==
- List of ancient Greek cities
