= Stymphalian birds =

Birds of Greek mythology

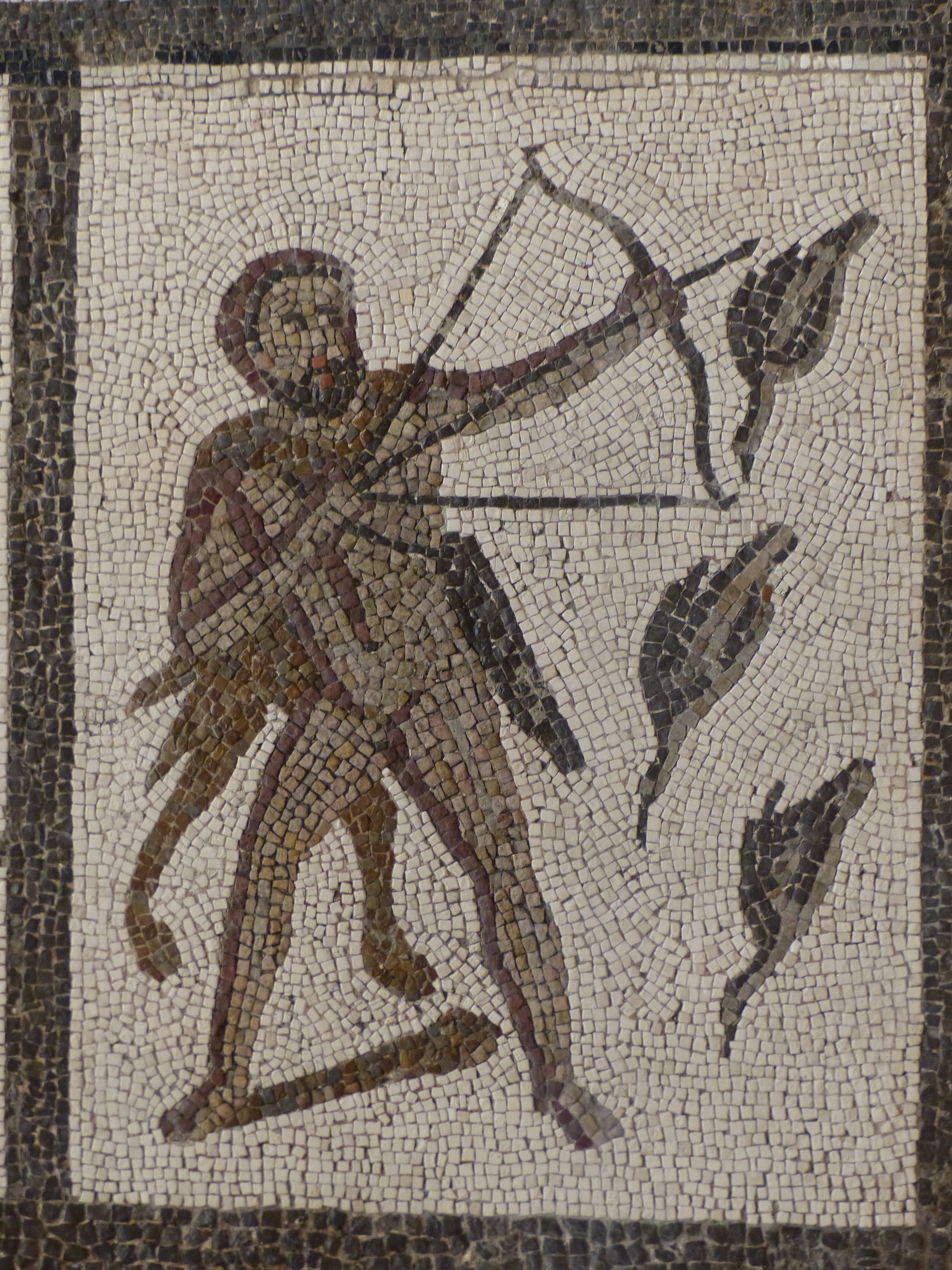
- Heracles and the Stymphalian birds. Detail of a Roman mosaic from Llíria (Spain).

Creature information
- Grouping: Legendary creature
- Sub grouping: Birds
- Folklore: Greek mythology

Origin
- Country: Greece
- Region: Arcadia
- Habitat: Lake Stymphalia

The Stymphalian birds (/stɪmˈfeɪliən/ stim-FAY-lee-ən; Ancient Greek: Στυμφαλίδες ὄρνιθες, romanized: Stymphalídes órnithes) are a group of voracious birds in Greek mythology. The birds' appellation is derived from their dwelling in a swamp in Stymphalia.

== Characteristics ==
The Stymphalian birds are man-eating birds with beaks of bronze, sharp metallic feathers they could launch at their victims, and poisonous dung.

These fly against those who come to hunt them, wounding and killing them with their beaks. All armour of bronze or iron that men wear is pierced by the birds; but if they weave a garment of thick cork, the beaks of the Stymphalian birds are caught in the cork garment, just as the wings of small birds stick in bird-lime. These birds are of the size of a crane, and are like the ibis, but their beaks are more powerful, and not crooked like that of the ibis.

— Pausanias. Description of Greece, 8.22.5

== Mythology ==
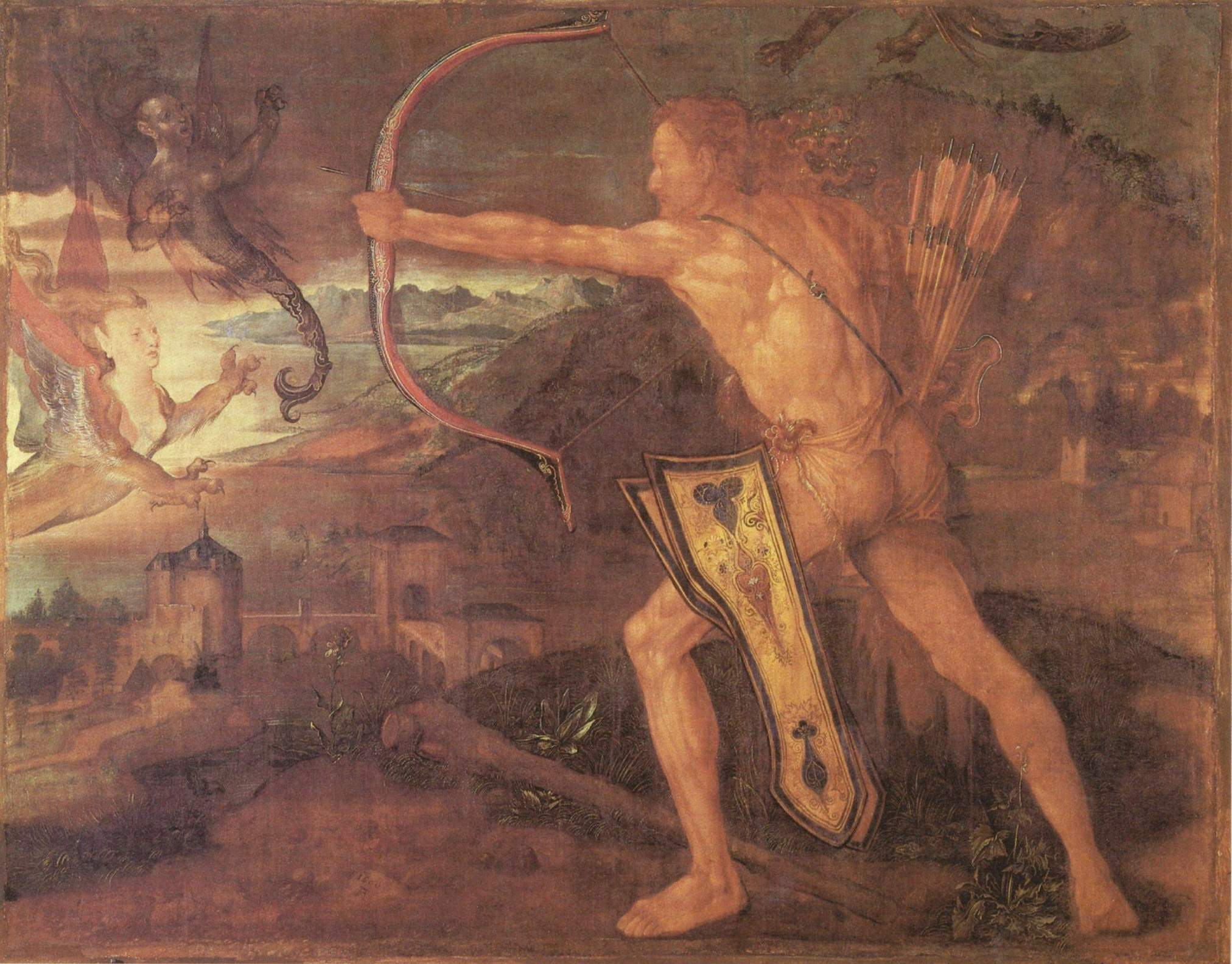
Hercules Killing the Stymphalian Birds by Albrecht Dürer, 1500.

These birds were pets of Artemis, the goddess of the hunt; or had been brought up by Ares, the god of war. They migrated to a marsh in Arcadia to escape a pack of wolves. There they bred quickly and swarmed over the countryside, destroying crops, fruit trees, and townspeople.

=== The Sixth Labour of Heracles ===
The Stymphalian birds were defeated by Heracles (Hercules) in his sixth labour for Eurystheus. Heracles could not go into the marsh to reach the nests of the birds, as the ground would not support his weight. Athena, noticing the hero's plight, gave Heracles a rattle called crotalum, which Hephaestus had made especially for the occasion. Heracles shook the crotalum (similar to castanets) on a certain mountain that overhung the lake and thus frightening the birds into the air. Heracles then shot many of them with feathered arrows tipped with poisonous blood from the slain Hydra. In some versions of this story this labour was discounted because of the help of Athena. The rest flew far away, never to plague Arcadia again. Heracles brought some of the slain birds to Eurystheus as proof of his success.

The surviving birds made a new home on the island of Aretias in the Euxine Sea. The Argonauts later encountered them there.

According to Mnaseas, they were not birds, but women and daughters of Stymphalus and Ornis, and were killed by Heracles because they did not receive him hospitably. In the temple of the Stymphalian Artemis, however, they were represented as birds, and behind the temple, there were white marble statues of maidens with birds' feet.

== Classical literature sources ==
Chronological listing of the main classical literature sources for the Stymphalian birds (not comprehensive):

- Sophocles, The Philoctetes, 1092 ff with the Scholiast (trans. Jebb) (Greek tragedy 5th century BC)

Regarding the Sophocles source, Jebb says Brunck reads "πτωκάδες" as "πλωάδες" which is an epithet given by Apollonius Rhodius to the Stymphalian birds in Argonautica 2. 1054.

- Apollonius Rhodius, Argonautica 2. 1054 ff (trans. Coleridge) (Greek epic poetry 3rd century BC)
- Mnaseas, Scholiast on Apoll. Rhod. 2.1054 (trans Mehler) (Greek history 3rd century BC)
- Diodorus Siculus, Library of History 3. 30. 4 (trans. Oldfather) (Greek history 1st century BC)
- Diodorus Siculus, Library of History 4. 13. 2
- Lucretius, Of The Nature of Things 5. Proem 1 (trans. Leonard) (Roman philosophy 1st century BC)
- Ovid, Metamorphoses 9. 187 ff (trans. Miller) (Roman epic poetry 1st century BC to 1st century AD)
- Strabo, Geography 8. 6. 8 (trans. Jones) (Greek geography 1st century BC to 1st century AD)
- Philippus of Thessalonica, The Twelve Labors of Hercules (The Greek Classics ed. Miller Vol 3 1909 p. 397) (Greek epigram 1st century AD)
- Seneca, Hercules Furens 243 ff (trans. Miller) (Roman tragedy 1st century AD)
- Seneca, Medea 771 ff (trans. Miller)
- Seneca, Phoenissae 420 ff (trans. Miller)
- Seneca, Hercules Oetaeus 17–30 (trans. Miller). (Roman tragedy 1st century AD)
- Seneca, Hercules Oetaeus 1237 ff
- Seneca, Hercules Oetaeus 1813 ff
- Statius, Thebaid 4. 100 ff (trans. Mozley) (Roman epic poetry 1st century AD)
- Statius, Thebaid 4. 292 ff
- Plutarch, Moralia, On the Fortune of Alexander, 341. 11 ff (trans. Babbitt) (Greek philosophy 1st century AD to 2nd century AD)
- Pseudo-Apollodorus, The Library 2. 5. 6 (trans. Frazer) (Greek mythography 2nd century AD)
- Pausanias, Description of Greece 5. 10. 9 (trans. Frazer) (Greek travelogue 2nd century AD)
- Pausanias, Description of Greece 8. 22. 4–5
- Pseudo-Hyginus, Fabulae 20 (trans. Grant) (Roman mythography 2nd century AD)
- Pseudo-Hyginus, Fabulae 30
- Quintus Smyrnaeus, Fall of Troy 6. 227 ff (trans. Way) (Greek epic poetry 4th century AD)
- Servius, In Vergilii Carmina Commentarii 8. 299 (trans. Thilo) (Greek commentary 4th century AD to 5th century AD)
- Nonnos, Dionysiaca 25. 242 ff (trans. Rouse) (Greek epic poetry 5th century AD)
- Nonnos Dionysiaca 29. 237 ff
- Boethius, The Consolation of Philosophy 4. 7. 13 ff (trans. Rand & Stewart) (Roman philosophy 6th century AD)
- Tzetzes, Chiliades or Book of Histories 2. 291 ff (trans. Untila et al.) (Greco-Byzantine history 12 century AD)
- Tzetzes, Chiliades or Book of Histories 2. 496 ff

== Gallery ==
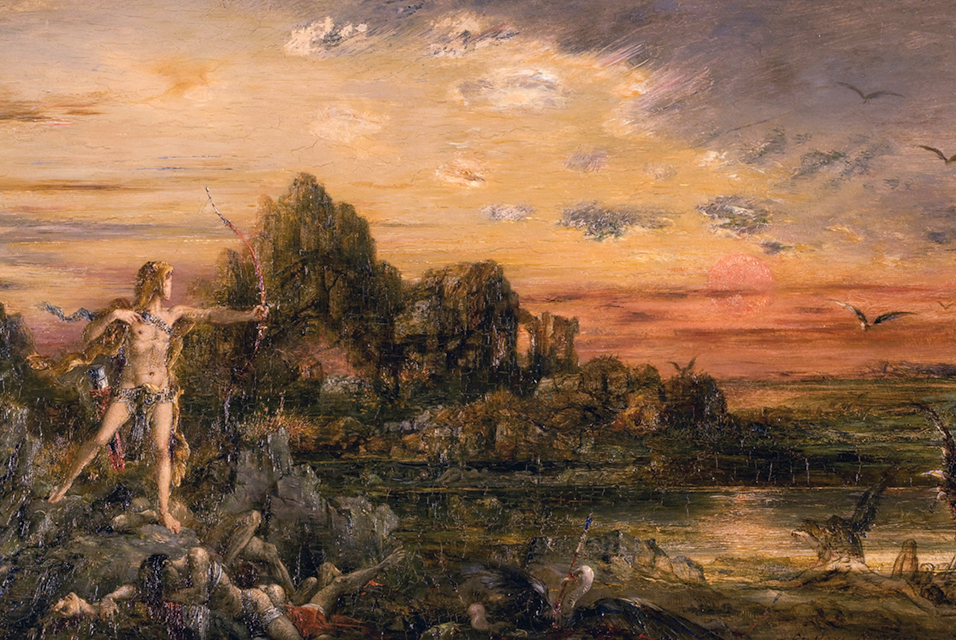
Hercules and the Stymphalian Birds' by Gustave Moreau, c 1872

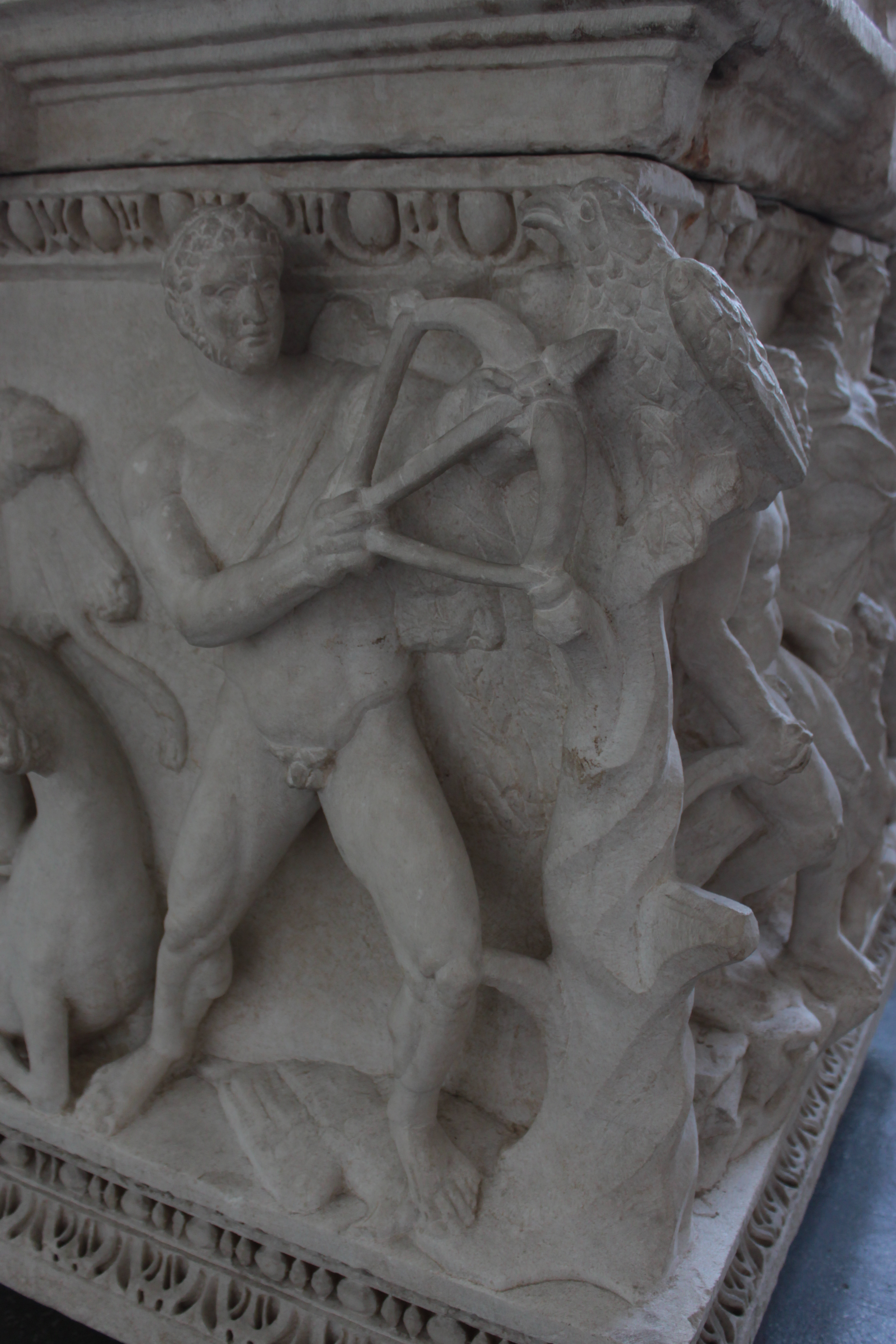
Kayseri Herakles Lahdi

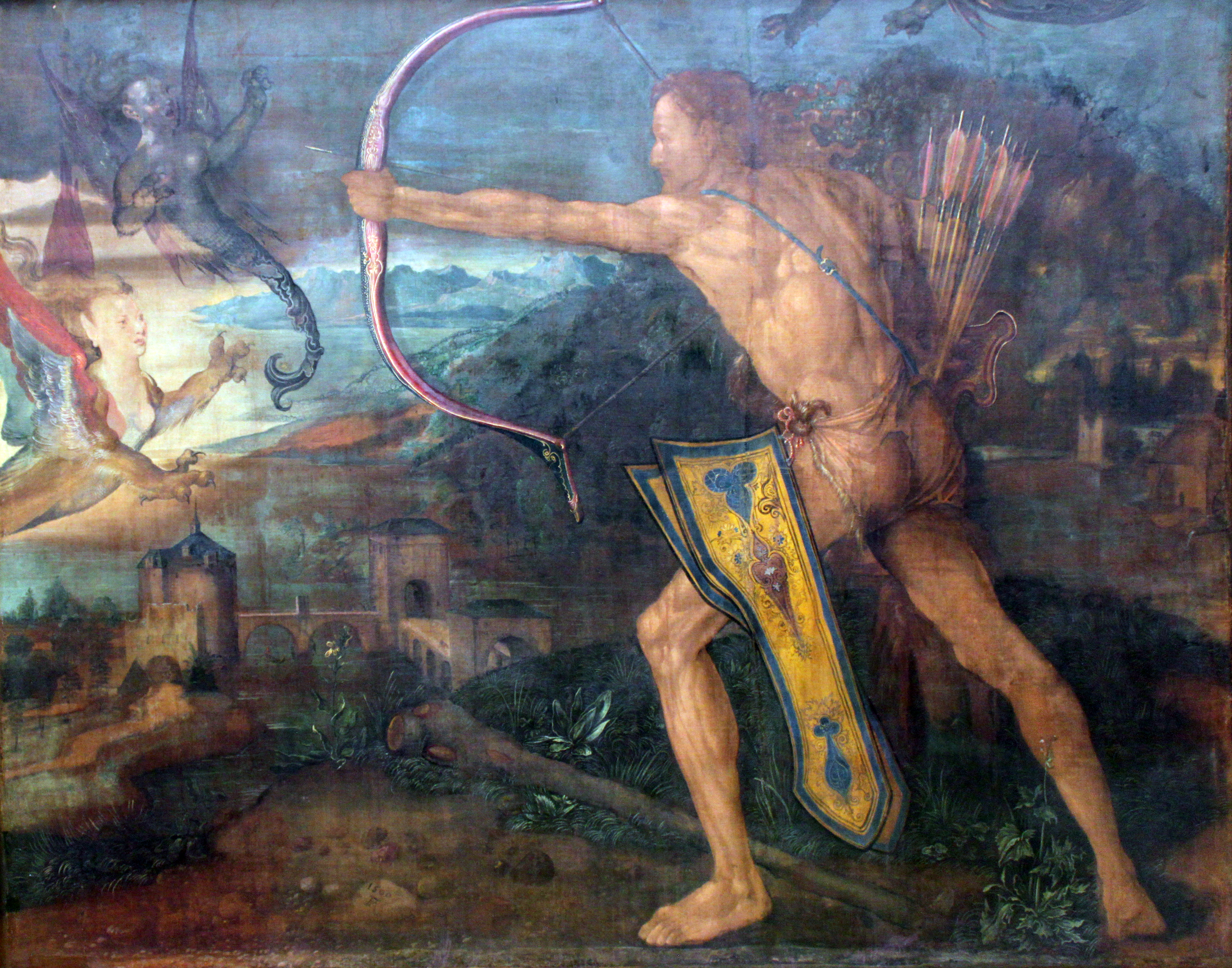
Hercules Killing the Stymphalian Birds by Albrecht Dürer (1500)

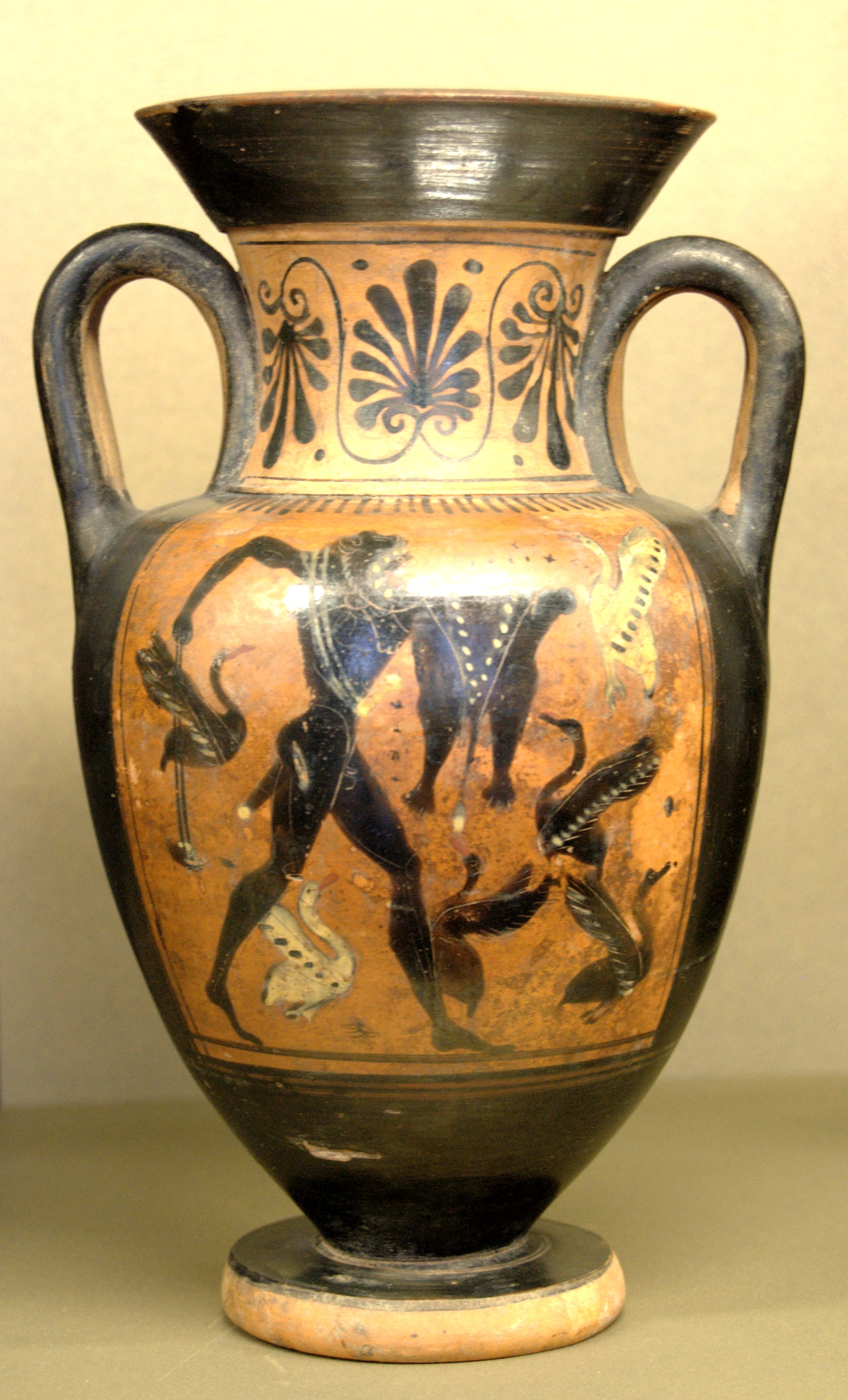
Heracles and the Stymphalian birds. Attic black-figure amphora, 500-490 BC

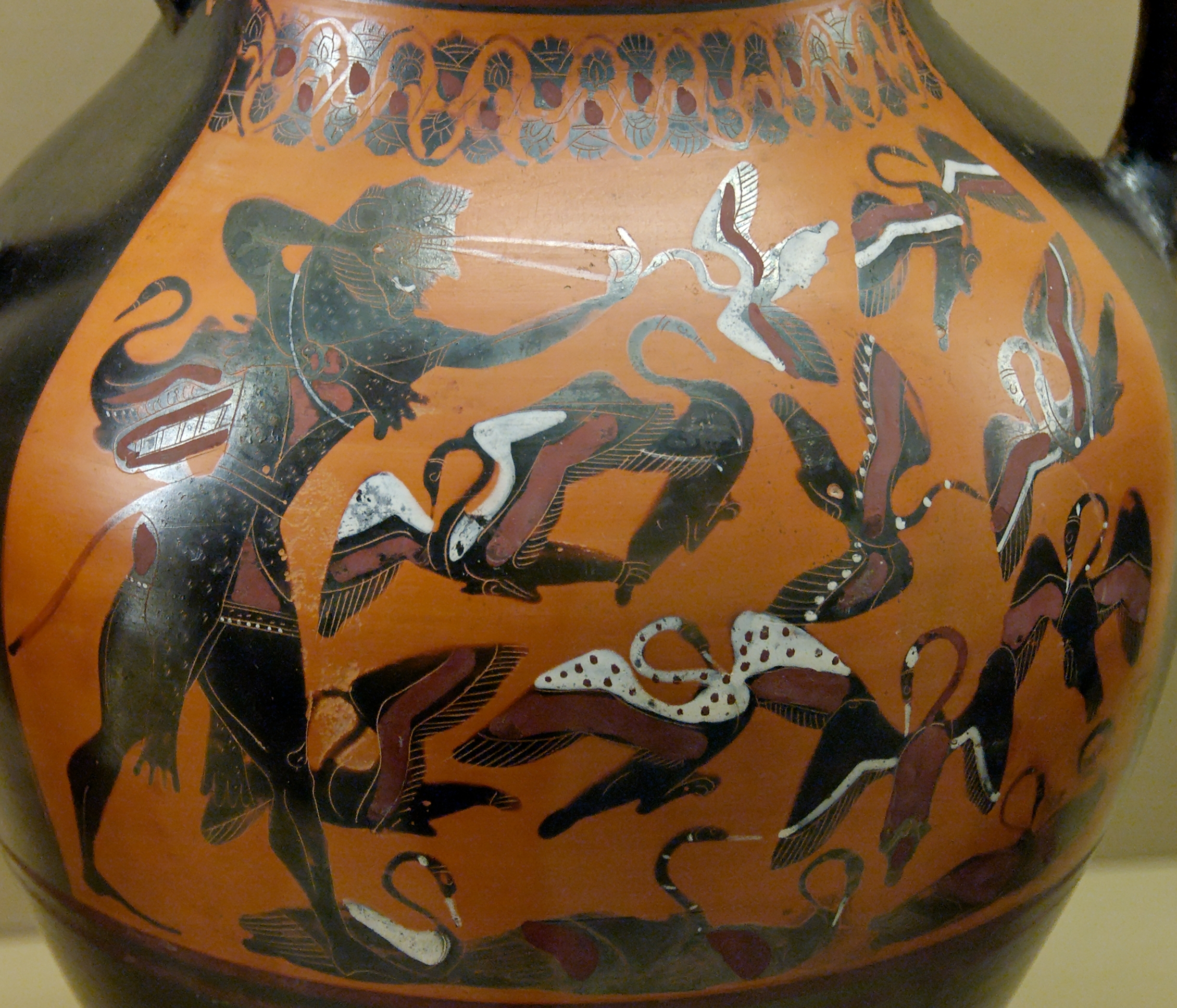
Heracles killing the Stymphalian birds with his sling. Attic black-figured amphora, c. 540 BC. Said to be from Vulci.

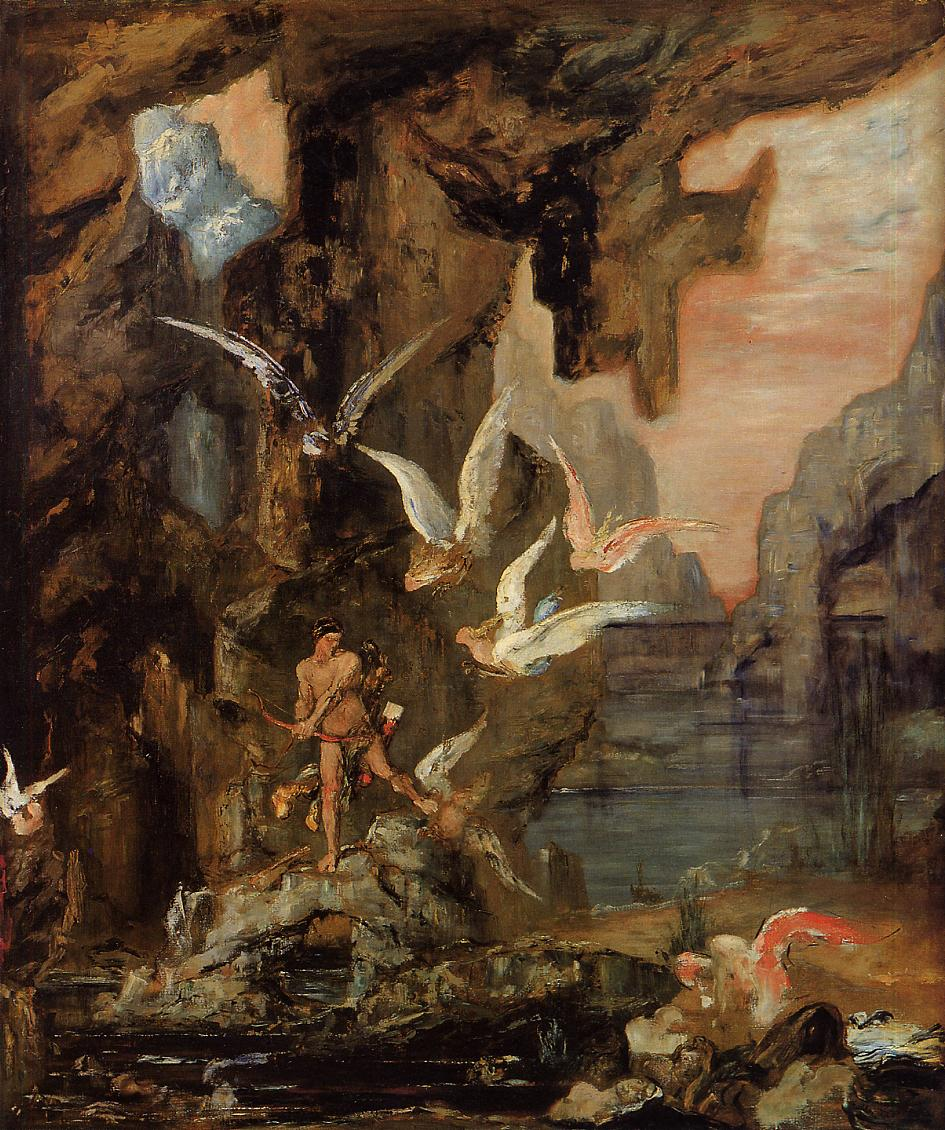
Hercules at Lake Stymphalos by Gustave Moreau

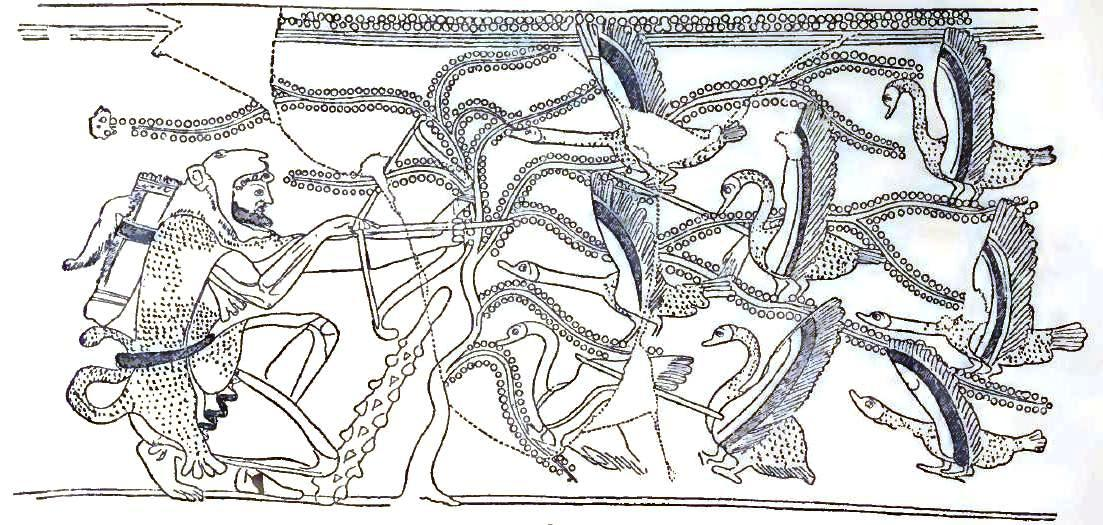
Heracles killing the Stymphalian birds with arrows

== See also ==
- Hercules Killing the Stymphalian Birds
- Stymphalian Birds (Savva)

== General sources ==
- Apollodorus, The Library with an English Translation by Sir James George Frazer, F.B.A., F.R.S. in 2 Volumes, Cambridge, MA, Harvard University Press; London, William Heinemann Ltd. 1921. ISBN 0-674-99135-4. Online version at the Perseus Digital Library. Greek text available from the same website.
- Apollonius Rhodius, Argonautica translated by Robert Cooper Seaton (1853–1915), R. C. Loeb Classical Library Volume 001. London, William Heinemann Ltd, 1912. Online version at the Topos Text Project.
- Apollonius Rhodius, Argonautica. George W. Mooney. London. Longmans, Green. 1912. Greek text available at the Perseus Digital Library.
- Gaius Julius Hyginus, Fabulae from The Myths of Hyginus translated and edited by Mary Grant. University of Kansas Publications in Humanistic Studies. Online version at the Topos Text Project.
- "Greece: I Ancient", in The New Grove's Dictionary of Music and Musicians, London 2001, vol. 10, pp. 344–34
- Maurus Servius Honoratus, In Vergilii carmina comentarii. Servii Grammatici qui feruntur in Vergilii carmina commentarii; recensuerunt Georgius Thilo et Hermannus Hagen. Georgius Thilo. Leipzig. B. G. Teubner. 1881. Online version at the Perseus Digital Library.
- Pausanias, Description of Greece with an English Translation by W.H.S. Jones, Litt.D., and H.A. Ormerod, M.A., in 4 Volumes. Cambridge, MA, Harvard University Press; London, William Heinemann Ltd. 1918. ISBN 0-674-99328-4. Online version at the Perseus Digital Library
- Pausanias, Graeciae Descriptio. 3 vols. Leipzig, Teubner. 1903. Greek text available at the Perseus Digital Library.
- Quintus Smyrnaeus, The Fall of Troy translated by Way. A. S. Loeb Classical Library Volume 19. London: William Heinemann, 1913. Online version at Topos Text Project.
- Quintus Smyrnaeus, The Fall of Troy. Arthur S. Way. London: William Heinemann; New York: G.P. Putnam's Sons. 1913. Greek text available at the Perseus Digital Library.
- Strabo, The Geography of Strabo. Edition by H.L. Jones. Cambridge, Mass.: Harvard University Press; London: William Heinemann, Ltd. 1924. Online version at the Perseus Digital Library.
- Strabo, Geographica edited by A. Meineke. Leipzig: Teubner. 1877. Greek text available at the Perseus Digital Library.
- Tzetzes, John, Histories or Chiliades unedited translation by Ana Untila (Book I), Gary Berkowitz (II-IV), Konstantinos Ramiotis (V-VI), Vasiliki Dogani (VII-VIII), Jonathan Alexander (IX-X), Muhammad Syarif Fadhlurrahman (XI), and Nikolaos Giallousis (XII-XIII), with translation adjustments by Brady Kiesling affecting about 15 percent of the total . These translations are based on the 1826 Greek edition of Theophilus Kiesslingius. Online version at the Topos Text Project.
