= Lake Stymphalia =

Lake in Peloponnese, Greece

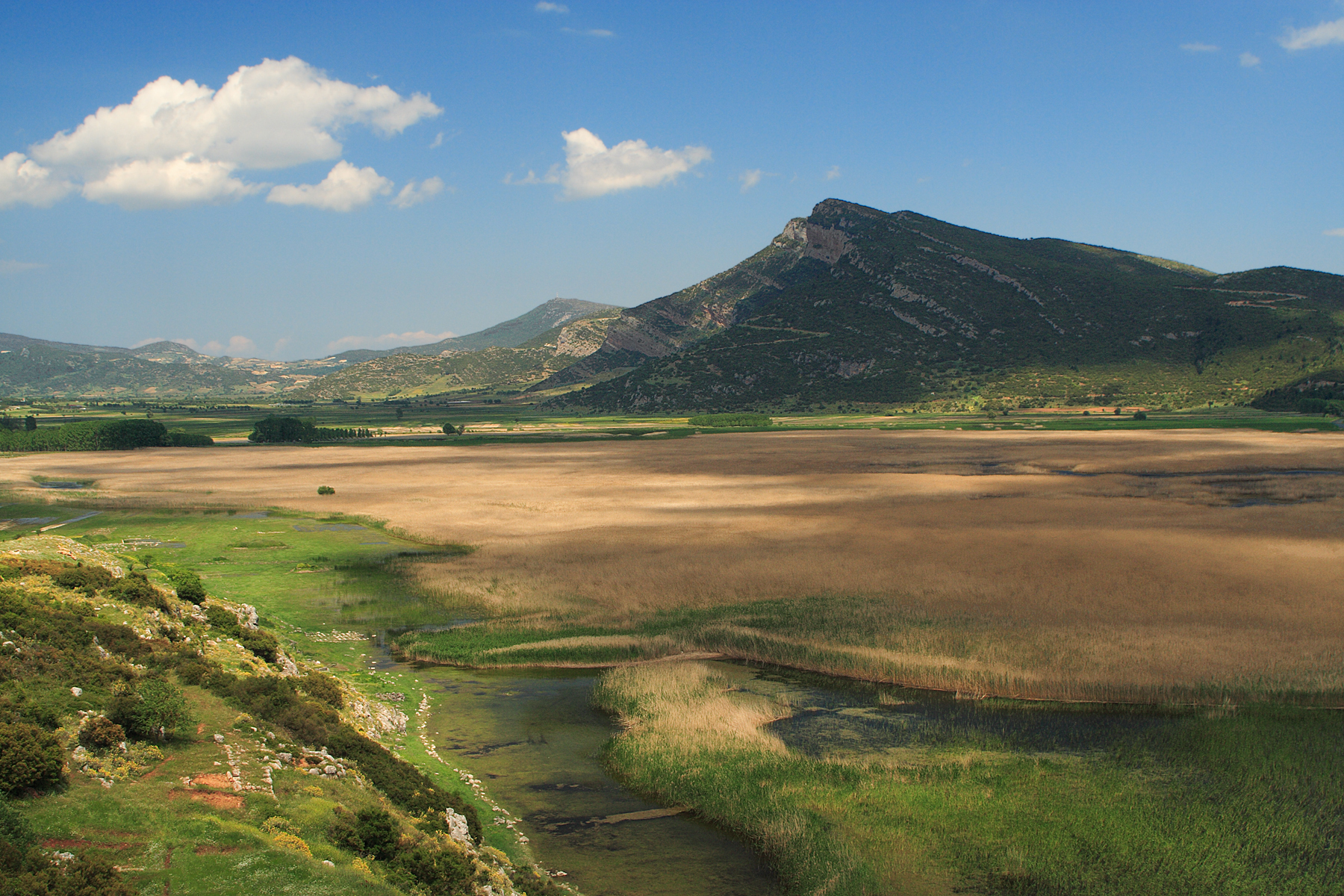
- East view of the Lake

- Location within Greece
- Location: Corinthia
- Coordinates: 37°51′04″N 22°27′40″E
- Basin countries: Greece

Lake Stymphalia (Greek: Λίμνη Στυμφαλία - Límnē Stymphalía) is located in the north-eastern part of the Peloponnese, in Corinthia, southern Greece. It is a closed karst basin with a wetland area and an agrarian area. The lake is an important stopover for migratory birds. The size of the lake varies, depending on the season.

Usually this area around the lake is fairly dry underfoot. In certain weather conditions thousands of small green frogs hide in the damp grass from the aquatic snakes. These frogs are invisible in the grass until you almost step on them, at which point they jump out of the way, usually landing on another frog which also jumps. The effect is of ripples of frogs travelling outwards with every step. The area is rich in birds, amphibians and plant life. Other wildlife, such as weasels, can also be seen.

The area is also mentioned in Greek Mythology, due to the Stymphalian birds, which infested the Arcadian woods near the lake. Heracles' sixth labour was to exterminate them.

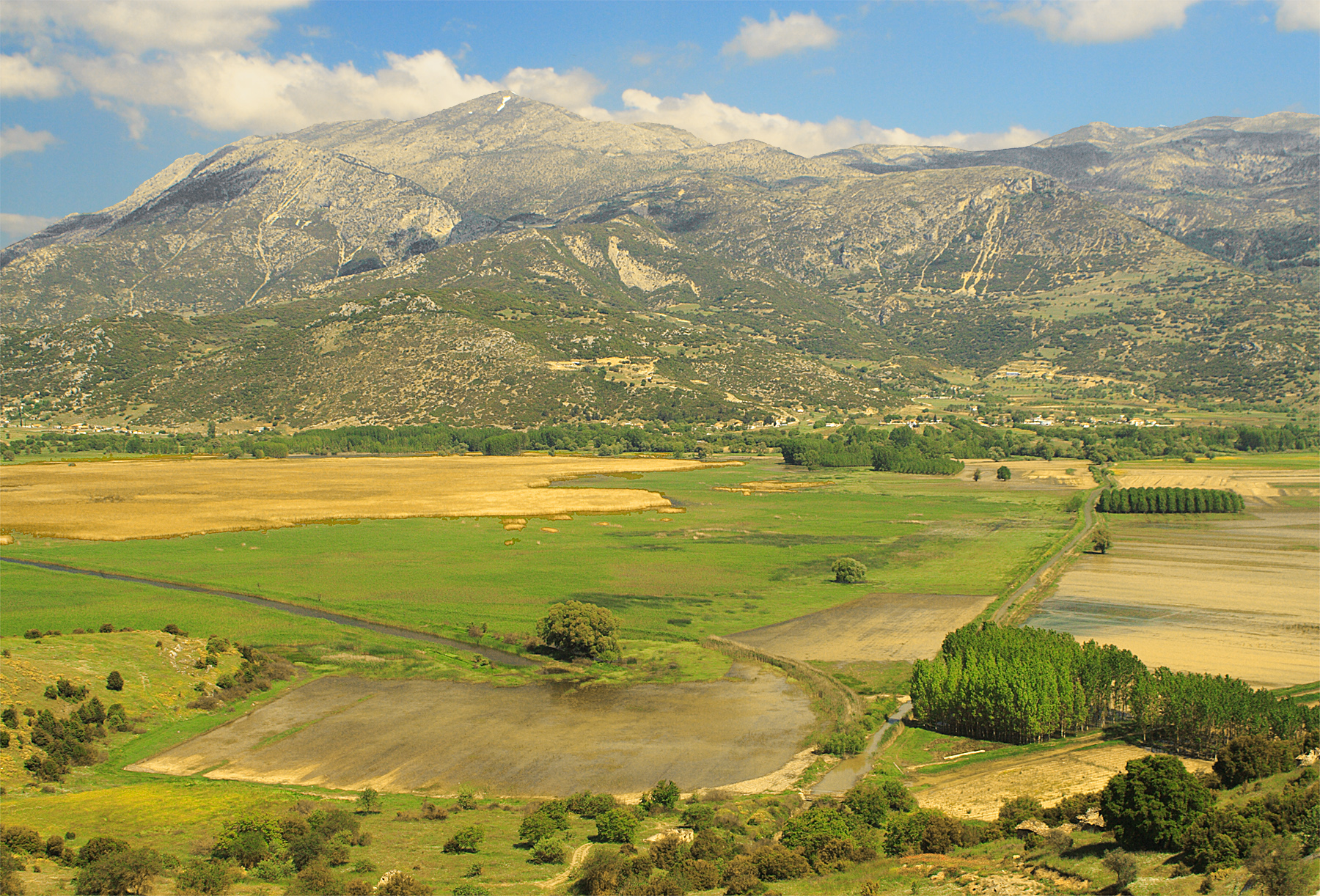
Village Stymfalia, Mount Kyllini, fields wet. Ditch, leading to an irrigation tunnel

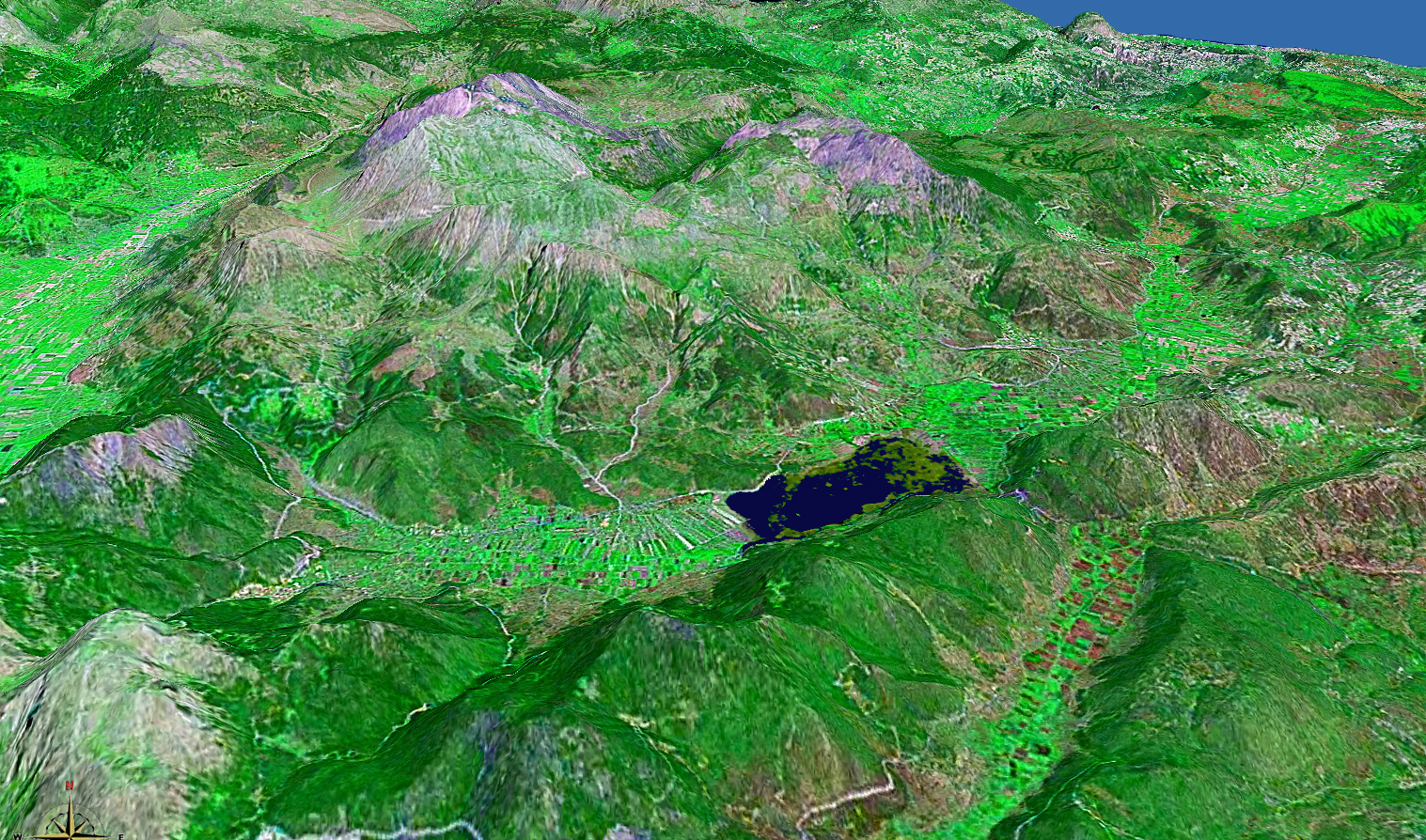
Plain is fertile, lake with high water, Snow on Mount Kyllini (2.374 m), NASA WorldWind (8 km)
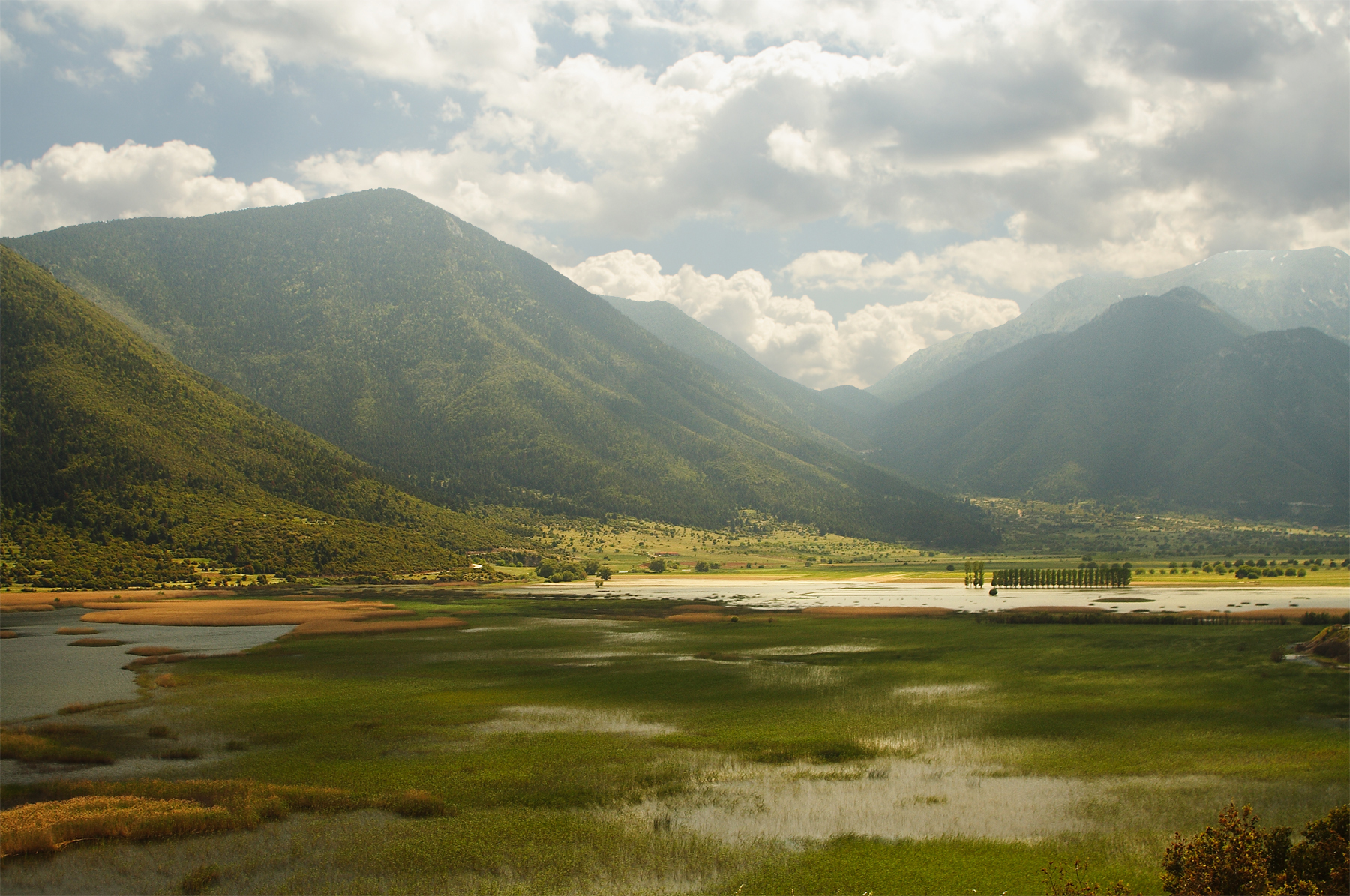
Oligyrtos Mountain, 100% forest, high water, fields wet

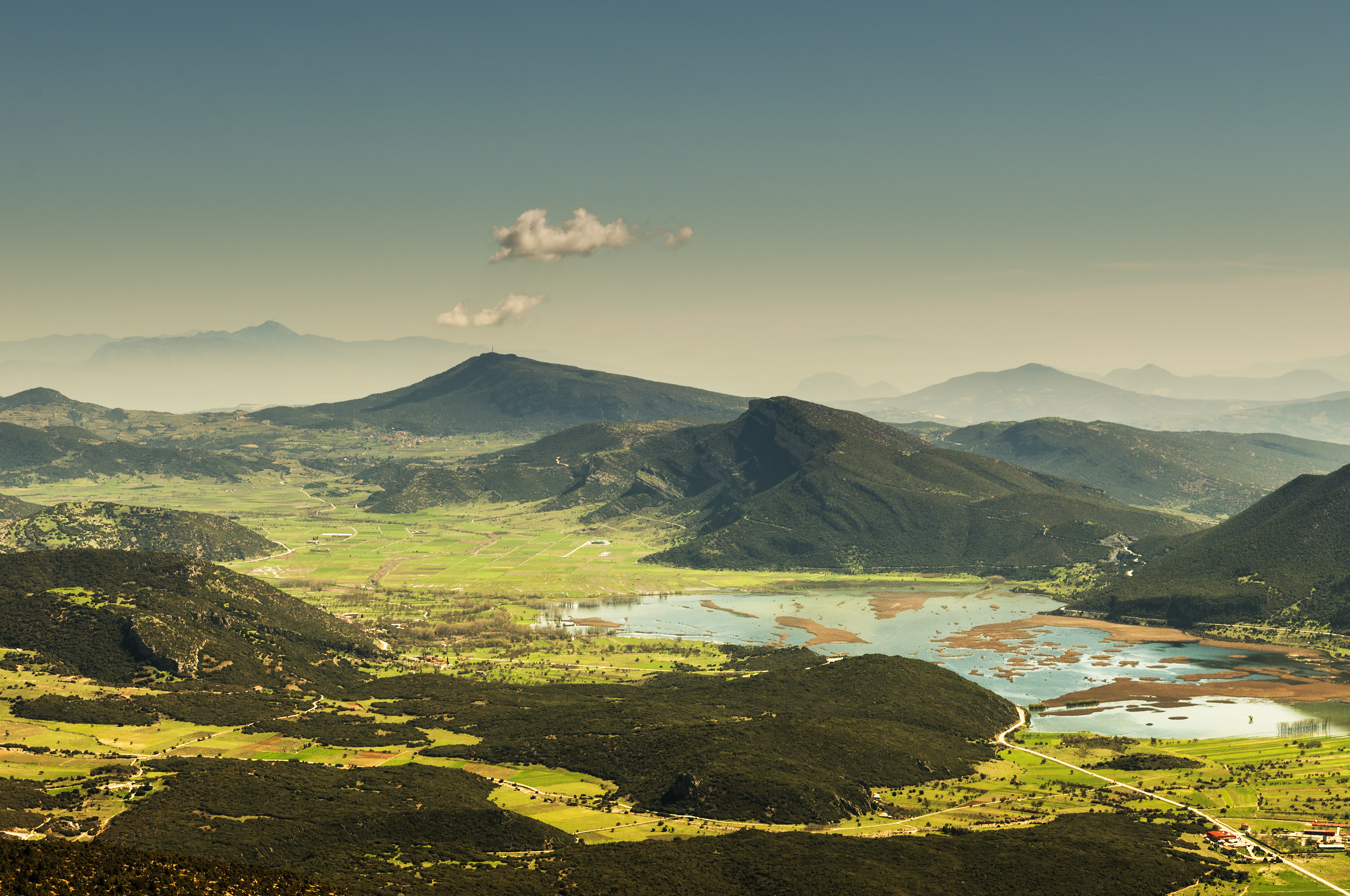
Panorama of closed karst basin

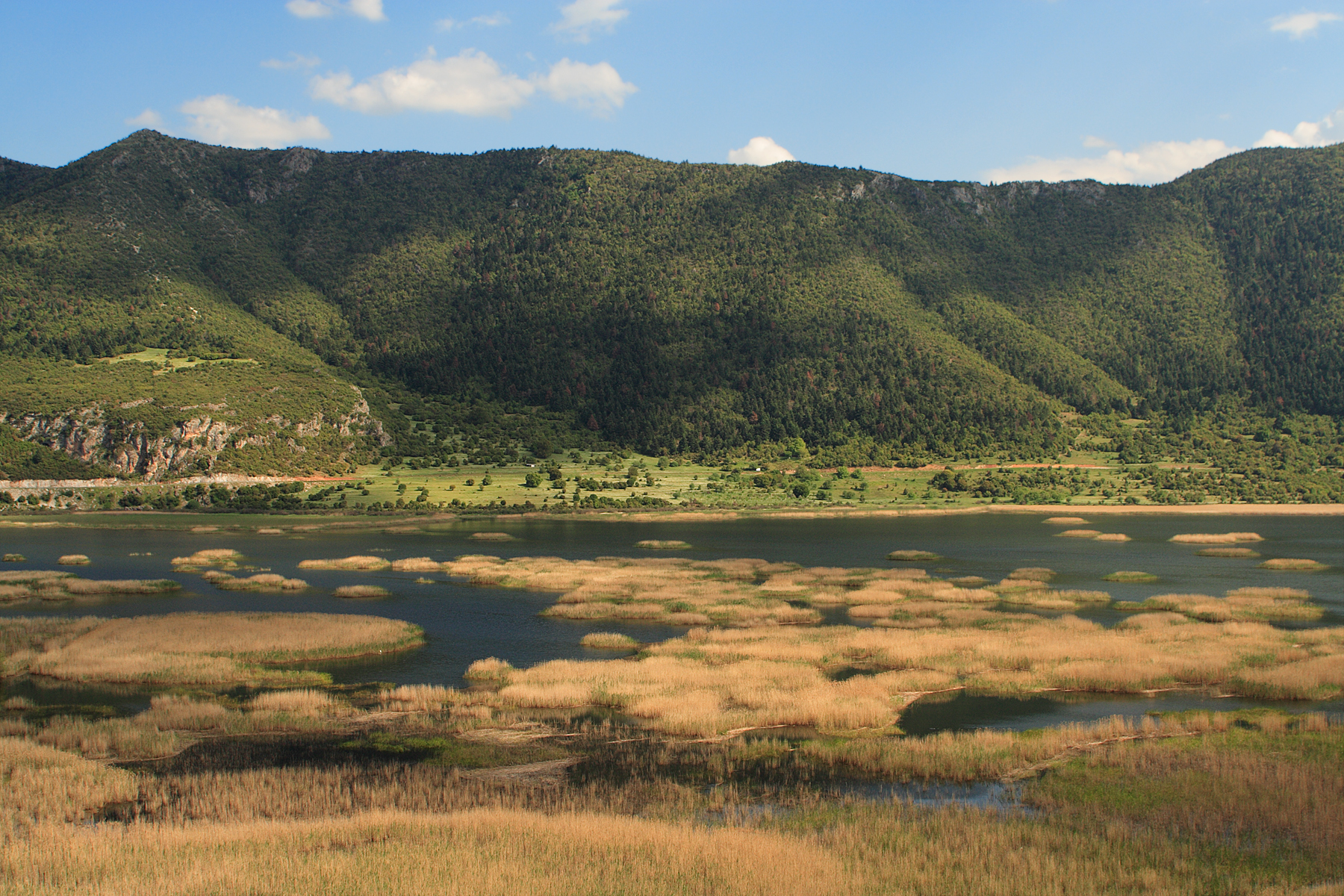
reed growing (green), densely forested

== See also ==
- Stymphalus (Arcadia), ancient town
- Stymfalia, modern town
