= Thoas =

Thoas may refer to several figures in Greek mythology:

- Thoas (king of Lemnos), saved by his daughter Hypsipyle from the massacre by the Lemnian women, a son of Dionysus and Ariadne, sometimes identified with Thoas (king of the Taurians) below
- Thoas (king of the Taurians), king when Iphigenia became priestess of Artimis, sometimes identified with Thoas (king of Lemnos) above
- Thoas (king of Aetolia), a Greek hero and leader in the Trojan War, son of Andraemon and Gorge
- Thoas (king of Corinth), a son of Ornytion and a grandson of Sisyphus
- Thoas (son of Jason), a son of Jason, the leader of the Argonauts, and Hypsipyle the daughter of Thoas, the king of Lemnos (above), and the brother of Euneus
- Thoas (mythology), other figures named "Thoas" in Greek mythology

Thoas may also refer to:

- 4834 Thoas, an asteroid named after the Greek mythological Trojan War hero
- An ancient name of the Achelous River
