= Thoas (mythology) =

Greek mythological figures

In Greek mythology, Thoas (Ancient Greek: Θόας, "fleet, swift") may refer to the following figures:

- Thoas, a king of Lemnos saved by his daughter Hypsipyle from the massacre by the Lemnian women. He was a son of Dionysus and Ariadne, and sometimes identified with Thoas, the king of the Taurians, below.
- Thoas, a king of the Taurians when Iphigenia became priestess of Artemis. He is sometimes identified with Thoas, the king of Lemnos above.
- Thoas, a king of Aetolia. He was the son of Andraemon and Gorge, and a Greek leader and hero in the Trojan War.
- Thoas, a king of Corinth. He was a son of Ornytion and a grandson of Sisyphus.
- Thoas, a son of Jason and Hypsipyle, and a grandson of Thoas, the king of Lemnos (above). He was the twin brother of Euneus.
- Thoas, the Spartan son of Icarius, and the brother of Penelope, the wife of Odysseus. According to the mythographer Apollodorus, Icarius and the Naiad nymph Periboea had five sons: Thoas, Damasippus, Imeusimus, Aletes and Perileos, and a daughter Penelope. According to Strabo, however, the mother by Icarius of "Penelope and her brothers" was Polycaste, the daughter of Lygaeus.
- Thoas (or Thoon?), a Giant who, according to the mythographer Apollodorus, along with the Giant Agrius, was killed by the Moirai (Fates) with bronze clubs, during the Gigantomachy, the battle fought between the Giants and the Olympian gods.
- Thoas, an Athenian, who according to Plutarch, was the brother of Euneus and Solois, and accompanied Theseus on his return from his expedition against the Amazons. This Thoas is different than the Thoas (see above), who was the son of Jason and Hypsipyle, and who also had a brother named Euneus.
- Thoas, a defender of Thebes in the war of the Seven against Thebes. He was killed by Tydeus.
- Thoas, in Homer's Iliad, is a Trojan warrior killed by Menelaus during the Trojan War.
- Thoas, one of the Suitors of Penelope who came from Dulichium along with other 56 wooers. He, with the other suitors, was shot dead by Odysseus with the help of Eumaeus, Philoetius, and Telemachus.
- Thoas, a companion of Aeneas in Italy. He was crushed with a stone, by Halesus an ally of Turnus.
