= Aletes (mythology) =

In Greek mythology, Aletes (Ancient Greek: Ἀλήτης) may refer to the following characters:

- Aletes, son of Aegisthus who was killed by Orestes.
- Aletes, a Trojan counselor depicted in the Aeneid.
- Aletes, son of Hippotes, one of the Heraclidae.
- Aletes, the Spartan son of Icarius and the naiad Periboea. He was the brother of Penelope, Perileos, Thoas, Imeusimus, Damasippus and probably Iphthime. Aletes was also called Auletes (Aύλητήζ) who together with Semus (Imeusimus) were the only named brothers of Penelope mentioned by some sources.
