= Aletes =

Aletes may refer to:

- Aletes, a deified individual during the Punic domination of Cartagena (Spain).

== Greek mythology ==
- Aletes of Mycenae, who was killed by Orestes
- Aletes (Aeneid), a Trojan counselor depicted in the Aeneid
- Aletes (Heraclid), one of the Heracleidae
- Aletes, son of Icarius
- Aletes, another name for Bakis of Arcadia

== Biology ==
- Aletes (plant), a plant genus
- Aletes (gastropod), a marine gastropod genus in the fossil record
- Aletes, a genus of moth and synonym of Pyralis
