= Panayotis Lykourezos =

Panayotis Lykourezos (Greek: Παναγιώτης Λυκουρέζος, 1900–1973) was a Greek Navy officer and shipowner who played an important role during World War II, as leader of the secret resistance organization Codrus (named after the ancient king). He collaborated closely with the British Secret Intelligence Service.

== Life ==
Panayotis Lykourezos was born in Athens in 1900. His father, Constantine Lykourezos, was a prominent Public prosecutor who later entered politics and served as Minister of Justice, while his younger brother, Pausanias Lykourezos, also entered politics, was elected to the Hellenic Parliament and served as interior minister.

He graduated from the Hellenic Naval Academy and became an officer in the Hellenic Navy, from which he eventually resigned in the late 1930s with the rank of Lieutenant Commander (plotarches) in order to enter the shipping business. However, after the start of World War II, he was called back to active service.

After the start of the Nazi occupation, he formed the resistance organization Codrus (named after the ancient king), working closely with the British Secret Intelligence Service. His most important contribution came on 6 October 1943, when he was able to inform MI6 (which in turn informed the British Royal Navy) that a convoy of German ships had departed from the port of Piraeus and was heading to recently liberated island of Leros. Although the Nazis eventually managed to re-conquer Leros, the British on this occasion successfully sank all German ships. Lykourezos was congratulated personally by Admiral Cunningham.

Lykourezos was a royalist, and in 1945, after the end of the war, he published the book "The King in the struggle: 15 historic dates".

After the war, Lykourezos became a successful shipowner. He died in 1973. He was married to Rosa – Lisa Zaimis, daughter of Achaean politician and MP Panayotis Zaimis.
