= Thero (mythology) =

In Greek mythology, the name Thero (Ancient Greek: Θηρώ means "feral, beastly") may refer to:

- Thero, reputed nurse of Ares. According to the inhabitants of Therapne in Sparta, the epithet Theritas (Θηρίτας) of Ares derived from the name of his nurse, Thero. Pausanias remarks that Thero was otherwise unknown to the Greeks and suggests that the tradition may have originated among the Colchians, given the belief that the cult image of Ares Theritas had been brought from Colchis by the Dioscuri.
- Thero, daughter of Phylas and Leipephilene, and sister of Hippotes. She was said to have been beautiful as the moonbeams. Falling in love with Apollo, Thero became the mother of Chaeron, eponym of Chaeronea.
- Thero, a follower of Artemis.

== See also ==
- Thero (disambiguation)
