= Pythopolis =

Pythopolis (Ancient Greek: Πυθόπολις) may refer to:

- Pythopolis (Mysia)
- Pythopolis, alternate name of Antioch on the Maeander
- Pythopolis, alternate name of Nysa on the Maeander
