= Damasippus =

In Greek mythology, Damasippus (Ancient Greek: Δαμάσιππος means ‘horse-taming) is the Spartan son of Icarius and the naiad Periboea. He was the brother of Penelope, Perileos, Thoas, Imeusimus, Aletes and probably Iphthime. This Damasippus might be the same as Damasiclus who was also called the son of Icarius and brother of Penelope.
