= Solois =

Mythological Athenian man

In Greek mythology, Solois (Ancient Greek: Σολόεις, romanized: Solóeis) is an Athenian man who accompanied the hero Theseus during one of his journeys. Solois developed unrequited feelings for the Amazon Antiope, and killed himself when he was rejected by her, giving his name to the river Solois. His story is preserved in the writings of Plutarch, a Greek author of the Roman era.

== Family ==
Solois was an Athenian man, brother to Euneus and Thoas, born to unnamed parents.

== Mythology ==
Solois and his brothers were among the crew of Theseus' ship when he carried the Amazon Antiope to Attica. Solois fell in love with the beautiful Amazon, but only dared to reveal his forbidden passion to a close friend, and employed said friend to disclose his feelings to Antiope. The man did as told, but Antiope rejected Solois' amorous advances in a gracious and gentle manner, and spoke no word of it to Theseus. Nevertheless, her rejection left Solois inconsolable, so he flung himself into a river near the seaside and drowned.

Theseus was very distressed when he was informed of Solois' death and the reasons of his suicide. He then remembered a prophecy he had once received from the oracle of Delphi, that he was to build a city in whichever foreign land he felt the greatest sorrow and affliction. He called the city Pythopolis, after Pythian Apollo, and the river that ran by it 'Solois' after his friend. He left there the deceased man's brothers Euneus and Thoas and entrusted them with the government and laws.

== Background ==
Solois' myth is related by ancient Greek author Plutarch, who attributes it to one Menecrates and his lost work History of Nicaea. Nicaea was an ancient Greek city in the region of Bithynia, northwestern Asia Minor, now known as İznik. Menecrates likely recorded a local Bithynian legend explaining why the city Pythopolis and the river Solois (now known as the Kocadere, flowing near the modern village of Sölöz) were called as such.

Solois and his tale might explain why the port city of Soli or Soloi in Cilicia printed silver coins struck with the image of an Amazon on them, supposing the inhabitants claimed to have been named after Solois, which could have allowed them to associate their town with the powerful city-state of Athens. This connection and hypothesis has been criticised as weak, since neither Antiope nor Solois ever came anywhere close to Soloi, and the Amazon expendition associated with Cilicia was carried out by Myrrhine.

== Legacy ==
The story of Solois and his tragic love appeared in Venetian operas of the seventeenth century like Fedra Incoronata and L'incostante trionfante, overo il Teseo ("Theseus, or the Triumph of the Incostant Lover").

== See also ==
Other deaths by drowning in Greek mythology:

- Phasis
- Calamus
- Alcinoë

== Bibliography ==
- Braund, David (September 1, 2025). "Fifth Century BC Coinage of Cilician Soloi". In Valentina Mordvintseva; Anna Ivanova; Svyatoslav Smirnov (eds.). Greeks and Barbarians Networking on the Shores of the Black Sea and Beyond. BRILL. ISBN 978-90-04-31007-0.
- Grimal, Pierre (1987). The Dictionary of Classical Mythology. Wiley-Blackwell. ISBN 0-631-13209-0.
- Heller, Wendy (2010). "Phaedra's Handmaiden: Tragedy as Comedy and Spectacle in Seventeenth-Century Opera". In Brown, Peter; Ograjenšek, Suzana (eds.). Ancient Drama in Music for the Modern Stage. Oxford - New York: Oxford University Press. ISBN 978-0-19-955855-1.
- Mayor, Adrienne (2014). The Amazons: Lives and Legends of Warrior Women across the Ancient World. US: Princeton University Press. ISBN 978-0-691-14720-8.
- Plutarch, Life of Theseus in Plutarch's Parallel Lives, with an English Translation by Bernadotte Perrin. Cambridge, MA. Harvard University Press. London. William Heinemann Ltd. 1914. 1. Available online at Perseus Digital Library.
