= 1080s BC =

Decade

The 1080s BC was a decade that lasted from 1089 BC to 1080 BC.

== Events and trends ==
- Iron Age continues
- 1089 BC—Melanthus, legendary King of Athens, dies after a reign of 37 years and is succeeded by his son Codrus.
- Early 1080s BC- Herihor, the high-priest of Amon, usurps Ramesses XI's authority, becoming the de facto ruler of Upper Egypt.
- 1082 BC- Babylonia suffers from a severe famine.
- c.1081 BC- Herihor dies.
- Early phase of transition from New Kingdom Period to Third Intermediate Period in Egypt continues.

== Significant people ==
- Tiglath-Pileser I, King of Assyria, r. c.1114–1076 BC
- Melanthus, Legendary King of Athens, r. c.1126–1089 BC.
- Codrus, Legendary King of Athens, r. c.1089–1068 BC
- Marduk-nadin-ahhe, King of Babylon, r. 1100–1082 BC
- Marduk-shapik-zeri, King of Babylon, r. 1082–1069 BC
- Di Yi, Shang dynasty king of China, r. c.1101–1076 BC
- Ramesses XI, Pharaoh of Egypt, r. 1107–1077 BC
- Herihor, High priest of Amon
- Eli, Judge of Ancient Israel
