= Imeusimus =

In Greek mythology, Imeusimus (Ancient Greek: Ἰμεύσιμος) is the son of Icarius and the naiad Periboea. He was the brother of Penelope, Perileos, Thoas, Damasippus, Aletes and possibly Iphthime. Imeusimus was also called Semus (Σῆμος) who together with Auletes (Aletes) were the only named brothers of Penelope mentioned by some sources .
