= Eudoros =

Son of Hermes and Polymele

In Greek mythology, Eudoros (Ancient Greek: Εὔδωρος) was the second of Achilles' five commanders at the Trojan War.

== Family ==
Eudoros was a demigod, the son of Hermes and Polymele, who danced in Artemis' choir. Polymele's father Phylas brought him up after she married Echekles.

== Mythology ==
According to the Iliad, Eudoros commanded ten penteconters and five hundred Myrmidons. In Book XVI of the Iliad, when Patroclus readies Achilles' men, Homer talks about him for fourteen lines – more than any of the other commanders in this passage. He is also the second most notable of the five, beaten only by Phoenix. Eudoros was very fast, and a good fighter.

Eustathius notes that Achilles tasked Eudoros to ensure that Patroclus would not advance too far against the Trojans. However, according to Timolaus of Macedon, Eudoros was the first to die in the ensuing battle, being slain at the hands of Pyraechmes. Therefore, Pyraechmes was the first Trojan to be slain by Patroclus. Patroclus would later overextend and be slain by Hector at the gates of Troy.
