= Phylas =

In Greek mythology, the name Phylas (Ancient Greek: Φύλας, gen. Φύλαντος, lit. 'watcher', 'guard' or 'sentinel') may refer to:

- Phylas, king of Ephyra, a descendant of Dryopes. Heracles led a war against him and killed him. Phylas had two daughters, Meda and Astyoche; Heracles consorted with both and fathered Antiochus with the former, and Tlepolemus with the latter.
- Phylas, son of Antiochus, thus a great-grandson of the precedent. With Leipephilene, daughter of Iolaus and Megara, he became father of Hippotes and Thero.
- Phylas, father of Polymele; he raised Eudoros, his daughter's son by Hermes.
