= Periboea =

Set of mythological Greek characters

In Greek mythology, the name Periboea (/ˌpɛrɪˈbiːə/; Ancient Greek: Περίβοια, romanized: Periboia, lit. 'surrounded by cattle' or 'around cattle') refers to multiple figures:

- Periboea, one of the 3,000 Oceanids, water-nymph daughters of the Titans Oceanus and his sister-wife Tethys. She was the mother of Aura by Lelantos.
- Periboea, daughter of the Giant Eurymedon and the mother of Nausithous with Poseidon.
- Periboea, daughter of either King Cychreus of Salamis or of King Alcathous of Megara, her mother in the latter case being either Pyrgo or Evaechme, daughter of King Megareus of Onchestus. She was ravished by Telamon who then fled away; when her father learned of that, he ordered for her to be cast in the sea, but the guard who was to perform that took pity on her and sold her away; the one who bought her happened to be Telamon. She became by him mother of Ajax. She was among the would-be sacrificial victims of Minotaur; while on board the ship, Minos attempted to sexually abuse her but she was defended by Theseus, with whom she later consorted. Also known as Eriboea.
- Periboea, an alternate name for Merope, the wife of King Polybus of Corinth and mother of Alcinoë. She was the foster mother of Oedipus, future king of Thebes.
- Periboea, a Naiad, wife of Icarius, mother of Penelope, Perilaus, Aletes, Damasippus, Imeusimus and Thoas, presumably also of Iphthime. Icarius' wife is alternatively known as Asterodia, Dorodoche or Polycaste
- Periboea, the Olenian daughter of Hipponous and mother of Tydeus and possibly Melanippus or Olenias by Oeneus. She was sent by his father to Oeneus because she was seduced by Hippostratus, son of Amarynceus.
- Periboea, one of the first two maidens sent by the people of Locris to the shrine of Athena at Troy, in order to relieve them of plague. The other was named Cleopatra.
- Periboea, eldest daughter of Acessamenus, and mother of Pelagon by the river-god Axius.
- Periboea, mother, by Meges, of the Trojans Celtus and Eubius (Εὔβιος).
- Periboea, daughter of Aeolus, the wind lord, and Telepora or Telepatra.

== See also ==
- Naming citation for Jovian asteroid 12929 Periboea
