= Phocus (son of Ornytion) =

In Greek mythology, Phocus (/ˈfoʊkəs/; Ancient Greek: Φῶκος means "seal") was a Corinthian prince who later became the eponymous ruler of Phocis.

== Family ==
Phocus was the son of King Ornytion (or Ornytus) and grandson of Sisyphus; some called him son of Poseidon. Thus, he might be the same as the son of Poseidon and Pronoe who was referred to in the scholia on Iliad.

== Mythology ==
Leaving the kingdom of Corinth to his brother Thoas, Phocus led a colony to the region of Tithorea and Mount Parnassus; the land came to be named Phocis after him.

Phocus was said to have cured the wandering Antiope of her madness, which she had been struck with by Dionysus who was outraged by Dirce's death, and to have married her; they were buried in one and the same grave.
