= Nebrophonus =

In Greek mythology, Nebrophonus (Ancient Greek: Νεβροφόνος, romanized: Nebrophónos, lit. 'fawn-killer') may refer to a person and a canine:

- Nebrophonus, son of Jason and Hypsipyle, daughter of King Thoas of Lemnos. He was the twin brother of Euneus. In some accounts, he was called Thoas or Deipylus.
- Nebrophonus, one of Actaeon's dogs who attacked their master after he was being transformed into a stag by Artemis.
