= Deipylus =

In Greek mythology, Deipylus may refer to three distinct characters:

- Deipylus, son of Jason and Hypsipyle, daughter of King Thoas of Lemnos. He was the twin brother of Euneus. In some accounts, he was called Thoas or Nebrophonus.
- Deipylus, a Thracian prince as the son of King Polymestor of the Bistonians and Iliona, eldest daughter of King Priam of Troy. He was brought up by his mother as her own brother together with Polydorus, youngest son of Priam and brother of Iliona. The latter reared his brother as her own son so that if anything happened to either of them, she could give the other to her parents. Later on, Deipylus was killed by his own father Polymestor, who was bribed by the Achaeans, thinking that he was Polydorus
- Deipylus, a Achaean warrior during the Trojan War and a companion of Sthenelus. Sthenelus tasked Deipylus with taking the horses of Aeneas, whom Diomedes had wounded and driven off, back to the camp of the Achaeans.
