= Leipephilene =

Daughter of Iolaus and Megara in Greek mythology

In Greek mythology, Leipephilene (Ancient Greek: Λειπεφιλήνη, romanized: Leipephilḗnē) was the daughter of Iolaus and Megara. She was renowned for her beauty which was compared to that of an Olympian goddess. Leipephilene married Phylas and bore two children to him, Hippotes and Thero.

== Name ==
The name form "Leipephilene" is a corruption, and has been variously emended by some editors as "Leipephile" (Ancient Greek: Λειπεφίλη, romanized: Leipephílē), "Hippophile" (Ancient Greek: Ἱπποφίλη, romanized: Hippophílē, lit. 'horse-loving') or "Deiphile" (Ancient Greek: Δηιφίλη, romanized: Dēiphílē). The precise original form remains unknown.
