= Thoas (king of Lemnos) =

Greek mythological figure

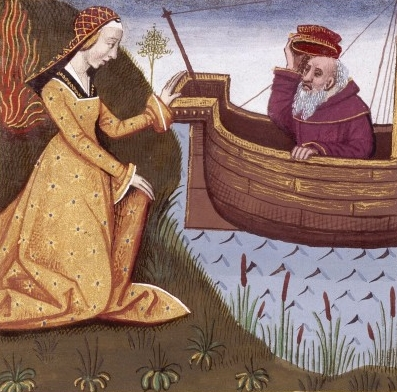
Hypsipyle saves Thoas

In Greek mythology, Thoas (Ancient Greek: Θόας, "fleet, swift") was a son of the god Dionysus and Ariadne, the daughter of the Cretan king Minos. He was the king of Lemnos when the Lemnian women decided to kill all the men on the island. He was the only man to survive the massacre, having been saved by his daughter Hypsipyle. He is sometimes identified with the Thoas who was the king of the Taurians when Iphigenia was taken to the land of the Taurians and became a priestess of Artemis there.

== Family ==
Thoas was the son of Dionysus and Ariadne. According to the mythographer Apollodorus, after the god Dionysus fell in love with Ariadne he carried her to Lemnos where they produced four sons Thoas, Staphylus, Oenopion, and Peparethus. However, according to Plutarch, by some accounts Oenopion and Staphylus were instead the sons of Theseus and Ariadne.

Thoas was the father of Hypsipyle, and according to the Iliad, by her and Jason, the grandfather of Euneus. Other sources say that Hypsipyle and Jason had, in addition to Euneus, a second son, variously given as Thoas, Nebrophonus, or Deipylus, After escaping Lemnos Thoas had a son Sicinus, by the water nymph Oenoe, after whom the Greek island of Sikinos was said to have been named. According to some, Thoas had a wife Myrina, who was the daughter of Cretheus.

== Mythology ==
=== King of Lemnos ===
Thoas was a king of Lemnos. According to the 1st-century BC historian Diodorus Siculus, Thoas had been a general of the wise Cretan king Rhadamanthus (the brother of Minos and Ariadne's uncle) who gave to Thoas the island of Lemnos.

=== The women of Lemnos ===
The first adventure (usually) of Jason and the Argonauts is their visit to the island of Lemnos, where the women have killed all the men except Thoas. There are hints of the story in the Iliad (c. 8th century), where Lemnos is referred to as the "city of godlike Thoas", and Euneus, Jason's son by Thoas' daughter Hypsipyle, is mentioned. The story was probably dealt with in Aeschylus' lost tragedies Hypsipyle and Lemniai (late 6th century-early 5th century BC). The lyric poet Pindar (late 6th century-early 5th century BC) mentions "the race of the Lemnian women, who killed their husbands." There was also a reference to the story in Euripides' lost play Hypsipyle (c. 410 BC), where Hypsipyle tells Euneus: "Alas, the flight that I fled, my son—if you only knew it—from sea-girt Lemnos, because I did not cut off my father’s grey head!". Already, for the mid-5th-century BC historian Herodotus, the story of the women killing their husbands "who were Thoas' companions" had given rise to the proverbial phrase "Lemnian crime" used to mean any cruel deed.

The earliest extant telling of the story, however, occurs in the 3rd-century BC Argonautica by Apollonius of Rhodes. According to this account, all the men on the island had been killed by the women, except for the "aged" Thoas, who was saved by his daughter Hypsipyle. She put Thoas into a "hollow chest" and set him adrift on the open sea. Fishermen pulled him ashore on the island of Sicinus. The island was then called Oenoe and, a water nymph of the same name lived there. Thoas had a son Sicinus, by Oenoe, and the island later took the son's name.

The 1st-century AD Latin poet Valerius Flaccus, in his Argonautica gives a more detailed account of Thoas' rescue and escape. During the night of the massacre, Hypsipyle woke Thoas, covered his head, and took him to Dionysus' temple, where she hid him. The next morning, Hypsipyle disguised Thoas as the temples' cult statue of Dionysus, placed him on the ritual chariot (used to parade the statue). She then took Thoas, through the streets of the city, crying aloud that the god's statue had been polluted by the night's bloody murders, and needed to be cleansed in the sea. By this subterfuge, and with the god Dionysus' help, Thoas was safely hid outside the city. But fearing discovery, Hypsipyle finds an old abandoned boat, in which Thoas put to sea, eventually reaching the land of the Taurians, where "Diana put a sword in his hand, and didst appoint him warden of thy cheerless altar".

Other accounts tell similar stories, with variations. According to the 1st-century AD Latin poet Statius, Hypsipyle hid Thoas on a ship, while according to the late 1st-century BC Latin mythographer Hyginus, who identifies Thoas with the Thoas who was the Taurian king, Hypsipyle put Thoas onto a ship which a storm carried to the "island Taurica".

However, the 1st or 2nd-century AD Greek mythographer Apollodorus gives a different ending to the story. He says that, while Thoas was saved at first, by Hypsipyle hiding him, sometime later, when the Lemnian women discovered that Thoas had escaped the initial slaughter, they killed Thoas, and sold Hypsipyle into slavery.

=== In the Iliad ===
In the Iliad, Achilles offers as prize a silver mixing bowl, which had belonged to Thoas. He had received it from the Phoenicians, and it ended up in the possession of Thoas' grandson Euneus, who gave it to Patroclus as ransom for Lycaon, a son of Priam.
