= Lycaon (son of Priam) =

Mythological Trojan prince

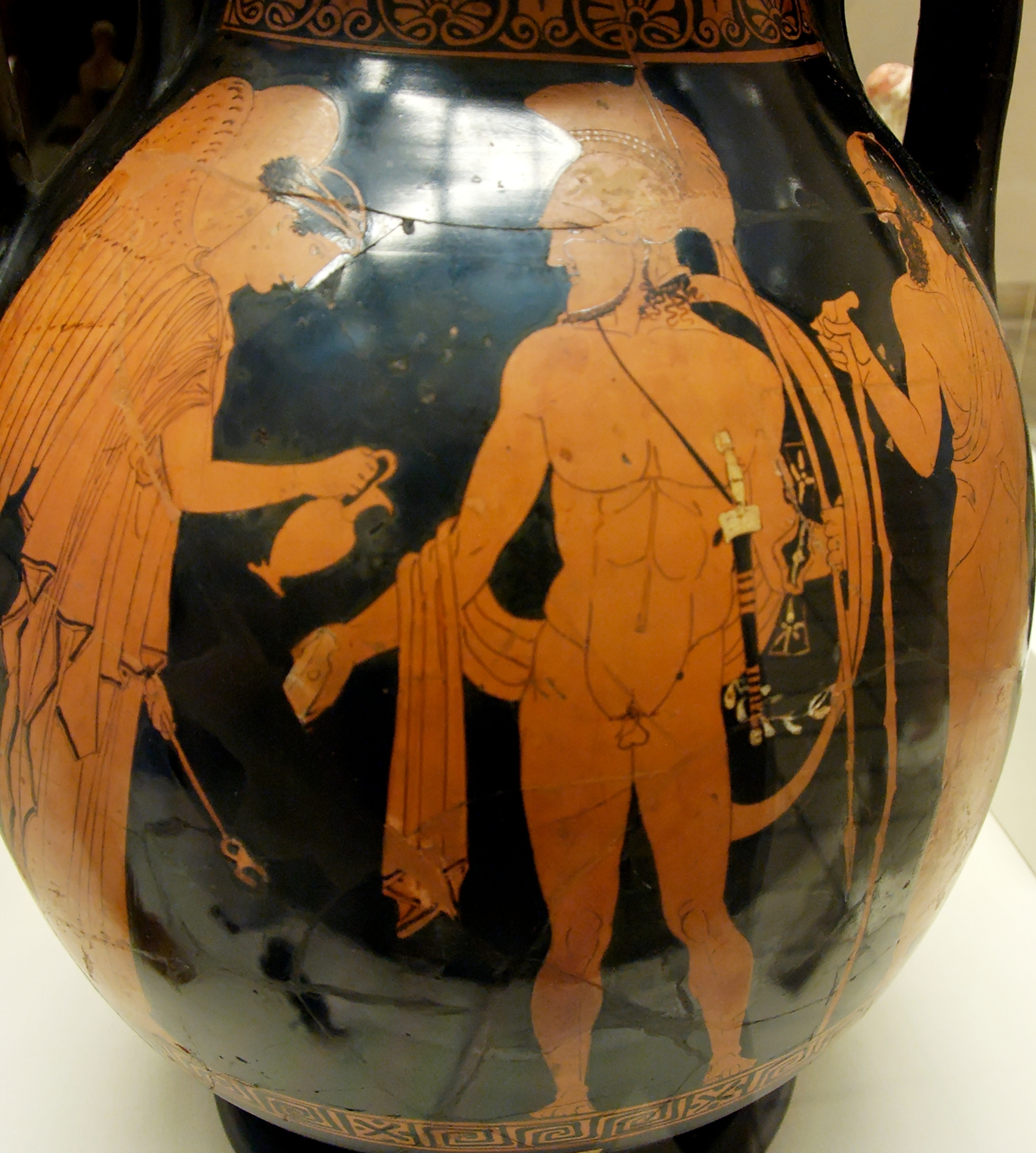
Illustration of Lycaon on an amphora in preparation for battle

In Greek mythology, as recorded in Homer's Iliad, Lycaon (/laɪˈkeɪən/; Ancient Greek: Λυκάων; gen.: Λυκάονος) was a son of Priam and Laothoe, daughter of the Lelegian king Altes.

== Mythology ==
Lycaon was the half-brother of Hector.

Lycaon lent his cuirass to his brother Paris when he duelled against Menelaus, husband of Helen. On another occasion, Apollo took the shape of Lycaon to address Aeneas.

During the Trojan War, Lycaon was captured by Achilles while cutting branches in Priam's orchard. Achilles sold him as a slave to Euneus of Lemnos, but Eetion, ruler of Imbros, bought him, took him back to Troy, and restored him to his father.

Only twelve days later, he faced Achilles in battle, during Achilles' terrible wrath after the death of Patroclus. Lycaon grasped Achilles' knees and begged for mercy, either in exchange for a ransom or in memory of Patroclus' gentle nature; however, neither argument swayed Achilles, who slew him without pity.

== Namesake ==
- 4792 Lykaon, Jovian asteroid named after Lycaon

== See also ==
- List of children of Priam
