= Thoas (king of Corinth) =

In Greek mythology, Thoas (Ancient Greek: Θόας, "fleet, swift") was a prince of Corinth who succeeded his father Ornytion to the throne.

== Family ==
Thoas and his brother Phocus, the eponymous founder of Phocis, were the sons of King Ornytion, who was the son of Sisyphus. According to Corinthian tradition, Thoas and his descendants continued to rule Corinth until the coming of the Heraclids.

== Mythology ==
According to the geographer Pausanias, Thoas remained in Corinth, succeeding his father as its ruler, while his brother Phocus led a colony to Tithorea. Thoas was the father of Damophon, Damophon of Propodas, and Propodas of Doridas and Hyanthidas. During the reign of the latter two, Corinth was seized by the Dorians under the command of Aletes, son of Hippotes. The brothers handed control of Corinth to him and were allowed to remain in the city, while the rest of the people were expelled.
