= Codrus =

Last of the Athenian Semi-Mythical Kings (r. 1089–1068 BC)

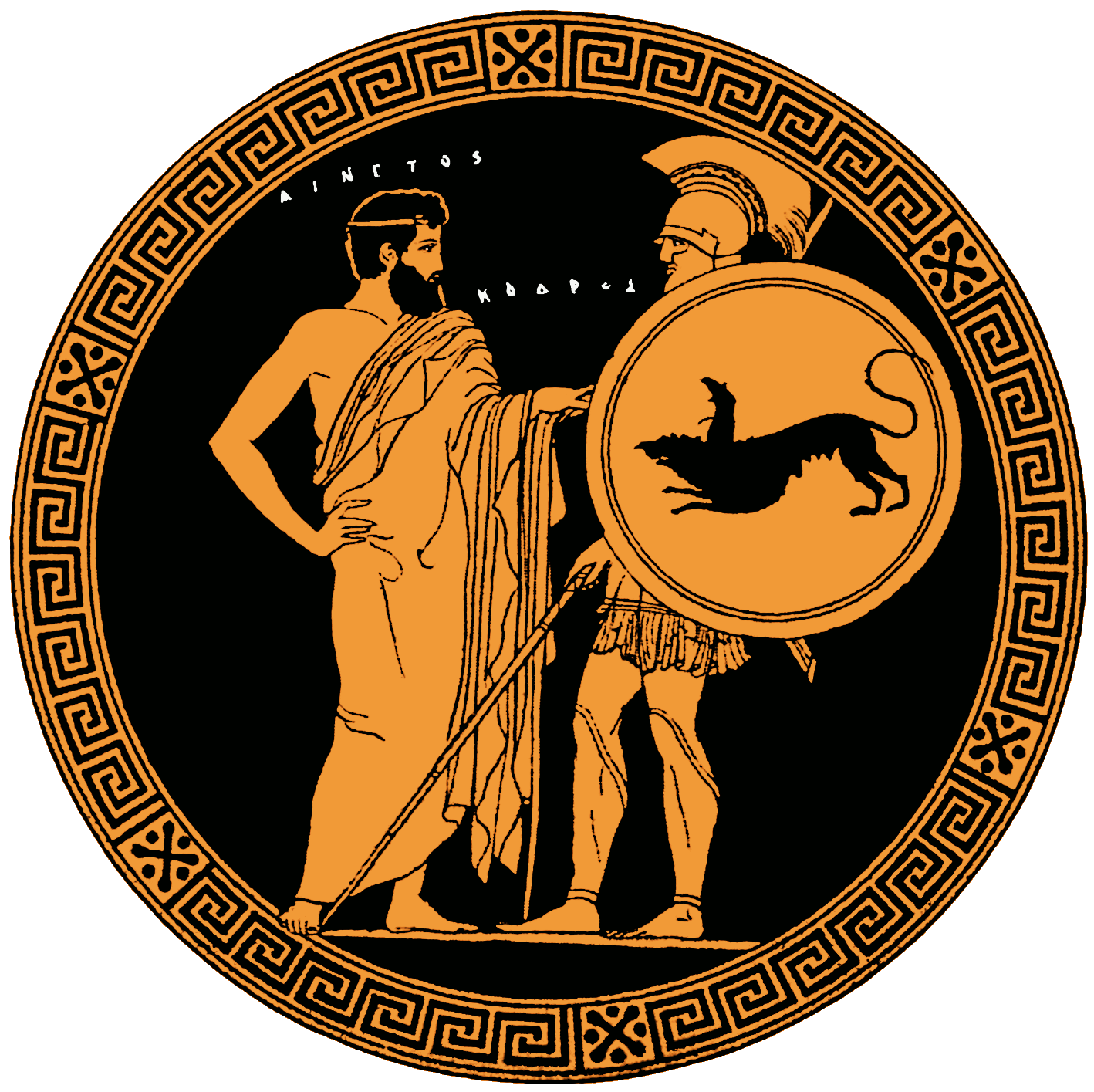
- Codrus on a Attic red-figure cup of Bologna
- Title: King of Athens
- Children: Medon; Acastus

Codrus (/ˈkɒdrəs/; or /ˈkoʊdrəs/; Greek: Κόδρος, Kódros) was the last of the semi-mythical Kings of Athens (r. ca 1089–1068 BC). He was an ancient exemplar of patriotism and self-sacrifice. He was succeeded by his son Medon, who it is claimed ruled not as king but as the first Archon of Athens. He was said to have traced his descent to the sea-God Poseidon through his father Melanthus.

== Legend ==
The earliest version of the story of Codrus comes from the 4th oration Against Leocrates by Lycurgus of Athens. During the time of the Dorian Invasion of Peloponnesus (c. 1068 BC), the Dorians under Aletes, son of Hippotes, had consulted the Delphic Oracle, who prophesied that their invasion would succeed as long as the king was not harmed. The news of this prophecy, that only the death of an Athenian king would ensure the safety of Athens, quickly found its way to the ears of the king. Knowing Athens would fall to the foreign war tribe otherwise, after conquering most of Greece up to this point; for the love of his people, King Codrus sacrificed himself to save them.

Disguised as a peasant, he made it to the vicinity of the Dorian encampment across the river, where he provoked a group of Dorian soldiers. He was put to death in the quarrel, and the Dorians, realizing Codrus had been slain, decided to retreat in fear of their prophesied defeat. In the aftermath of these events, it was claimed that no one thought himself worthy to succeed Codrus and so the title of king was abolished, and that of archon substituted for it.

Aristotle (or possibly one of his students), in the Constitution of the Athenians, states that it was indeed the house of Codrus that abolished the title of king in favor of Archon, eventually followed by 11 more.

Regnal titles
Preceded by Melanthus	King of Athens 21 years	Title abolished
