= Acessamenus =

Greek mythological king of Pieria

In Greek mythology, Acessamenus (Ancient Greek: Ἀκεσσάμενος, romanized: Akessamenos, lit. 'one who has healed' or 'remedied') was a king of Pieria. He was known as the founder and eponym of Akesamenai, a city in Macedonia. In the Iliad, Acessamenus is mentioned as having several daughters, the eldest of whom, Periboea, had a son Pelagon by the river god Axius.
