= Ornytion =

In Greek mythology, Ornytion (Ancient Greek: Ὀρνύτιων, lit. 'moon-bird'') or Ornytus (Ὄρνυτος) may refer to two different characters:

- Ornytion, also known as Porphyrion, a Corinthian prince who later succeeded his father, King Sisyphus, as the ruler of the Ephyraean land. His mother was the Pleiad Merope, daughter of the Titan Atlas. Ornytion was the brother of Glaucus, Thersandrus and Almus, and the father of Phocus and Thoas. A scholiast on Euripides related of him that he came from Aonia to join the people of Hyampolis in the battle against the Opuntian Locrians over Daphnus and won himself the kingdom, which he handed over to Phocus and returned to Corinth with his other son, Thoas, who later succeeded him.
- Ornytion, son of Phocus and thus grandson of the former above Ornytion. He was the father of Naubolus.
