= Euneus =

In Greek mythology, Euneus (Ancient Greek: Εὔνηος) was a son of Jason and Queen Hypsipyle of Lemnos; he had a twin brother whose name is variously given as Nebrophonus, Thoas or Deipylus.

== Mythology ==
The children were separated from their mother after she was exiled from the island for having spared her own father Thoas. Later, the brothers participated in the funeral games of Opheltes (Archemorus), for whose death Hypsipyle was responsible.

Euneus later became King of Lemnos. According to Homer, the Greek fleet on its way to Troy, in the generation after the Argo quest, was reprovisioned and victualled at Euneus' orders. He ransomed Lycaon, a Trojan prisoner, from Patroclus for a silver urn which had been once offered as a gift to his grandfather Thoas, the king of Lemnos, by the Phoenicians.

In a rare account, Euneus and Philoctetes are mentioned as fighting the Carians (allies of the Trojans) and driving them out of the smaller Lemnian isles. As a reward for his aid, Euneus gave a portion of Lemnos to Philoctetes, which he named Akesa.

The Euneidae, a Lemnian clan of cithara-players, regarded Euneus as their ancestor.

== See also ==
- 7152 Euneus, Jovian asteroid
