= Pythopolis (Mysia) =

Historical town

Coordinates: 40°23′46″N 29°24′49″E

Pythopolis (Ancient Greek: Πυθόπολις) was a town of ancient Mysia or of ancient Bithynia. It was a colony of Athens.

According to the legendary tradition, Theseus founded Pythopolis after the death of Solois, one of his companions during an expedition to the Amazons. Stricken with grief, Theseus recalled an oracle from Delphi which had instructed him that, whenever he experienced profound sorrow in a foreign land, he should establish a city there and leave some of his followers behind to rule it. In obedience to this prophecy, he founded the city and named it Pythopolis, meaning "city of the Pythian god", referring to Apollo of Delphi. He then entrusted the settlement to Solois's brothers and to the Athenian nobleman Hermus, who remained there as its leaders and lawgivers.

According to the tradition preserved by Plutarch, the inhabitants of Pythopolis later named a place in the city the "House of Hermes". Plutarch, however, claims that this was a corruption of the original name, arguing that the site had actually been dedicated to Hermus. By accidentally altering the second syllable of the name over time, the honour was unintentionally transferred from Hermus to the god Hermes.

Pythopolis was a member of the Delian League, appearing in a tribute decree of Athens of 422/1 BCE.

Its site is located near modern M Sölöz, Turkey.
