= Axius (mythology) =

River-god in Greek mythology

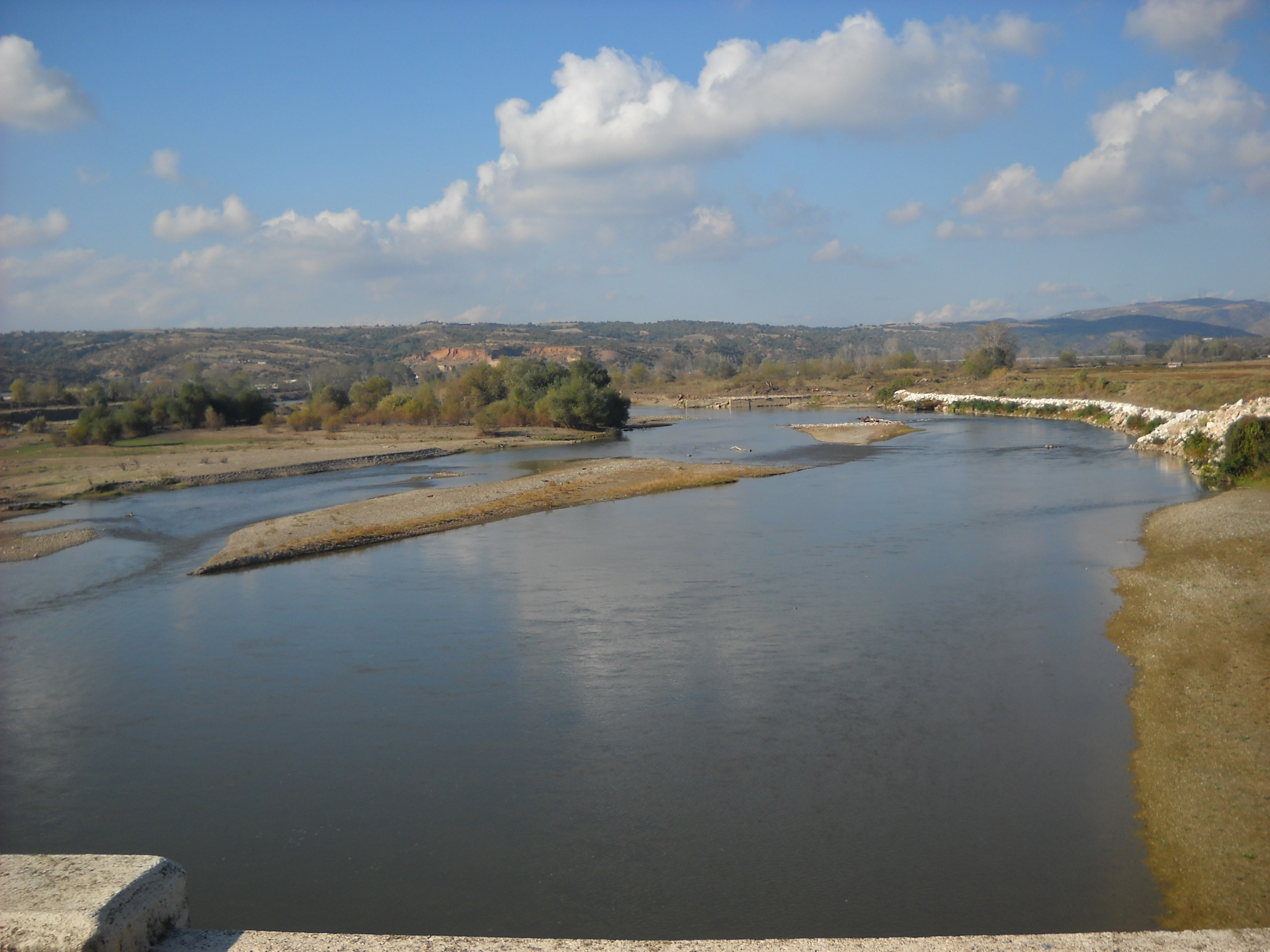
Axios river from Ajioupolis' bridge

In Greek mythology Axius (Ancient Greek: Ἀξιός, romanized: Axios, lit. 'worthy', 'deserving' or 'of value') is a Paeonian river god, the son of Oceanus and Tethys. He was the father of Pelagon, by Periboea, daughter of Acessamenus. His domain was the river Axius, now known as the Vardar, flowing in the ancient region of Macedonia.

The river god was an ancestor of Euphemus and his son, Eurybarus, the hero who slew the drakaina Sybaris.
