= Aletes (Aeneid) =

Aletes (Ancient Greek: Ἀλήτης) is an old and wise Trojan counselor depicted in the Aeneid. He commends Nisus and Euryalus for their courage. They intend to enter the Rutulians' camp by night, slaughter men, take plunder, make their way on to Pallanteum, where Aeneas has been waylaid, and bring him the news that the Rutulians have attacked the Trojan camp. Weeping, he affirms that the gods must favor the Trojans and that the gods, Aeneas, and Ascanius will all reward these daring young men.
