= Hippotes =

Greek mythological characters

Hippotes (Ancient Greek: Ἱππότης, romanized: Hippotēs, lit. 'horseman', 'knight' or 'one who rides a horse') may refer to a number of people from Greek mythology:

- Hippotes, son of Mimas and father of Aeolus, the keeper of the Winds in the Odyssey. He was a mortal king.
- Hippotes, a Corinthian prince as the son of King Creon, who accused Medea of the murder she had committed on his sister and his father. His persona was assumed by Medeus, son of Jason or Aegeus and Medea, when he came to the court of King Perses of Colchis.
- Hippotes, a son of Phylas by Leipephilene, daughter of Iolaus, and great-grandnephew and great-grandson of Heracles. When the Heraclidae, on their invading the Peloponnesus, were encamped near Naupactus, Hippotes killed the seer Carnus, in consequence of which the army of the Heracleidae began to suffer very severely, and Hippotes by the command of an oracle was banished for a period of ten years. He was likely the same Hippotes who was the father of Aletes. He seems to be the same as the Hippotes who was regarded as the founder of Cnidus in Caria.
