= Aletes (Heraclid) =

Ancient Greek mythological figure

Aletes (Ancient Greek: Ἀλήτης) was a son of Hippotes, of Dorian ancestry, and a fifth-generation descendant of Heracles. He is said to have defeated in battle the Corinthians, taken possession of Corinth, and to have expelled the Sisyphids thirty years after the first invasion of the Peloponnesus by the Heraclids. His family, sometimes called the Aletidae, maintained themselves at Corinth down to the time of Bacchis (that is, late 10th century BC). Velleius Paterculus calls him a descendant of Heracles, but of the sixth generation. He received an oracle, promising him the sovereignty of Athens if during the war, which was then going on, its king should remain uninjured. This oracle became known at Athens, and the Athenian king Codrus sacrificed himself to preserve the city.
